= BYD Auto =

Chinese automobile manufacturer

BYD Auto Co., Ltd.
- BYD car brand logo used since 2022

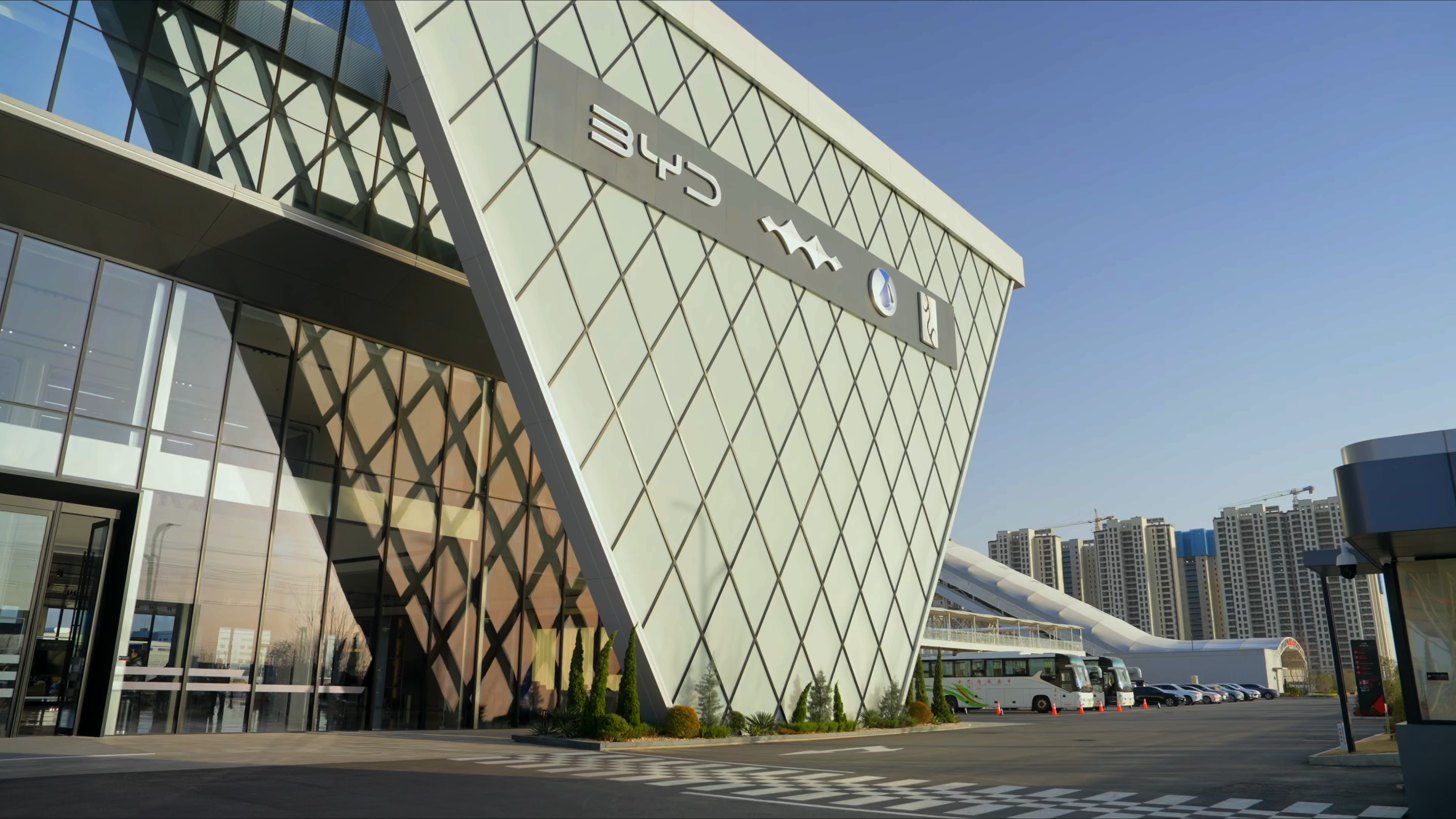
- BYD All-Terrain Circuit entrance in Zhengzhou, Henan
- Type: Subsidiary
- Industry: Automotive
- Predecessor: Xi'an Qinchuan Automobile Co., Ltd.
- Founded: January 2003; 23 years ago
- Founder: Wang Chuanfu
- Headquarters: Xi'an, Shaanxi, China; Shenzhen, Guangdong, China
- Area served: Worldwide (except United States)
- Key people: Wang Chuanfu (Chairman, President & CEO); Stella Li (executive vice president); Wolfgang Egger (design director)
- Products: Automobiles
- Production output: ▲4,602,436 vehicles (2025)
- Brands: BYD; Denza; Fangchengbao; Yangwang; Linghui; RIDE (BYD USA)
- Services: Automotive finance; Vehicle insurance
- Revenue: ▲CN¥804 billion (US$116 billion) (2025)
- Parent: BYD Company (99%)

Chinese name
- Simplified Chinese: 比亚迪汽车有限公司
- Traditional Chinese: 比亞迪汽車有限公司
- Hanyu Pinyin: Bǐyàdí Qìchē Yǒuxiàn Gōngsī
- Website: byd.com; byd.com/cn (China)

BYD Auto Co., Ltd. (Chinese: 比亚迪汽车; pinyin: Bǐyàdí Qìchē) is the automotive subsidiary of BYD Company, a publicly listed Chinese multinational manufacturing company. It manufactures passenger battery electric vehicles (BEVs) and plug-in hybrid electric vehicles (PHEVs)—collectively known as new energy vehicles (NEVs) in China—along with electric buses and electric trucks. The company sells its vehicles under its main BYD brand as well as its high-end brands, which are Denza, Fangchengbao and Yangwang, and its commercial-focused brand, Linghui.

BYD Auto was established in January 2003 as a subsidiary of BYD Company, a battery manufacturer, following the acquisition and restructuring of Xi'an Qinchuan Automobile. The first car designed by BYD, the petrol engined BYD F3, began production in 2005. In 2008, BYD launched its first plug-in hybrid electric vehicle, the BYD F3DM, followed by the BYD e6, its first battery electric vehicle, in 2009.

Since 2020, BYD Auto has experienced substantial sales growth that is driven by the increasing market share of new energy vehicles in China. The company has expanded into overseas markets from 2021, mainly to Europe, Southeast Asia, Oceania and the Americas. In 2022, BYD ended production of purely internal combustion engined vehicles to focus on new energy vehicles.

The company is characterised by its extensive vertical integration, leveraging BYD group's expertise in producing batteries and other related components such as electric motors and electronic controls. Most components used in BYD vehicles are claimed to be produced in-house within the group. As of 2024, BYD's battery subsidiary FinDreams Battery is the world's second largest producer of electric vehicle batteries behind CATL. It specialises in lithium iron phosphate (LFP) batteries, including BYD's proprietary Blade battery.

BYD has become the best-selling car brand in China in 2023, after surpassing Volkswagen, which had held the title since the liberalisation of the Chinese automotive industry. In 2025, nearly 77 percent of BYD's sales came from the Chinese market. BYD is also the third most valuable car manufacturer in the world, based on market capitalization. In 2025, BYD became the world's largest electric carmaker, overtaking Tesla, and overtook Ford to be 6th in total automobile sales.

The company has faced scrutiny and criticism related to its business practices, including allegations of aggressive price reductions, labor issues at its facilities, and various environmental concerns.

== History ==
=== 2003–2008: Establishment and early years ===
BYD Company was founded in 1995 as a battery manufacturer. In January 2003, BYD Company founder Wang Chuanfu established BYD Auto after acquiring and renaming a struggling small automotive manufacturer, Xi'an Qinchuan Automobile, from the state-owned defence company Norinco. The company was acquired for HK$269 million in exchange for a 77% stake, shortly after BYD raised HK$1.6 billion on the Hong Kong Stock Exchange in July 2002. The acquisition was met with disapproval from shareholders, as the plan had not been disclosed in the prospectus. Wang Chuanfu acquired Qinchuan with the intention of developing battery-powered electric vehicles, leveraging BYD's expertise in battery manufacturing. As Qinchuan had been manufacturing cars since 1987, the purchase gave BYD access to car manufacturing technology and an automobile production licence that was difficult to obtain at that time. At the time of the acquisition, Qinchuan was producing a small car called the QCJ7181 Flyer, which BYD renamed the BYD Flyer from 2005. Limited capacity at the former Qinchuan manufacturing plant in Xi'an, Shaanxi prompted BYD to construct a new manufacturing plant in the Xi'an Development Zone within the city.

The first car developed by BYD, codenamed 316, was rejected by dealers due to its poor styling and was scrapped before reaching the market, writing off CN¥100 million in research and development (R&D) expenses. Wang Chuanfu personally destroyed the prototype. The company instead developed the BYD F3 sedan, which entered production on 16 April 2005, with a price of CN¥73,000 (approximately US$10,000). Bearing a resemblance to the Toyota Corolla but offered at a lower price, the F3 gained popularity and became a successful model, with over 63,000 units sold in its first year. The 100,000th F3 rolled off the assembly line on 18 June 2007, 20 months after production began. Following this success, the larger BYD F6 sedan, modelled after the Honda Accord, entered production in August 2007. Initially, BYD cars were equipped with older Mitsubishi Motors engines manufactured in China, but within a few years BYD Auto developed its own engines by modifying Mitsubishi engine designs.

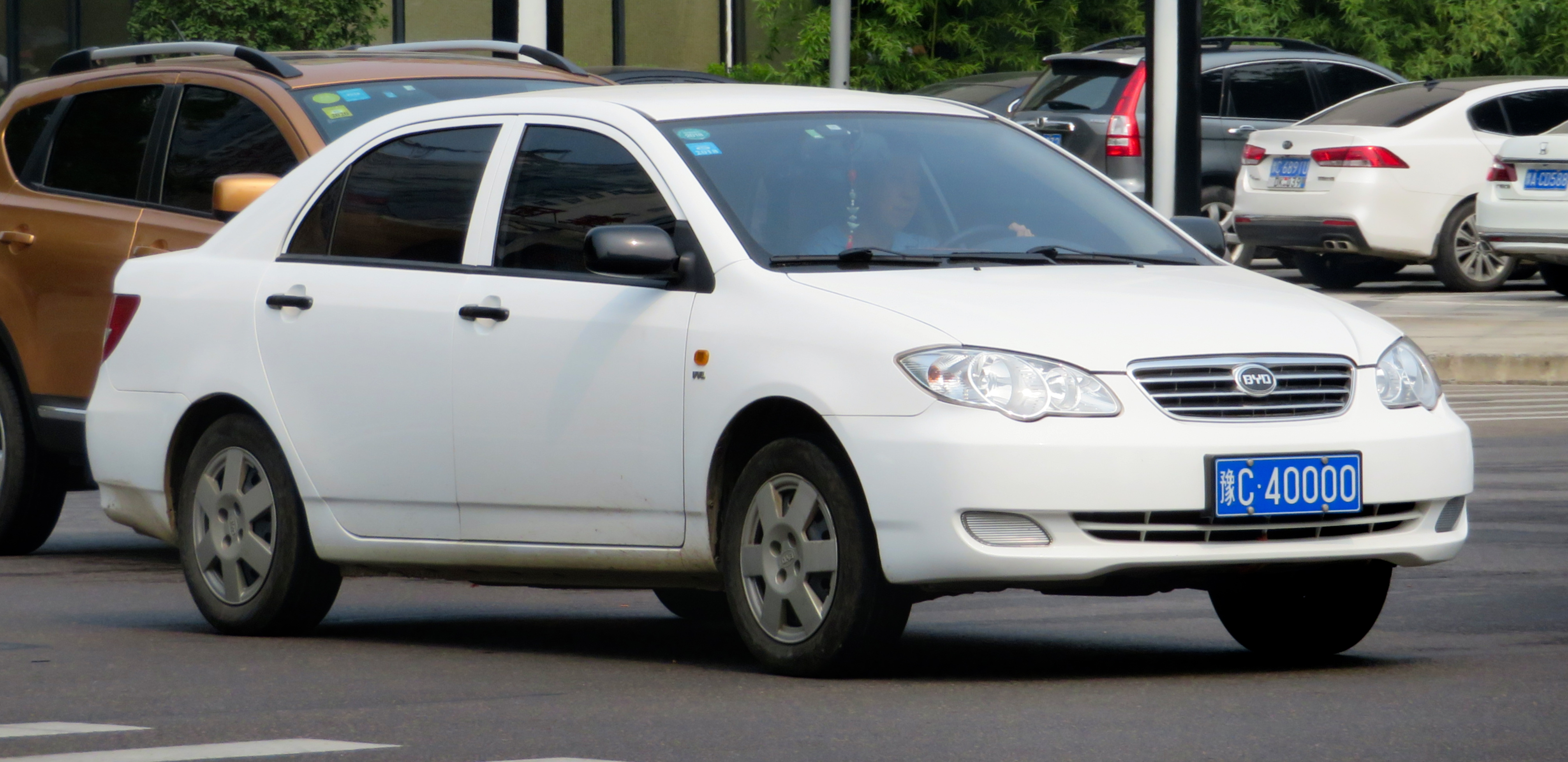
The BYD F3, the first vehicle designed by BYD, was produced from 2005 to 2019.

During its early years, BYD Auto achieved growth by reverse engineering competitors' products and supplier parts, and by maintaining tight control over costs. The BYD F3, the company's first mass-produced passenger car, has been described as "a copycat" of the Toyota Corolla. The BYD F0 was described as "a clear copy" of the Toyota Aygo, and the BYD S8 bears a similar appearance to the Mercedes-Benz SL-Class, with an "almost identical" Mercedes-Benz CLK front end and a Renault Mégane CC rear. Wang Chuanfu responded by stating the company used only "non-patented technologies". In 2009, the United States government was advised by its consulate general in Guangzhou that BYD employed an approach of "copying and then modifying car designs." However, according to the consul, BYD had modified the vehicle designs sufficiently to satisfy Chinese courts that no patents had been infringed.

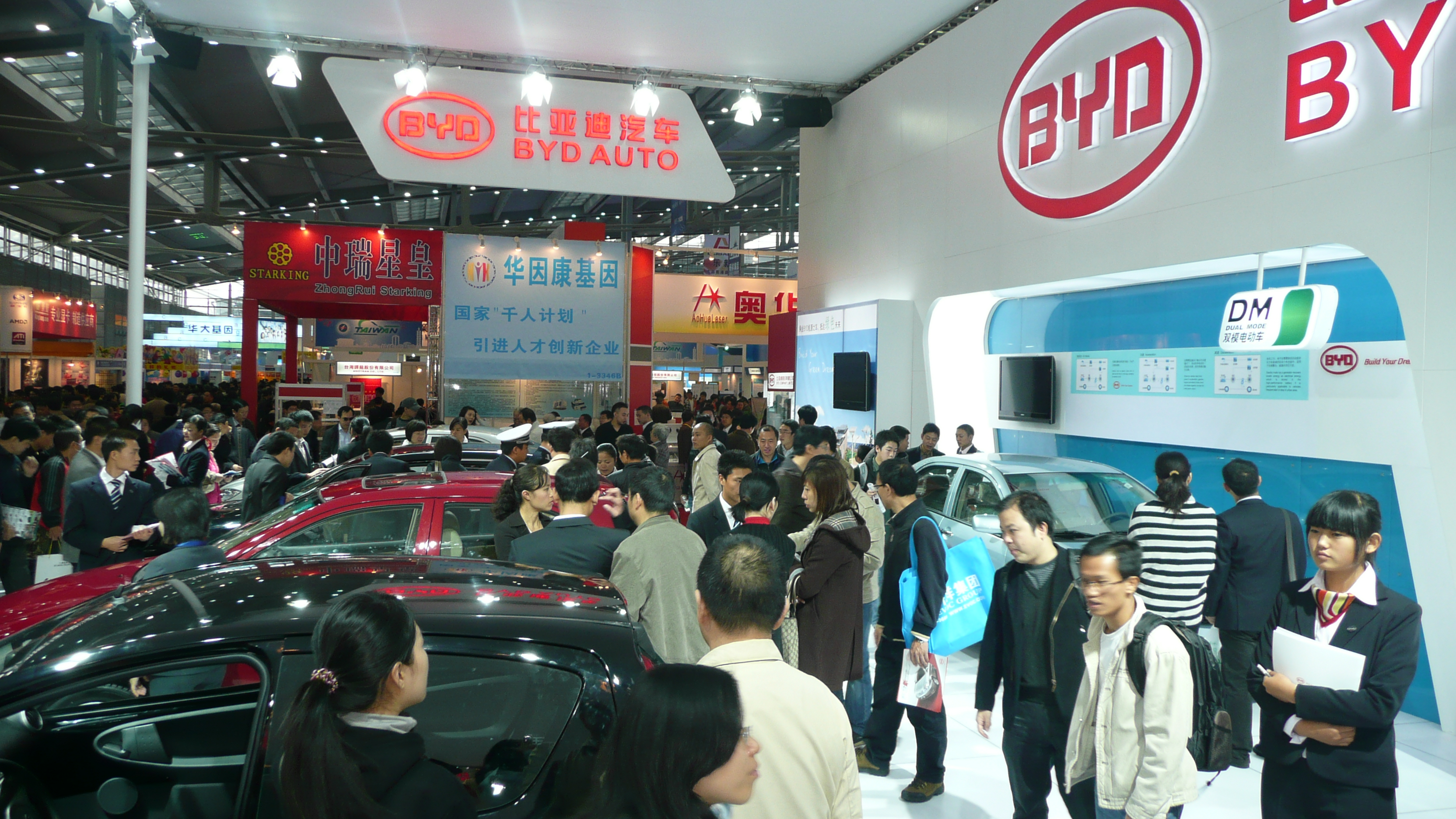
The BYD stand at the 2009 Central China High-Tech Fair in Shenzhen

In 2005, BYD Auto contributed 10% of BYD Company's total revenue. As its automotive business expanded, this share rose to 25% by 2006. In the first half of 2009, BYD Auto accounted for 55% of the parent company's total revenue, the first time its automotive division had contributed more than half of overall earnings. By 2008, BYD Auto operated two vehicle assembly plants in Xi'an and Shenzhen with a combined production capacity of 300,000 units per year, alongside an R&D and testing centre in Shanghai and a moulding plant in Beijing.

Following years of sales growth, widespread withdrawal of BYD dealerships was reported in major Chinese cities during 2010, attributable to excessively rapid expansion, a limited model range, and internal competition that created difficulties for dealers. The situation was compounded by BYD's emphasis on production capacity over product quality. In response, BYD reduced its annual production target from 800,000 to 600,000 vehicles; however, actual output fell short of the revised target, reaching only 517,000 units that year. Over the subsequent three years, BYD redirected its focus toward resolving concerns related to quality, dealer channel management, and brand development.

=== 2006–2020: New energy vehicle efforts and sales stagnation ===
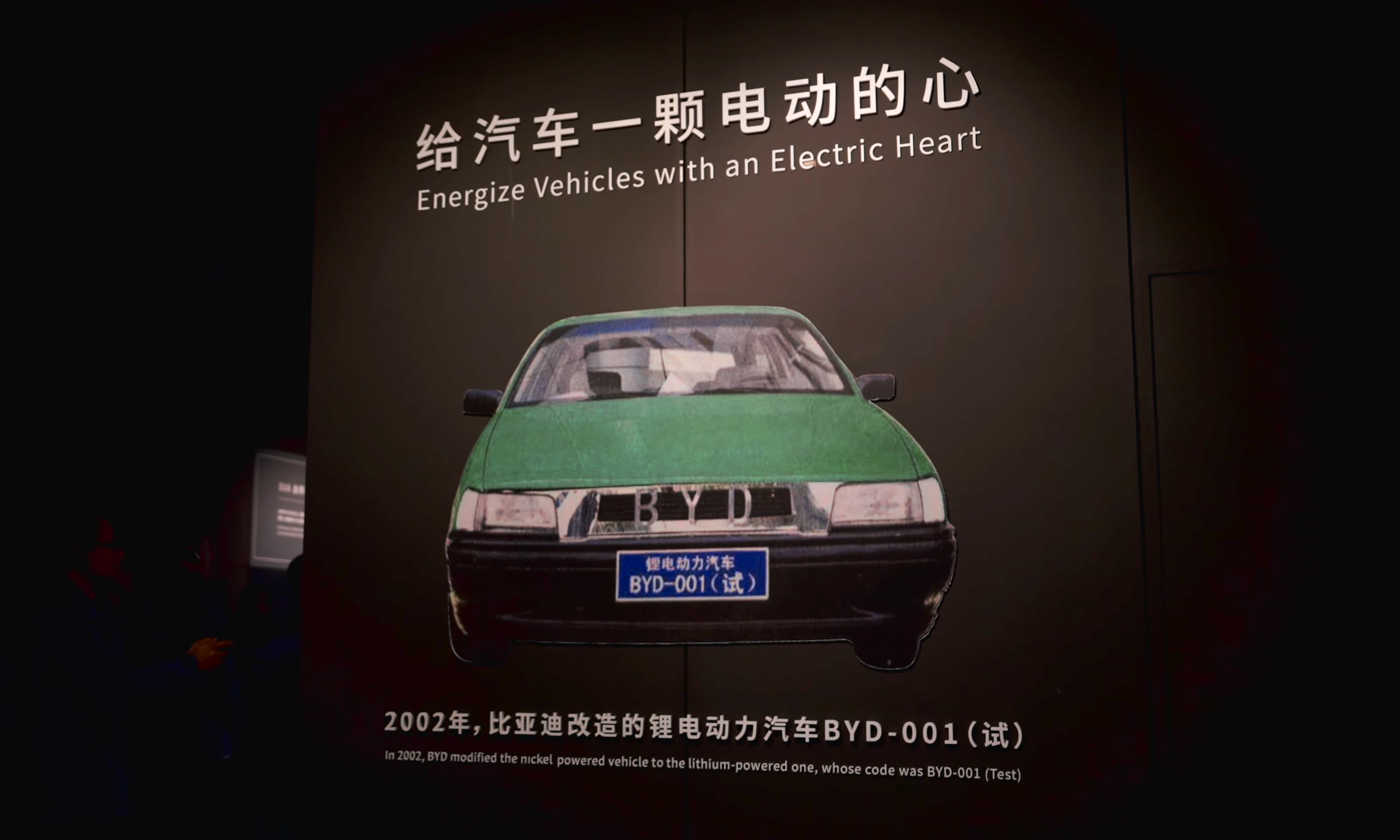
Picture of BYD's first experimental electric vehicle, labeled the "BYD-001 (Test)"

BYD began exploring hybrid and electric vehicles as early as 1997, before acquiring Xi'an Qinchuan Automobile. In that year, Wang Chuanfu, as part of his research into electric vehicles, purchased a BJ6490D, an electric car made by Beijing Second Auto Works that was built off an imported knock-down kit of the Holden Commodore VN station wagon. The BJ6490D was powered by golf cart batteries, with a range of about 100 km (62 mi) and a top speed of 92 km/h (57 mph). Later, BYD acquired a second BJ6490D, later converted into a hybrid vehicle.

At the 2004 Beijing Auto Show, alongside its petrol-powered concept cars, BYD unveiled the BYD Flyer EF3, an electric sedan. Based on the BYD Flyer, the Flyer EF3 was initially intended for production in 2005, with a focus on serving as a taxi in Shenzhen. However, this plan did not materialise. Two years later at the 2006 Beijing Auto Show, BYD showcased another electric car, the BYD F3e. Based on the BYD F3, it had an all-electric range of more than 300 km (186 mi), and was planned to be produced within three years from 2007. In December 2010, a BYD Auto general manager confirmed that the company had cancelled plans for its production due to the lack of support in charging infrastructure.

In 2006, BYD established the Electric Vehicle Research Institute, dedicated to the R&D and trial production of parts for new energy vehicles and the whole vehicle, including battery electric vehicles and plug-in hybrid vehicles.

In 2008, Wang Chuanfu set a goal for the company to become the leader in the Chinese automotive market by 2015, and the largest car manufacturer globally by 2025. Wang stated that electric vehicles would serve as BYD's "stepping stone" to skip the development of internal combustion engine vehicles and facilitate the company's entry into international markets, including Europe and North America.

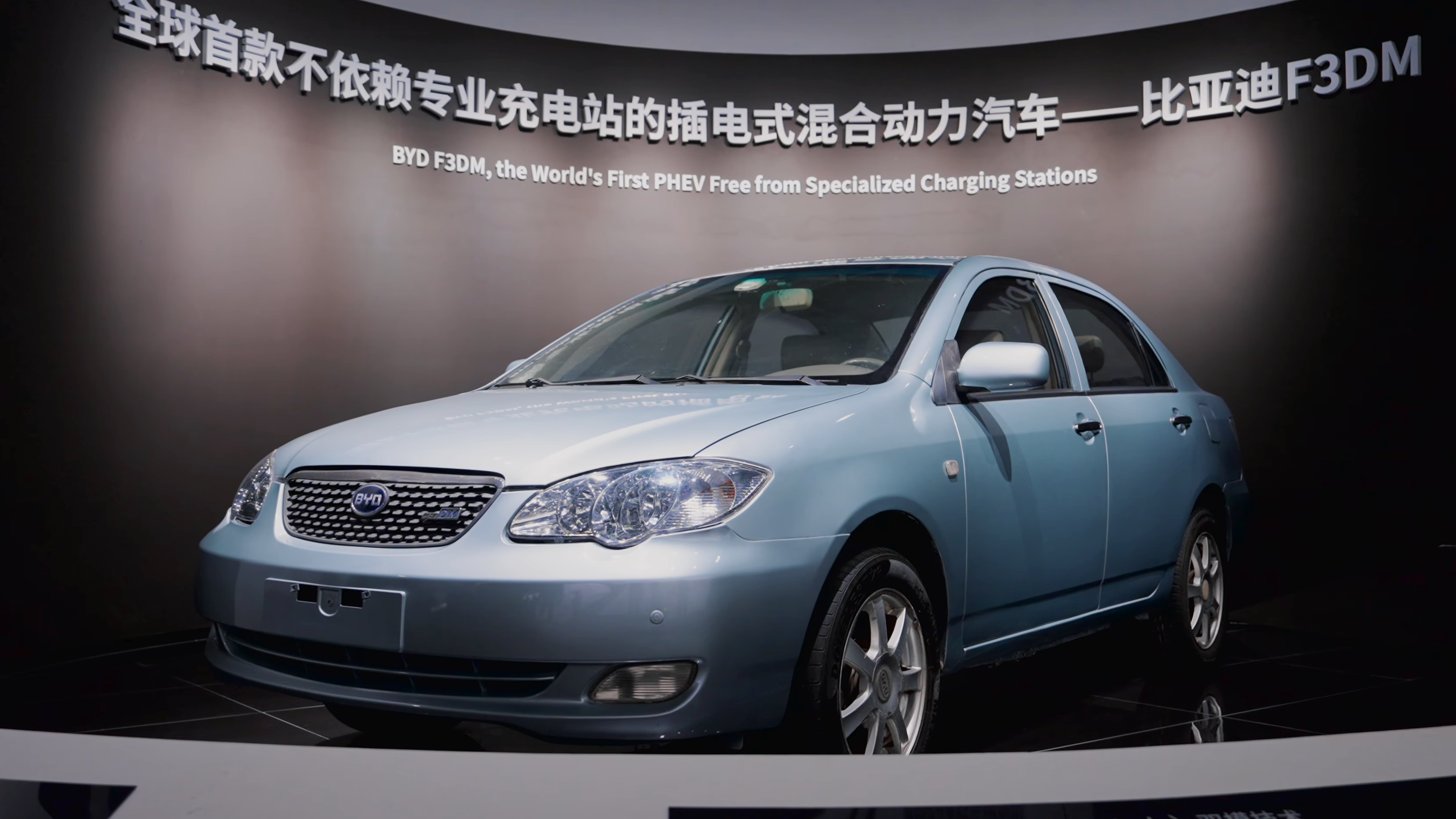
The 2008 BYD F3DM at the BYD Museum. It is the first modern, mass-produced plug-in hybrid vehicle globally.

In March 2008, the plug-in hybrid electric version of the BYD F3, the F3DM, was introduced as the world's first production model plug-in hybrid car at the Geneva Motor Show in Switzerland. Initially, the F3DM was offered in China as a fleet vehicle for governments, banks and other institutions, until retail sales started in March 2010 when the Chinese government started granting subsidies for new energy vehicles as part of the Government’s overall total R&D investment of 230 billion. The vehicle had low sales, with only 100 units sold by 2011.

In January 2009, BYD introduced its first production battery electric vehicle, the e6 at the 2009 North American International Auto Show in Detroit. It is powered by a battery pack codenamed "Fe", which provides a claimed electric range of 400 km (249 mi). While plans to sell the vehicle to the general public in the US were shelved, the company sold the e6 in the US as a fleet vehicle in a limited number.

In May 2009, Volkswagen AG considered forming a partnership with BYD in the area of hybrids and electric vehicles, having signed a memorandum of understanding. Volkswagen withdrew from the partnership after conducting due diligence.

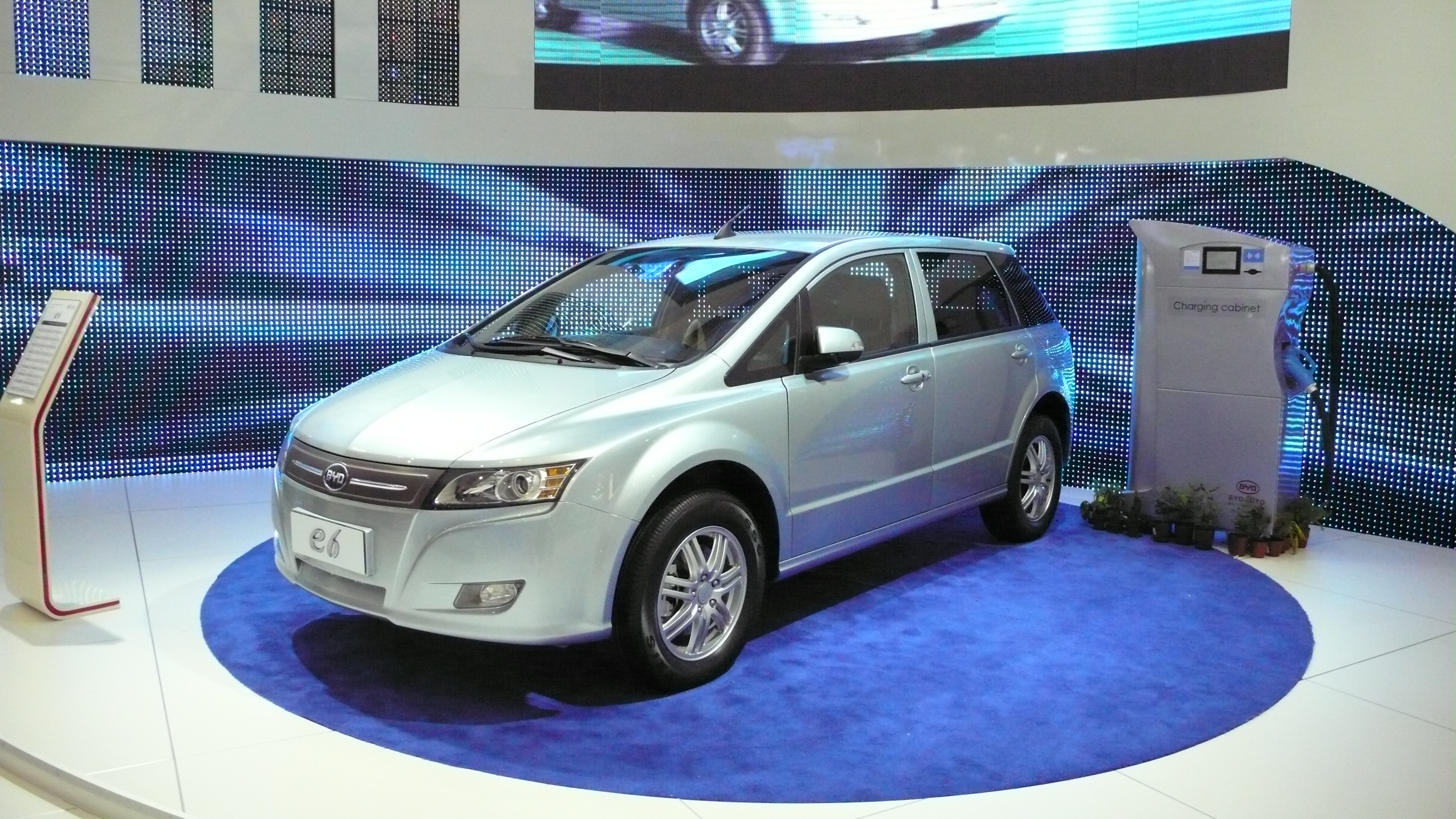
The BYD e6, showcased at the 2010 North American International Auto Show in Detroit, US

In July 2009, BYD acquired Hunan Midea Coach Company, a bus manufacturer based in Hunan, allowing it to manufacture buses and coaches and enter the commercial vehicle market. The plant in Changsha, Hunan, reportedly received a CN¥ 3 billion investment for development. BYD started producing battery electric buses as part of a pilot scheme initiated by the Chinese government. It signed a deal to supply 1,000 BYD K9 electric buses to the Hunan Government in China. The buses have a range of 305 km (190 mi) per charge with a top speed of 70 km/h (43 mph), a charging time of six hours and 50% fast charging in 30 minutes.

In 2010, BYD Auto Industry Co., Ltd. and Daimler AG, now known as Mercedes-Benz Group AG, formed a 50-50 joint venture named Shenzhen BYD Daimler New Technology with a brand named Denza to focus on research and development of new energy vehicles. The brand showcased a concept car called the Denza EV at Auto China in April 2012. Denza was later restructured in 2021, when BYD took control of the brand by taking a 90% stake in the venture. Mercedes-Benz withdrew entirely from the joint venture in September 2024.

In August 2013, BYD launched the Dynasty Series product line with the introduction of the BYD Qin, a plug-in hybrid electric vehicle variant of the petrol-engine BYD Surui. The Qin was designed to replace the BYD F3DM, an earlier plug-in hybrid model. The Qin quickly became the best-selling plug-in electric vehicle of early 2014.

In November 2016, the company hired Wolfgang Egger as BYD Auto's head of design. Egger, who built his career at Alfa Romeo, Audi, and SEAT, created his first design for BYD, the Dynasty concept, a concept electric SUV that was displayed at the 2017 Shanghai Auto Show and previewed the design of the second-generation BYD Tang.

Before 2020, BYD heavily relied on government subsidies to generate profit from its plug-in hybrid and battery electric vehicles. In 2016, the company received approximately US$1 billion in new energy vehicle subsidies, surpassing its net profit for that year, and accounted for over 20% of BYD's US$5 billion in revenue from new energy vehicle sales that year. Rhodium Group estimates that BYD received approximately US$4.3 billion in state support between 2015 and 2020.

Between 2017 and 2019, BYD faced challenges due to a reduction in government subsidies. This led to a significant slowdown in sales and a sharp decline in net profit over three consecutive years. In 2019, the company's net profit dropped to only CN¥1.6 billion. During this period, Wang Chuanfu stated that the company's primary goal was merely "to survive".

=== 2020–present: rapid growth and global expansion ===
BYD experienced a substantial surge in vehicle sales from 2020 to 2024. The company sold 4,272,145 vehicles globally in 2024, a ten-fold increase compared to the 2020 figure of 427,302 vehicles. The increase was partly attributed to the increasing popularity of new energy vehicles in China, which accounted for 27.5% of vehicle sales in China in 2022, up from 5.8% in 2020.

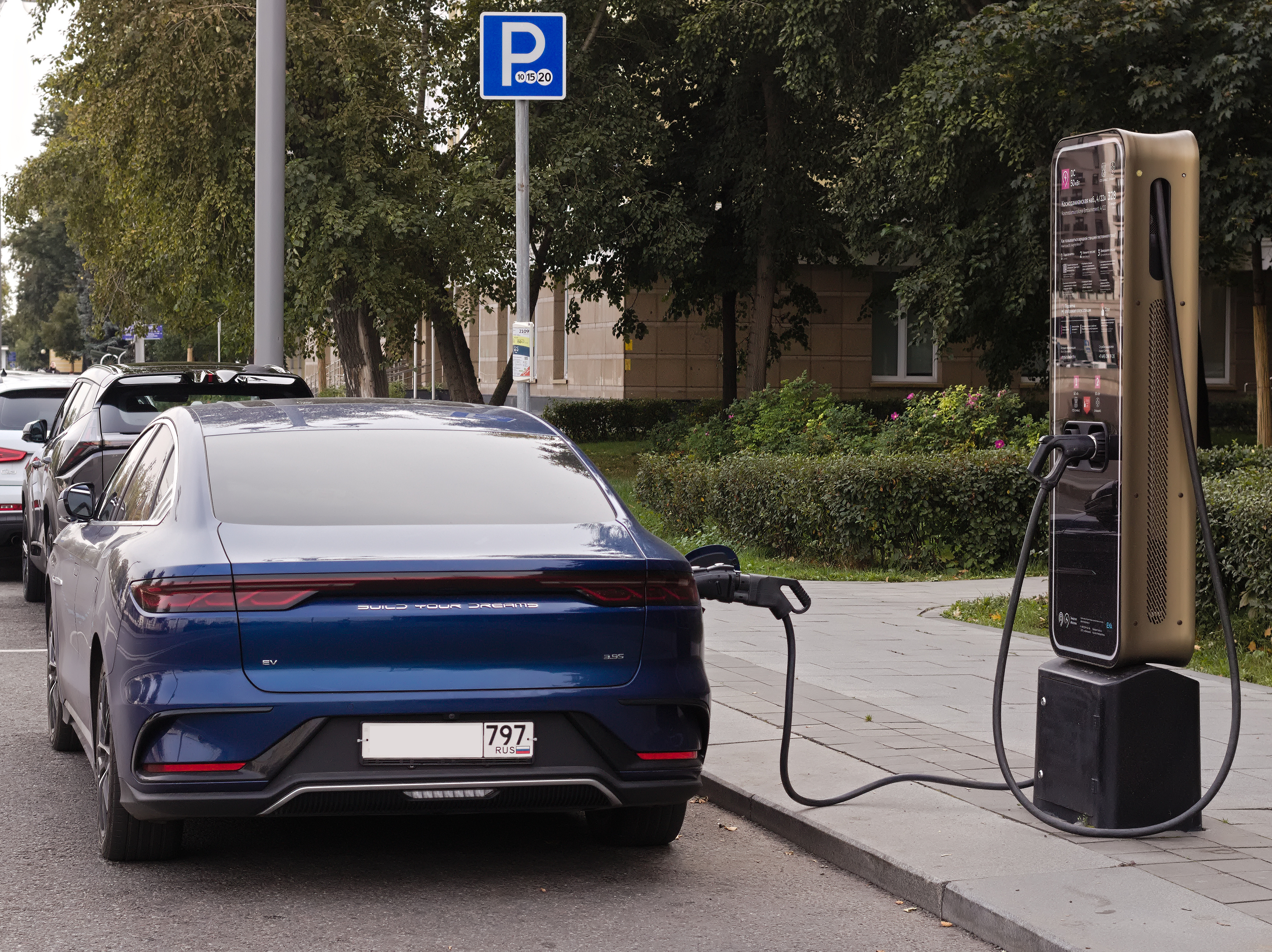
A BYD Han EV in a charging station

BYD introduced its first vehicle equipped with the Blade battery, the BYD Han large sedan, in early 2020. The Han went on sale in July 2020 with an option of plug-in hybrid electric (Han DM) and battery electric (Han EV) variants. The range-topping variant of the Han EV was claimed to be the fastest electric car in China, while the DM version was the fastest hybrid sedan. BYD announced its entry to the European passenger car market in May 2020, starting with Norway. The first batch of 100 BYD Tang EVs equipped with the Blade battery were sent to Norway in June 2021.

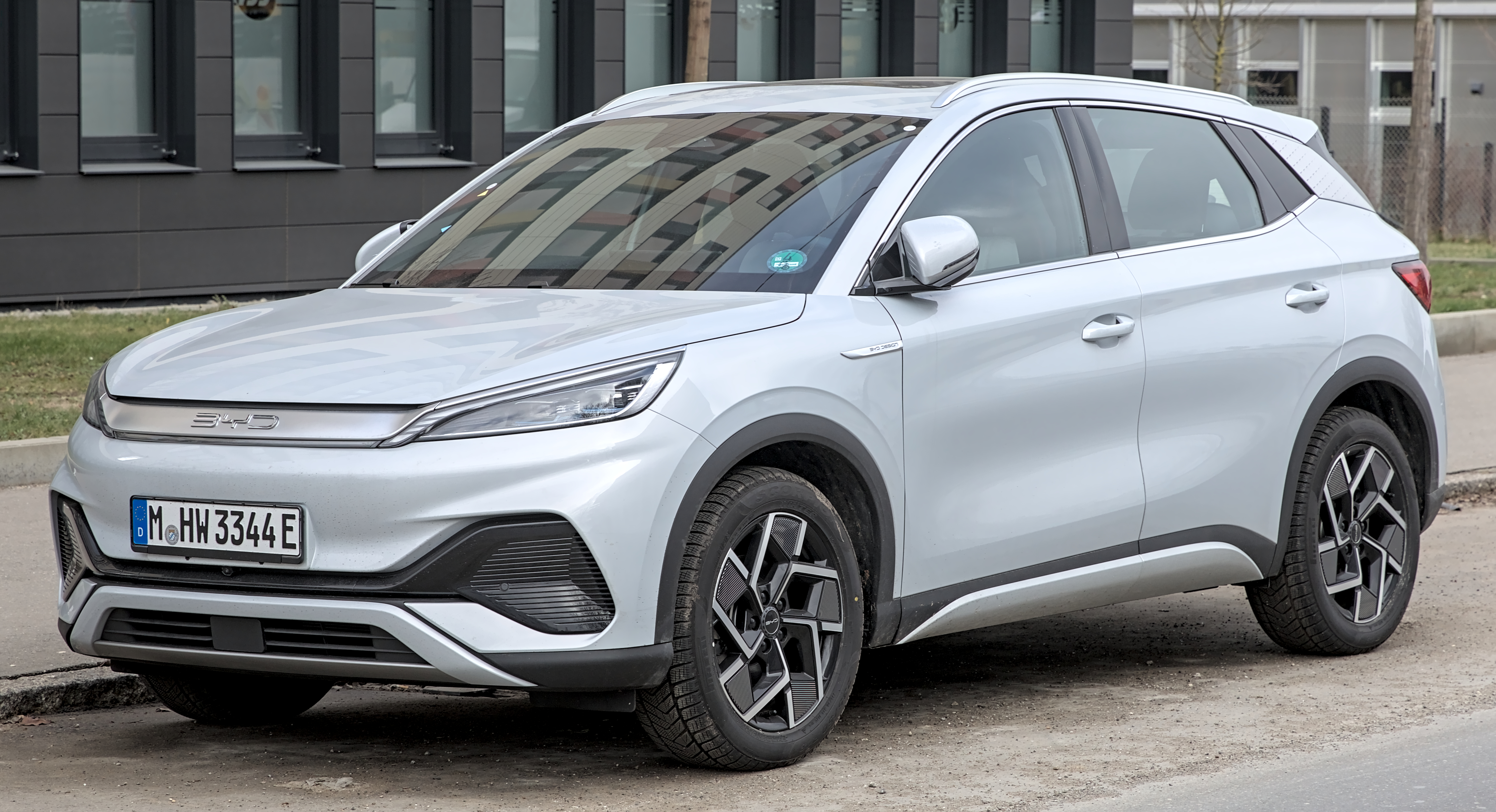
The BYD Atto 3 / Yuan Plus helped increase the sales of BYDs globally; it is one of the best selling electric cars in Australia.

In April 2021, BYD introduced the e-Platform 3.0, a third-generation platform for battery electric vehicles that integrated and standardised core components along with a new body structure, new electrical architecture, and operating system. The platform began production starting with the BYD Dolphin and the BYD Yuan Plus that were announced in August 2021. It also established the Ocean Series line of products, which consists of models named after marine animals. In December 2021, Daimler AG reduced its stake in its joint venture brand with BYD Auto from 50% to 10%, with BYD Auto controlling 90%. BYD refreshed Denza's line-up with the release of the Denza D9 minivan in 2022, followed by the Denza N7 SUV in 2023. In March 2022, BYD ended the production of pure internal combustion engine vehicles.

In January 2023, BYD established its second premium brand called Yangwang by introducing the Yangwang U8 plug-in hybrid electric large SUV, and the Yangwang U9 battery electric supercar. The company further expanded its brand portfolio by introducing the Fangchengbao brand in June 2023, which focuses on off-road vehicles.

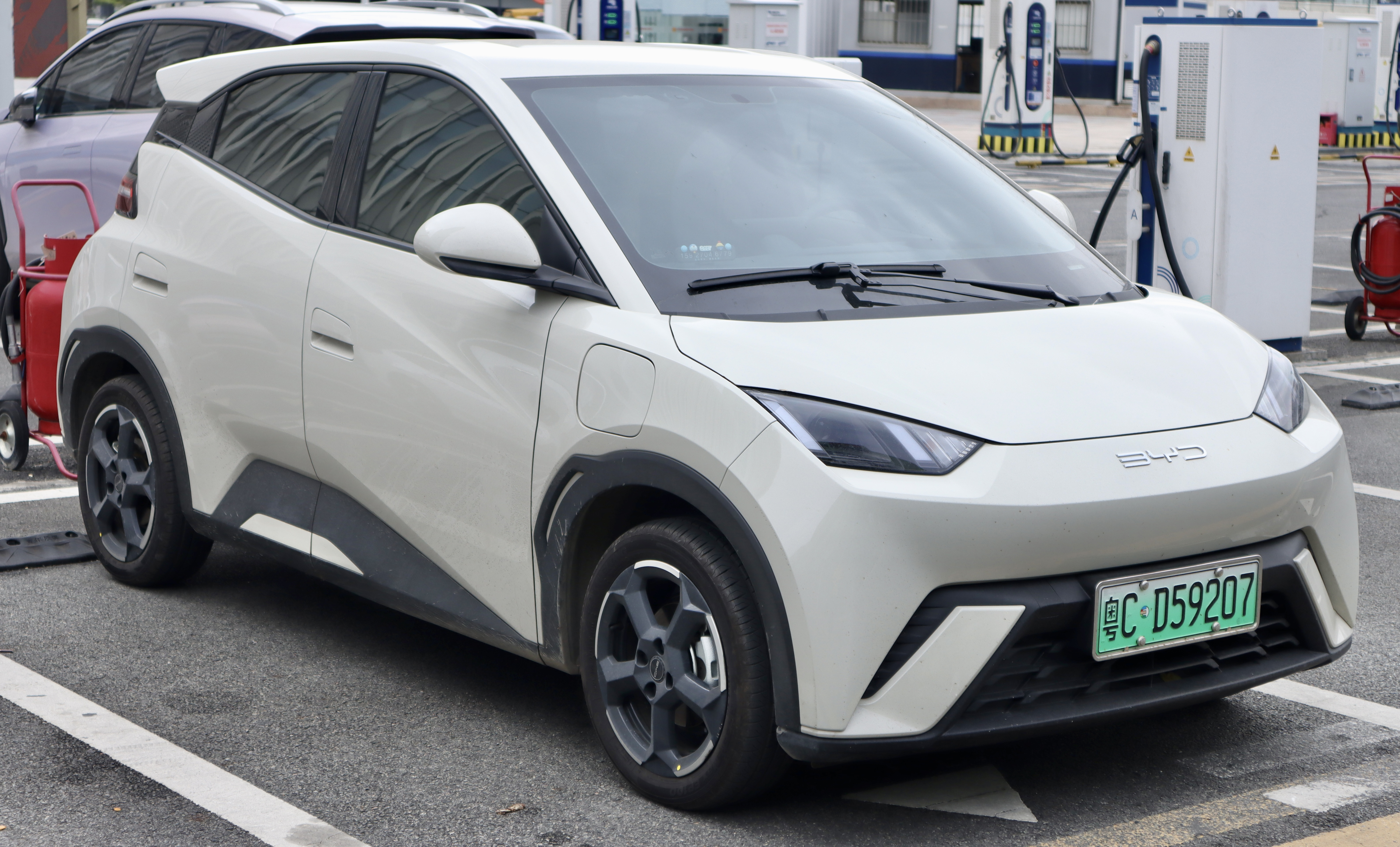
2023 BYD Seagull

In April 2023, BYD released its smallest and cheapest battery electric vehicle called the Seagull. It features a 4-seater, 5-door configuration in a hatchback body style, while being priced in a segment dominated by smaller 3-door cars. The car became a sales success in China. On 29 November 2023, BYD produced the 200,000th Seagull after only seven months in the market. Due to its low cost of production and its low selling price at below CN¥90,000 or US$12,000, the Seagull has garnered curiosity and praise from international media and industry experts.

While celebrating BYD's 5,000,000th new energy vehicle production in August 2023, Wang Chuanfu called on local Chinese car manufacturers to "unite" to take on foreign manufacturers, responding to the severe price war in the Chinese market throughout 2023. Wang claims that it is "an emotional need for the 1.4 billion Chinese people to see a Chinese brand becoming global," and initiated a campaign titled "Together, we are Chinese autos" (Chinese: 在一起，才是中国汽车). The call was welcomed by the CEOs of Nio and Li Auto.

On 18 November 2024, BYD held an event in Shenzhen to celebrate its 30th anniversary and becoming the first automaker globally to produce 10,000,000 new energy vehicles. The milestone vehicle was a Denza Z9.

In early 2023 and early 2024, BYD introduced the Champion Edition and Honor Edition versions of its models, respectively, featuring price reductions aimed at expanding market share in the Chinese market. The strategy contributed to an intensified price war in the market, prompting Chinese authorities to advise BYD to avoid further price reductions. In response, on 10 February 2025, BYD introduced Smart Driving Edition versions across 21 models, featuring enhanced advanced driver assistance systems (ADAS) marketed as TianShen, including city-level NOA (Navigate on Autopilot), with prices starting at 100,000 yuan. The update aims to offer additional features without increasing prices.

In July 2025, BYD recorded its first monthly delivery drop of the year, shipping 341,030 vehicles compared with 377,628 in June, and nearly flat versus the same month in 2024. In the second quarter of 2025, BYD posted its first profit decline in more than three years, with net income down 29.9% year-on-year to 6.4 billion yuan. In September 2025, BYD announced internally and to its suppliers had cut its annual sales target by up to 16% to 4.6 million units, down from the 5.5 million originally guided in March. Wang Chuanfu stated the reason for the sales drop was because BYD's technological lead were not as strong as the previous years, and promised to launch "major technological announcements" in 2026. Despite the cut, by the end of 2025, BYD had overtaken Ford Motor Company in terms of vehicles sold per year. The "major technological announcements" were revealed in March 2026, which included the second-generation Blade battery alongside an ultra-fast Flash Charging technology, enabling compatible vehicles to charge from a 10% to 70% state of charge in 5 minutes, and from 10% to 97% in 9 minutes.

== Marketing ==
=== Branding ===
BYD Auto's original logo was used between 2003 and 2007. According to the company, the blue and white colours represent the sky and the clouds respectively. The logo was criticised due to its resemblance to the BMW roundel. It was replaced with the logo used by its parent company upon the introduction of the BYD F1 (renamed to F0 later). On 1 January 2021, BYD Auto adopted a new brand logo, while other BYD businesses retained the older logo. On 17 February 2022, the logo of BYD Auto was slightly revised with a narrower width to follow graphic design trends, coinciding with the introduction of the new BYD Company logo.

As the name "BYD" had no particular meaning, BYD Auto started adopting the slogan "Build Your Dreams" since it participated in the 2008 North American International Auto Show in the US. In 2017, when the company released the second-generation BYD Tang, BYD Auto started placing "Build Your Dreams" badging at the rear of its vehicles, replacing the standard oval BYD logo. The badging was retained until late 2023, when the company announced that the badging would be dropped in favour of the three-letter BYD logo due to widespread criticisms.

==== Logo history ====
2003–2007

2007–2021

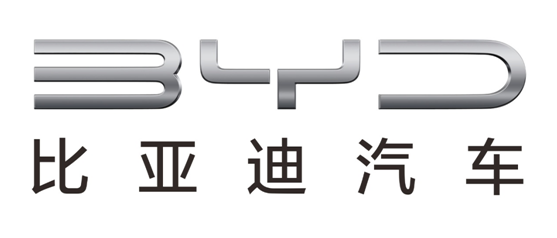
2021–2022 (wider than the current logo)

2022–present

=== Advertising and sponsorships ===
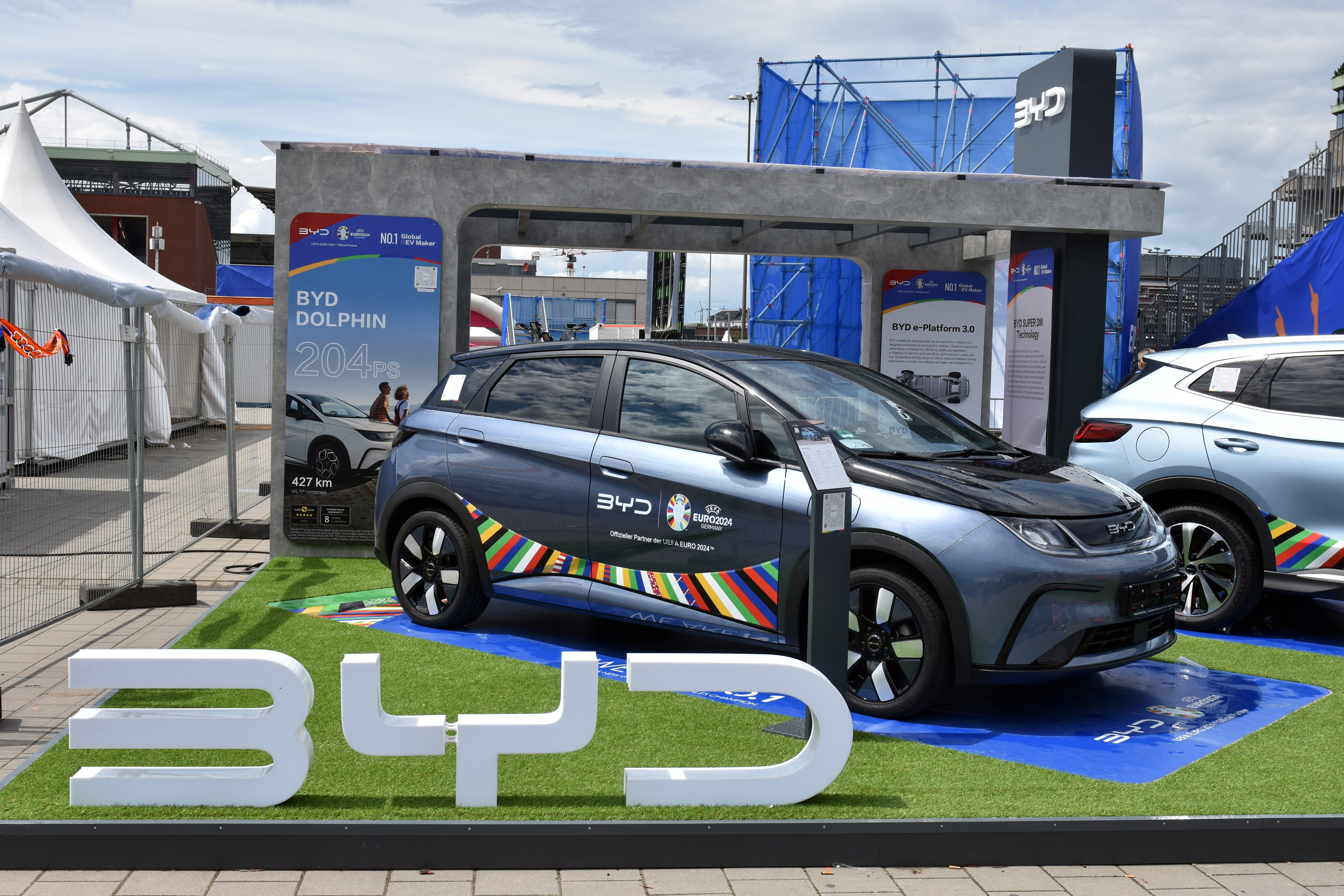
BYD stand at UEFA Euro 2024 Fan Zone Hamburg, Germany

In December 2016, BYD signed American actor Leonardo DiCaprio as the brand's global brand ambassador for new energy vehicles.

In January 2024, BYD signed a deal with UEFA to be the official partner of UEFA European Football Championship 2024, replacing Volkswagen as the competition's mobility partner. Later, in May, BYD was announced by CONMEBOL as an official partner for the 2024 Copa América. In October 2024, BYD announced a global strategic partnership with Game Science's action role-playing game Black Myth: Wukong, becoming its exclusive automotive brand partner.

== Global markets ==
Top 8 BYD vehicle sales by country, 2025
Rank	Location	Vehicle sales (2025)
1	China	3,528,545
2	Brazil	112,929
3	Mexico	75,157
4	Indonesia	54,185
5	Australia	52,415
6	United Kingdom	51,422
7	Turkey	45,537
8	Thailand	44,666

BYD started exporting its cars in 2005 to Russia, when the company introduced the BYD Flyer hatchback at the 2005 Moscow International Motor Show. In 2009, BYD started exporting cars to Africa, South America, and the Middle East. Since 2021, BYD started expanding its global presence rapidly by prioritizing exports of passenger electric vehicles. Beginning in 2022, BYD has committed to producing right-hand drive versions of several battery electric passenger models for exports to left-hand traffic countries such as Australia, the UK and Thailand. These include newer models with BYD's third-generation platform (e-Platform 3.0) such as the Atto 3 (the export version of the Yuan Plus), Dolphin and Seal. For the Dolphin, the company had also done an extensive reengineering to ensure the small car would achieve the highest ratings in Euro NCAP and Australasian NCAP testing.

Throughout 2023, the company exported over 242,766 passenger new energy vehicles, a year-over-year increase of 334 percent. As of 2023, BYD Auto vehicles are sold in over 70 countries. In 2024, BYD sold 417,204 vehicles overseas. According to Stella Li, the executive vice president of BYD, the company is aiming to deliver 50% of its production output outside its home market. However, an automotive analyst from Bloomberg Intelligence China believes that the target is unlikely to be achieved until 2030 or later.

=== Africa ===
==== South Africa ====
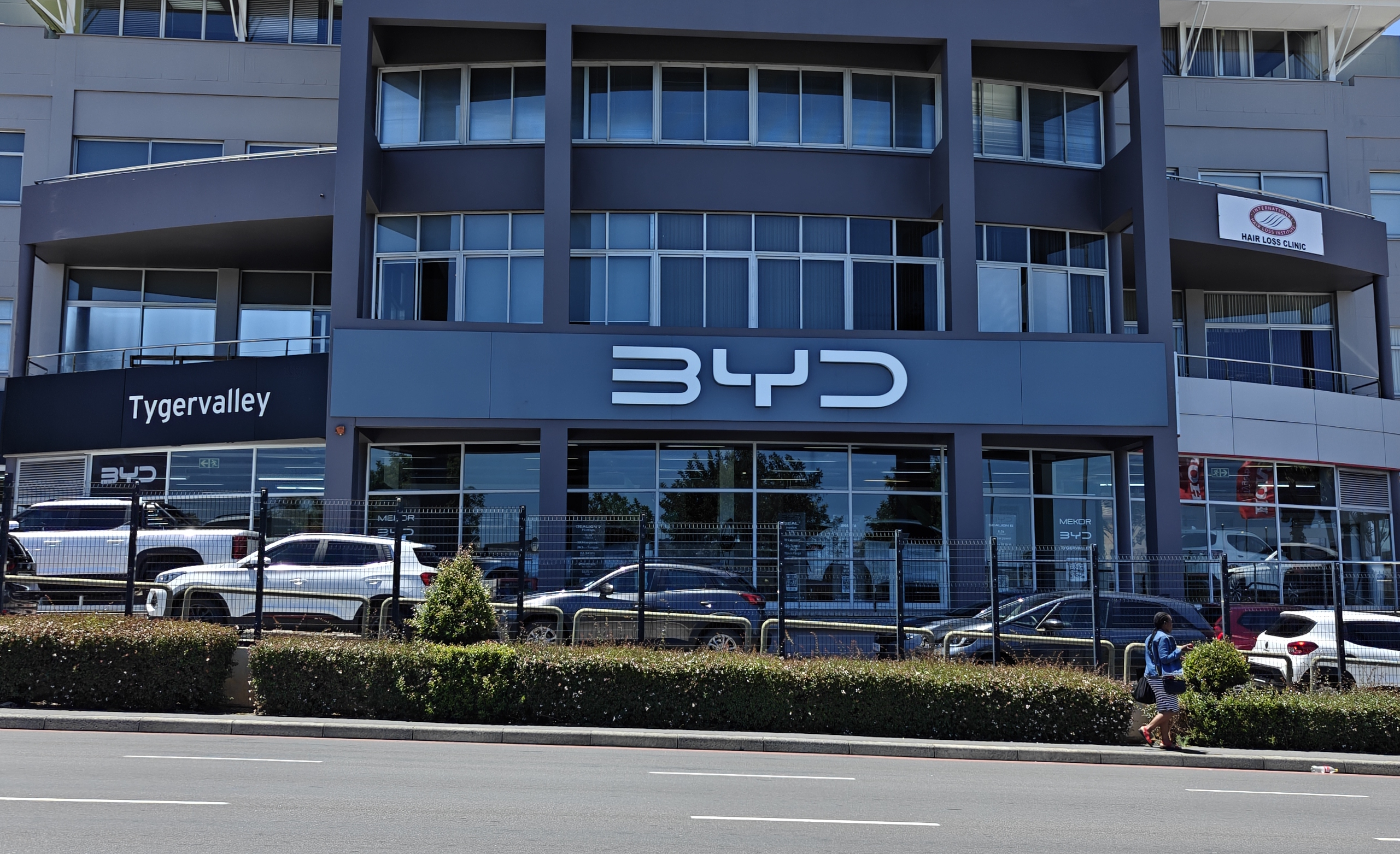
BYD Tygervalley dealership, Cape Town

BYD entered the South African market in 2023, when it hosted an event to launch its Atto 3 EV. The company noted stronger demand for greener alternatives in the South African automotive market, and said that due to the size of SA's economy, there was significant opportunity for electric vehicles such as its own. At launch, BYD also noted the South African government's commitment to significantly reduce greenhouse gas emissions by 2030, stating that this aligned with the company's goal of promoting sustainable transportation by reducing carbon footprints through its technology. BYD has since launched many other models in South Africa, and in 2025, had 18 dealerships across the country, with a plan to increase its network to 30 by the end of Q1 2026. The company also builds electric buses for major Cape Town bus operator Golden Arrow. The latter has around 100 BYD eBus B12s as part of its fleet, with plans to swap all of its diesel buses to electric ones over time. As of December 2025, BYD sells its Sealion 7, Shark 6, Seal, Atto 3, Sealion 6, Sealion 5, Dolphin, and Dolphin Surf models in SA. BYD is also the largest player in the South African public EV charger sector, and is currently rolling out up to 300 charging stations across the country.

=== Asia ===
==== Japan ====
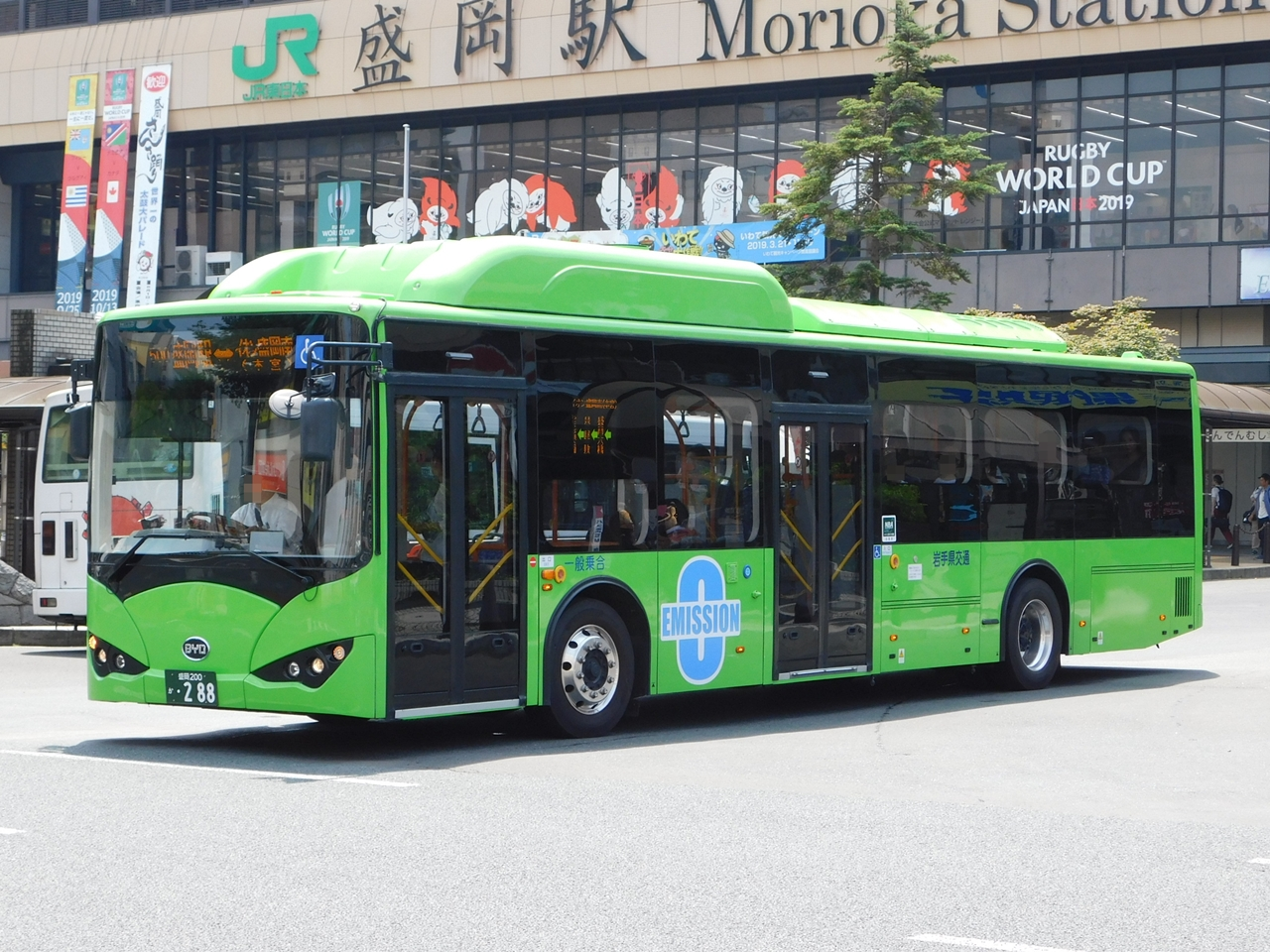
BYD K9 bus in Morioka, Iwate, Japan

In 2015, BYD became the first Chinese manufacturer in Japan to market electric buses. It supplied the K9 large electric bus to bus operator Princess Line in Kyoto. In 2022, BYD held a 70% market share of electric buses in Japan.

In July 2022, BYD announced that sales of its passenger electric cars in Japan would start in 2023. Sales of the BYD Atto 3 began in February 2023, with the company's first sales outlet located in Yokohama. BYD sells its vehicles in Japan through a dealership network rather than through direct sales. The BYD Dolphin was added to the local line-up in September 2023. All BYD models sold in Japan are adapted to local conditions by adopting the CHAdeMO charging standard.

At the 2025 Japan Mobility Show held in October, BYD unveiled the BYD Racco, a battery electric kei car designed exclusively for the Japanese market. The Racco is the first purpose-built kei car model from a non-Japanese manufacturer. The Racco will be manufactured in China and exported to Japan, with sales starting in summer 2026.

In December 2025, BYD launched the Sealion 6 in Japan, marking the company's first plug-in hybrid offering in the country. It was the lowest-priced plug-in hybrid SUV available in Japan at the time of launch. BYD noted that the Sealion 6 had been adapted for the Japanese market, with enhanced rear-seat comfort and reduced vibration based on local consumer feedback.

==== South Korea ====
In 2016, BYD signed a deal to have 3 of its vehicles, K9 electric buses, operated in South Korea for the first time. It launched as the eBUS-12 in 2017, in a ceremony attended by Ministry of Environment officials. In April 2018, the eBus-7 model began running on Jeju Island. In June, the Ministry of Environment began to subsidize the eBUS-12. The bus was also used for the Daejeon government's pilot intra-city electric bus service that year. In 2023, BYD opened an office in Seoul. In January 2025, BYD began selling EVs in the South Korean consumer market. In December 2025, BYD overtook General Motors Korea in terms of unit sales in the South Korean market.

==== Hong Kong ====
BYD started sales of its passenger electric cars in Hong Kong in September 2022, shortly after it finished developing the right-hand drive Atto 3. On 11 June 2023, three BYD showrooms and a service center in Hong Kong were vandalised. Suspects poured red paint on windows and entrances of the buildings. In one case, a car was rammed into the rolling shutter of the showroom in New Territories. The incidents were reported to the police, and operations in these premises were halted for a few days. On 23 June 2023, Hong Kong police announced that 13 people were arrested in connection with the incidents.

In June 2024, BYD started sales of the Denza brand in Hong Kong by introducing the D9 EV minivan. It opened its first Denza flagship store in Kowloon Bay, which is the first presence of the brand outside mainland China.

==== Southeast Asia ====
===== Thailand =====
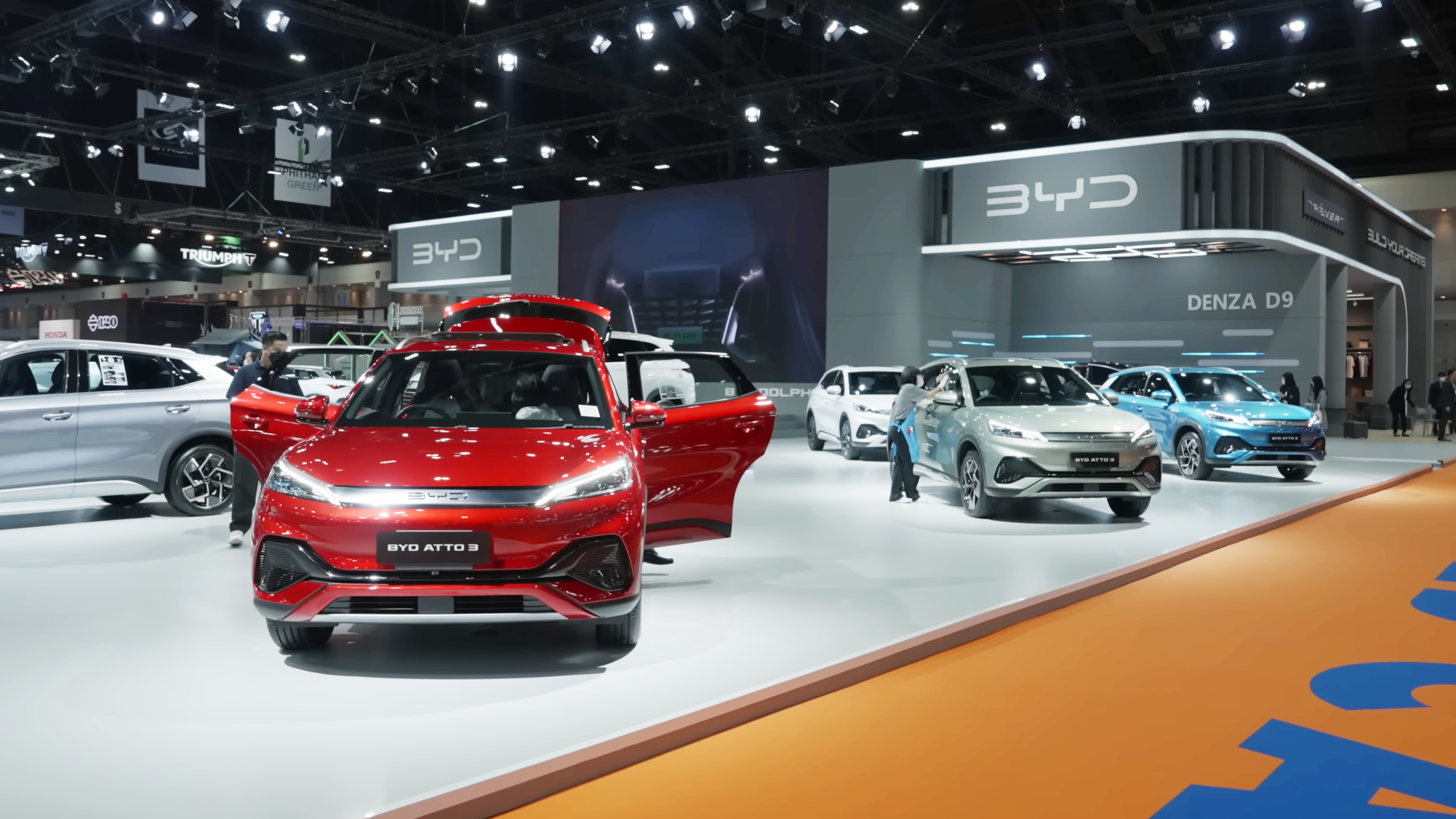
BYD booth at the 2023 Bangkok International Motor Show, Thailand

In October 2022, BYD began selling passenger electric cars in Thailand through a partnership with local company Rêver Automotive. In 2023, BYD announced plans to construct a new electric vehicle manufacturing plant in the Eastern Economic Corridor (EEC) special zone in Rayong, Thailand with an annual capacity of 150,000 vehicles. Construction of the plant began in March 2023. The facility was officially opened on 4 July 2024, coinciding with the production of BYD's 8,000,000th new energy vehicle. This plant is BYD's first wholly owned facility outside of China. It handles stamping, painting, welding, final assembly, and car component production, and is set to employ 10,000 workers. The company started selling Denza vehicles in Thailand since November 2024. BYD's Thailand plant started exporting the BYD Dolphin to Europe in August 2025, in a bid to avoid import tariffs imposed to electric vehicles manufactured in China.

===== Indonesia =====
BYD introduced its passenger electric cars in Indonesia in January 2024. In April 2024, BYD announced that its Indonesian manufacturing plant would be located in Subang, West Java. The plant, in the Subang Smartpolitan Industrial Park, was inaugurated on 3 September 2026. It has an annual capacity of 150,000 units and employed more than 5,000 local workers at the start of operations.

On 1 October 2026, BYD renamed its Denza brand to Danza in Indonesia due to a trademark dispute with a local company. On 14 October 2026, BYD launched its Flash Charging system in Indonesia, which delivers up to 1,500 kW through a single connector and can charge a battery from 10 to 70 percent in five minutes. 10 charging stations were initially opened at Danza dealerships, with a target of 100 facilities by the end of 2026.

===== Malaysia =====
BYD entered Malaysia in December 2022 by partnering with local company Sime Darby Motors as its distributor. In August 2025, BYD announced plans to establish a completely knocked down (CKD) assembly plant in Tanjong Malim, Perak, with an investment of approximately RM1.3 billion and an annual production capacity of 50,000 vehicles. The facility was intended to begin operations in the second half of 2026.

On 29 September 2025, Malaysia's Ministry of Investment, Trade and Industry (MITI) issued BYD a temporary manufacturing licence, and the Perak state government subsequently fast-tracked land clearance and construction permits. However, by March 2026, it was reported that BYD was reconsidering its plans after being unable to agree to conditions set by MITI, such as the stipulation that 80% of vehicles assembled at the plant would be required to be exported, and an initial localisation requirement of 40% for components sourced domestically. MITI additionally imposed a minimum domestic sale price of RM100,000 for locally assembled vehicles to preserve market space for national manufacturers Proton and Perodua. Construction at the Tanjong Malim site was subsequently halted, with the site reported to be inactive.

In September 2026, it was reported that BYD had dropped its plans to build its own plant in Tanjong Malim. On 15 October 2026, BYD Malaysia signed an agreement with Inokom, a subsidiary of Sime Darby Motors, appointing the company as its completely knocked down (CKD) assembly partner, with vehicles to be assembled at Inokom's existing plant in Kulim, Kedah.

===== Singapore =====
BYD entered Singapore in 2014, initially supplying commercial electric vehicles including buses, light cargo vans, and trucks. From 2019, the company expanded into the passenger car segment, partnering with Vantage Automotive Limited (VAL) as its authorised passenger car distributor, while commercial vehicle distribution was handled separately by ST Engineering and Inchcape.

BYD's passenger car sales grew substantially from 2022 onwards. In 2023, BYD registered 1,416 units in Singapore, entering the top 10 best-selling car brands for the first time. In 2024, registrations rose to 6,191 units through authorised dealers, giving BYD a 14.4% market share and displacing long-time market leader Toyota. For the full year 2025, BYD registered 11,184 units in Singapore, representing 21.2% of all new car registrations, retaining its position as the top-selling brand in the country for the second consecutive year.

===== Philippines =====
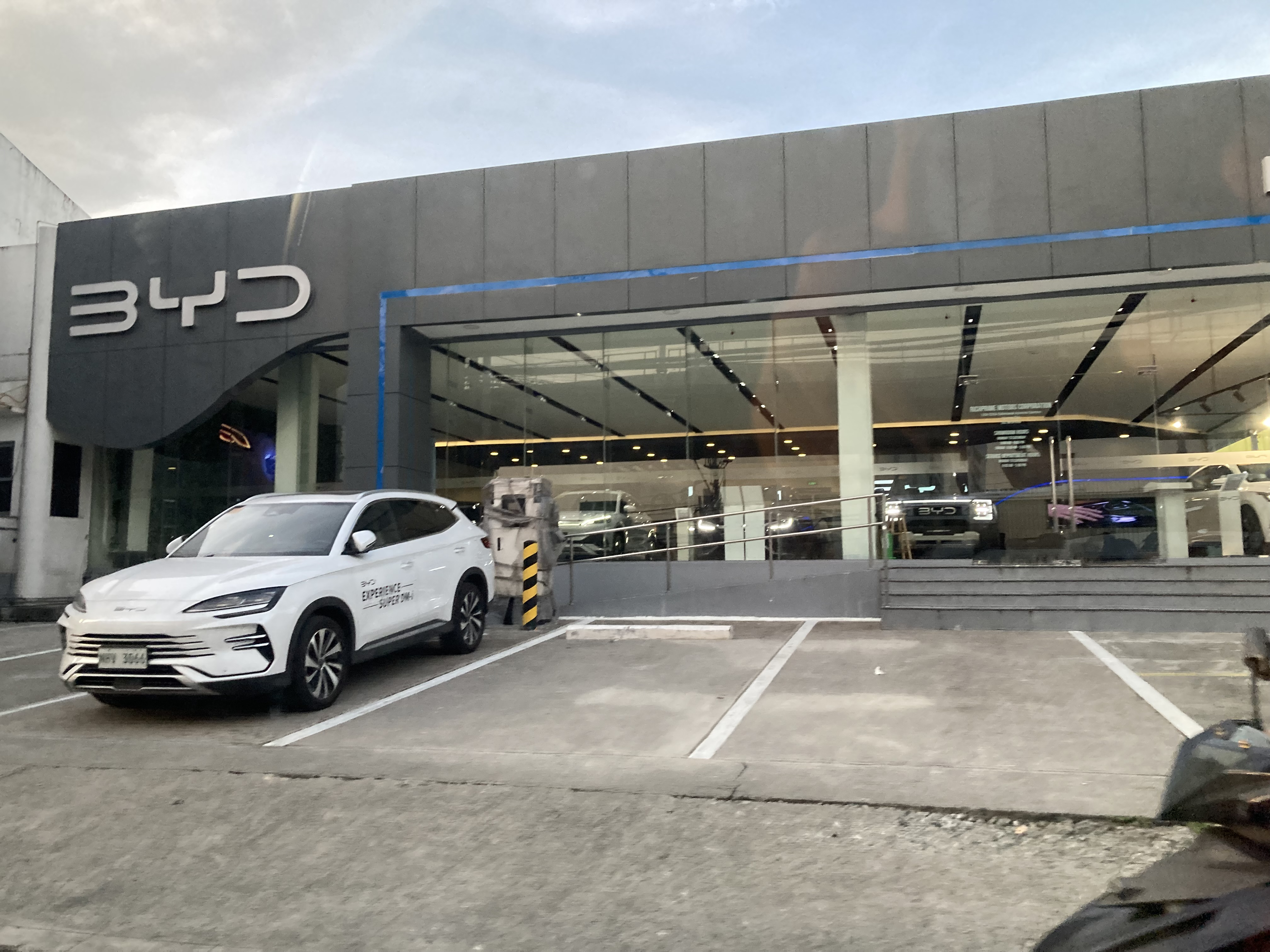
A BYD dealership in Quezon City, Philippines

In the Philippines, BYD partnered with Ayala Corporation to distribute BYD passenger electric cars in the country since August 2023.

==== India ====
BYD entered the Indian automotive sector in 2016 as a battery and bus chassis supplier to Olectra Greenwich Ltd. Its manufacturing operations are based in the Sriperumbudur plant, Tamil Nadu. BYD started assembling electric passenger vehicles through a semi-knock down arrangement in low volume in 2022. The models assembled are the fleet-oriented e6 since September 2022 and the Atto 3 since November 2022.

In July 2023, investment plans to produce cars in India were cancelled due to scrutiny from the Indian government, citing security concerns. BYD Auto had previously planned to invest US$1 billion with a local joint venture partner, Megha Engineering, with production targeted to begin in 2025.

==== Bangladesh ====
BYD entered the Bangladeshi market in partnership with CG Runners by debuting their BYD Seal in March 2024. Since then, they've been launching more car models such as the Atto 3.

In March 2026, Runners Automobile PLC, in a disclosure to the Dhaka Stock Exchange, revealed that the company signed a deal with BYD to manufacture BYD EVs in Bangladesh at Bhaluka, Mymensingh District.

==== Pakistan ====
BYD entered the Pakistani automotive market in August 2024 with the launch of the Atto 3, Seal, and Sealion 6 models. In addition, BYD has announced plans to establish a car production plant in Port Qasim, Karachi under a joint venture with Mega Motors, a subsidiary of Hub Power Company, Pakistan's largest independent power producer. The facility is projected to be completed in the first half of 2026.

==== Uzbekistan ====
BYD entered Uzbekistan in March 2023 by introducing two plug-in hybrid models and one battery electric model. The company established a joint venture with the local company Uzavtosanoat JSC (UzAuto) to assemble plug-in hybrid cars starting in 2024. The plant is located in Jizzakh. The first vehicle produced by the facility, a BYD Song Plus DM-i, rolled off the assembly line on 27 June 2024.

=== Europe ===
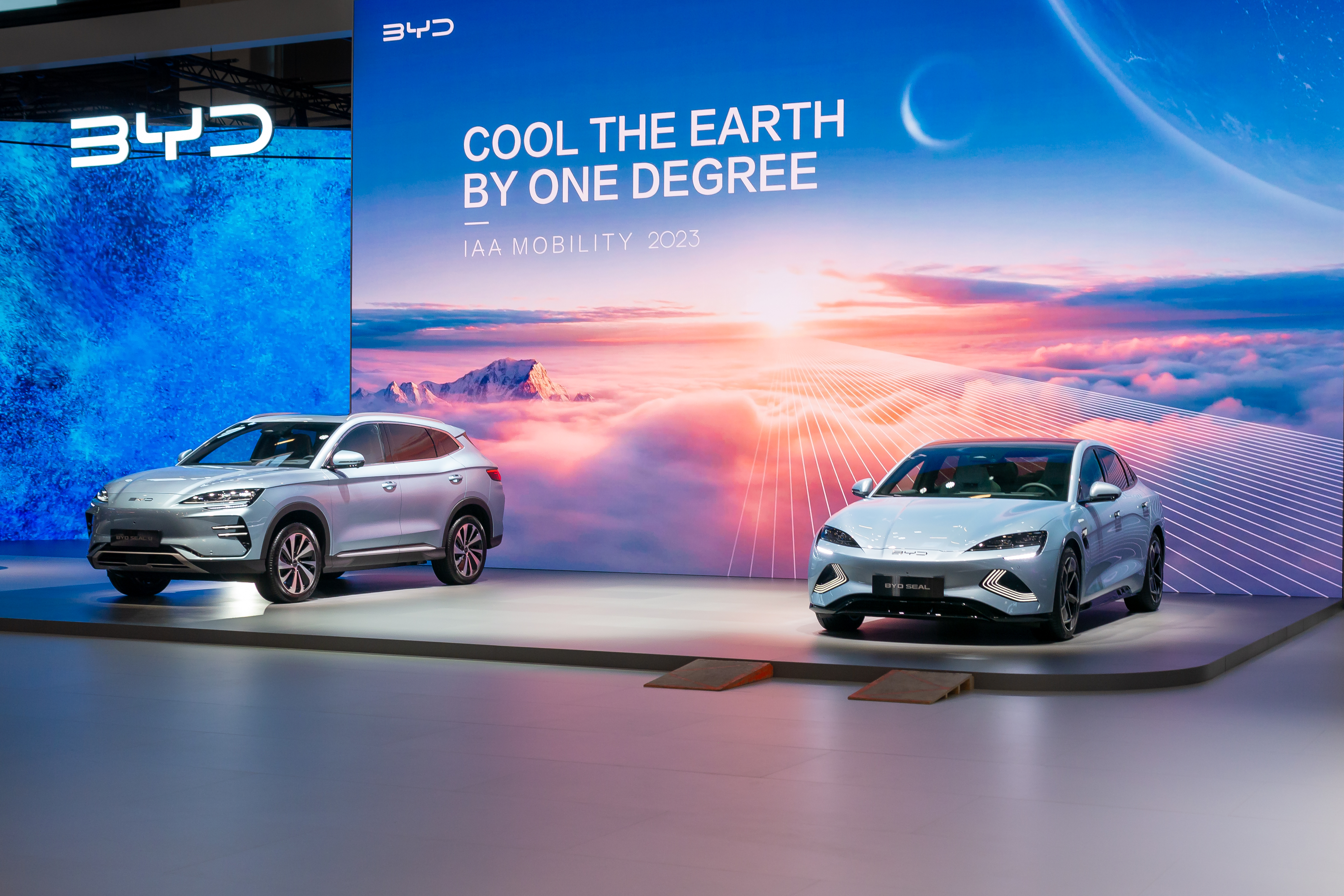
BYD booth at the IAA Summit 2023, Munich, Germany

BYD has produced electric buses in Europe since 2017 at its plant in Komárom, Hungary, and introduced its eTruck range there in 2021. As of June 2025, its electric buses operated in more than 160 European cities across 26 countries, and BYD began expanding the Komárom plant to raise its annual capacity to more than 1,000 buses and trucks.

In May 2020, BYD Auto announced that it would offer passenger vehicles in Europe, starting with Norway. The company chose Norway due to the widespread adoption of electric vehicles in the country. The first product offered there is the BYD Tang. Previous BYD vehicles offered in Europe are mainly commercial vehicles and fleet-oriented vehicles such as the BYD e6, sold in low volumes.

In 2022, BYD Auto began selling its passenger vehicles in more European countries, such as Denmark, Sweden, the Netherlands, Germany, France, and Belgium. In Germany and Sweden, the BYD models are sold in cooperation with the Hedin Group. In October 2022, BYD appointed Denzel Group as its distributor in Austria. In March 2023, BYD entered the United Kingdom market by introducing the Atto 3. In June 2024, BYD began selling three BEV passenger car models in Poland.

BYD built its first European passenger car factory in Szeged, Hungary, which will build new energy vehicles with an annual capacity of over 100,000 vehicles in 2026. The plan was first announced in December 2023. It is the first Chinese manufacturer to plan a European factory.

In September 2023, the European Commission announced EU would launch an anti-subsidy investigation into Chinese electric vehicle manufacturers, including BYD. European Commission president Ursula von der Leyen claimed that Chinese electric vehicle prices are kept artificially low by significant state subsidies, that would in effect distort the EU market. BYD Europe managing director, Michael Shu, argued that BYD's competitive price was achieved by higher "management efficiency" and "unique technology" instead of subsidies from the Chinese government. In June 2024, the European Commission completed its investigation, and imposed an additional 17.4% import duty on top of the existing 15% on BYD vehicles imported into the European Union, effective 4 July 2024.

BYD vehicles generate significantly higher profitability in Europe than in China, driven by their higher pricing in the European market. Research by the Rhodium Group shows that BYD sells their vehicles in Europe with a 92–112% markup compared to its price in China. As the result, BYD makes approximately €14,300 in profit on each Seal U EV model sold in the EU, which is an 11-fold increase compared to the €1,300 profit on the same model sold in China. Reuters noted that the BYD Atto 3 is priced at US$19,283 in China and US$42,789 in Germany. Despite the higher price in Germany, it remains competitive with similar electric vehicles there. The price difference can be attributed to the more competitive market conditions in China, while in Europe, BYD is able to position its vehicles at a higher price point. This indicates that despite the tariffs imposed by the EU, BYD is likely able to continue create profit in Europe.

On 8 April 2026, BYD launched the Denza brand in Europe at an event in Paris, with the Denza Z9 GT shooting brake and the Denza D9 minivan as its first models. The Z9 GT is the first model in Europe to use the second-generation Blade Battery and BYD's Flash Charging system. Denza plans to be present in more than 30 European countries by the end of 2026. BYD opened its first European Flash Charging station in Germany in mid-2026 and has set a target of 3,000 stations across the continent by 2027.

==== Turkey ====
BYD announced plans to invest $1 billion in a factory in Manisa, Turkey, which is part of a customs union with the European Union. The factory was to have an annual production capacity of 150,000 vehicles and begin operating by the end of 2026. An agreement between BYD CEO Wang Chuanfu and Turkey's Industry and Technology Minister Mehmet Fatih Kacır was signed on 8 July 2024. Construction had not begun by mid-2026, and the ministry suspended BYD's access to incentives at the beginning of the year because of the lack of progress.

In June 2026, BYD executive vice president Stella Li said the project had been put on hold with no timeline to proceed. She said the company's priority was its plant in Szeged, Hungary, followed by finding a second production site in Europe. The Turkish ministry stated that the investment agreement remains valid.

=== North America ===
==== United States ====
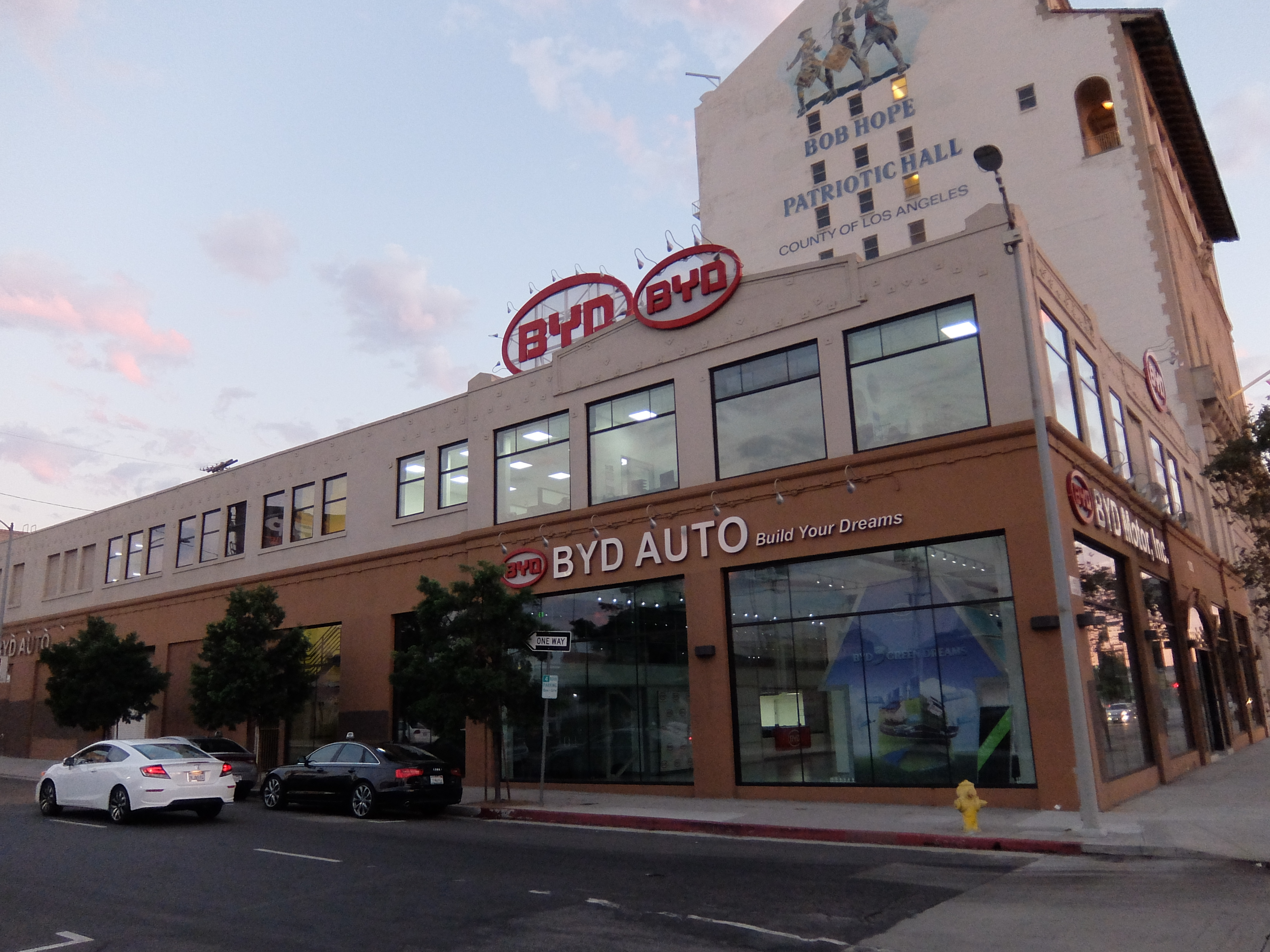
BYD Auto former US headquarters in Los Angeles, California in 2015

BYD's North American headquarters were opened in Los Angeles in 2011. The electric bus plant in Lancaster, California became operational in 2014. BYD first supplied the Los Angeles Metro Bus system with buses in 2015. This unit was spun off as RIDE Mobility in 2023.

In a February 2024 interview with Yahoo! Finance, Stella Li, the executive vice president of BYD and CEO of BYD Americas iterated that BYD is "not planning to come to the US" to sell electric passenger cars, despite planning a manufacturing plant in Mexico, citing politically motivated trade barriers against Chinese companies and the slowing rate of growth for electric car adoption in the US. BYD is one of the top electric bus manufacturers in North America, and has been primarily adopted by the metro transit authorities of Los Angeles and San Francisco.

==== Mexico ====
BYD started selling electric passenger cars in Mexico since 2023. The first models introduced were the Han EV sedan, Tang EV and Yuan Plus EV. Previously the company has presence in the country selling battery electric buses, trucks and taxis. Reports in February 2024 indicated that BYD is planning to build a manufacturing plant in Mexico. According to Stella Li, the company is not considering any northern state as it targets the local market instead of the US market.

==== Canada ====
BYD is expanding into the Canadian market under a trade agreement that replaced its initial 100% tariff on Chinese-built vehicles with an annual quota of 49,000 Chinese-made EVs. Following the reduction of Canadian tariffs on Chinese vehicles, BYD plans to open 20 dealerships in Canada starting in 2027, targeting metropolitan markets such as Toronto, Montreal, Vancouver, and Calgary.

=== Oceania ===
==== Australia ====
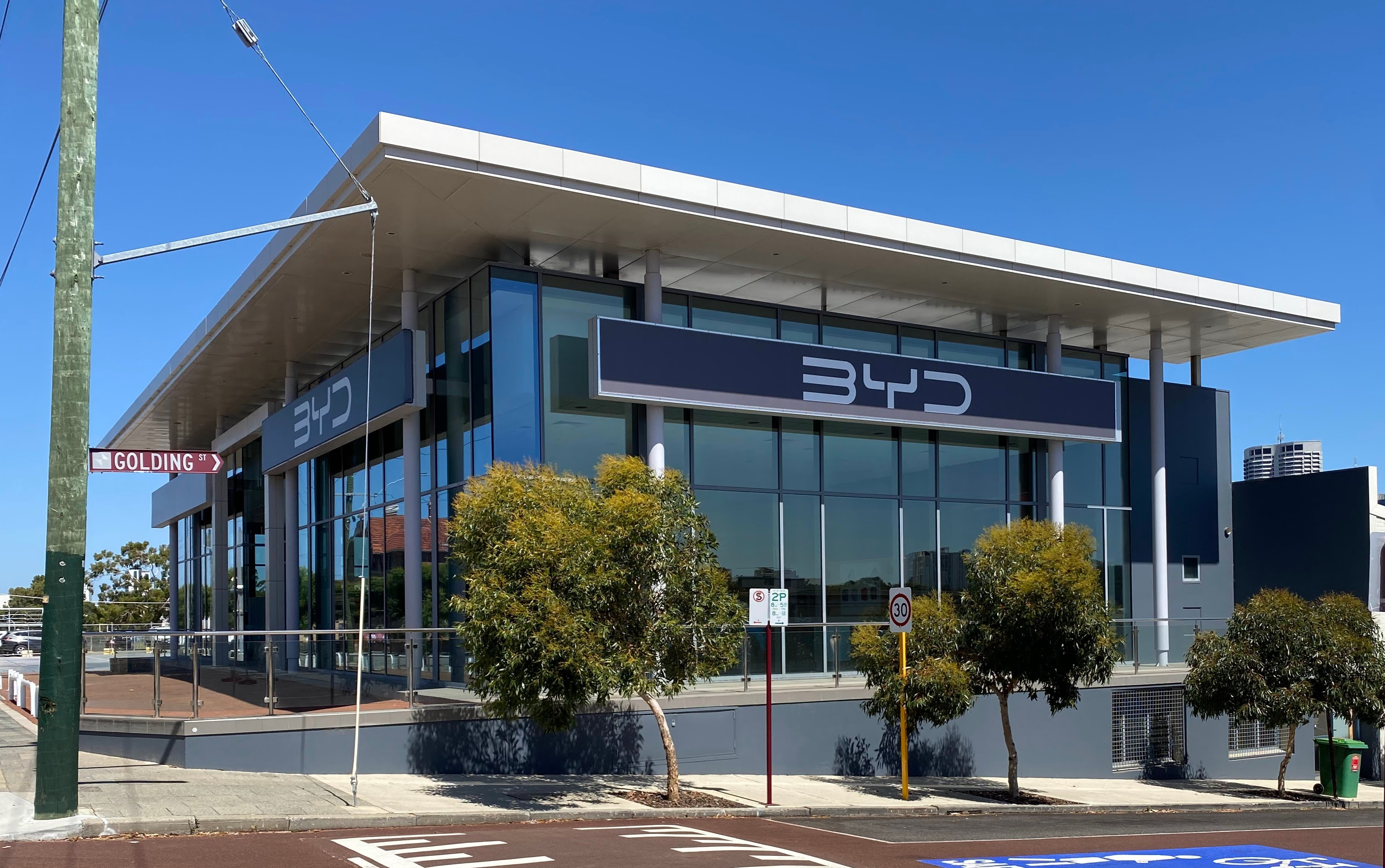
A BYD dealership in Perth, Western Australia

BYD entered the Australian market in 2022 through a partnership with EVDirect, a local distributor that is a subsidiary of ASX-listed company MotorCycle Holdings. Both companies signed an agreement in February 2021. The company showcased the first right-hand drive Atto 3 in August 2022. Its entry into the Australian market was delayed by a month to November 2022 due to compliance issues with the Atto 3, due to the top tether child restraint anchor point in the center rear seating position not being in compliance with the Australian Design Rules. Despite the delay, the Atto 3 became the second-best-selling electric vehicle in Australia in 2022, behind only the Tesla Model 3. In 2023, BYD introduced two more models (the Dolphin and the Seal) in Australia, and by the end of the year has sold 12,438 vehicles, making it the second-largest electric vehicle brand in the country. In 2024, the brand introduced two plug-in hybrid vehicles in the country, starting with the Sealion 6 in May, and the Shark 6 in October.

In May 2025, BYD announced that it will assume direct control of its operations in Australia beginning July 2025, ending EVDirect's role as the brand's local distributor. EVDirect will retain involvement with BYD through a minority shareholding in EVDealer Group, a retail joint venture with Eagers Automotive. The arrangement maintains the current retail and service network, and enables Eagers Automotive to expand BYD's retail presence in Australia.

=== Central and South America ===
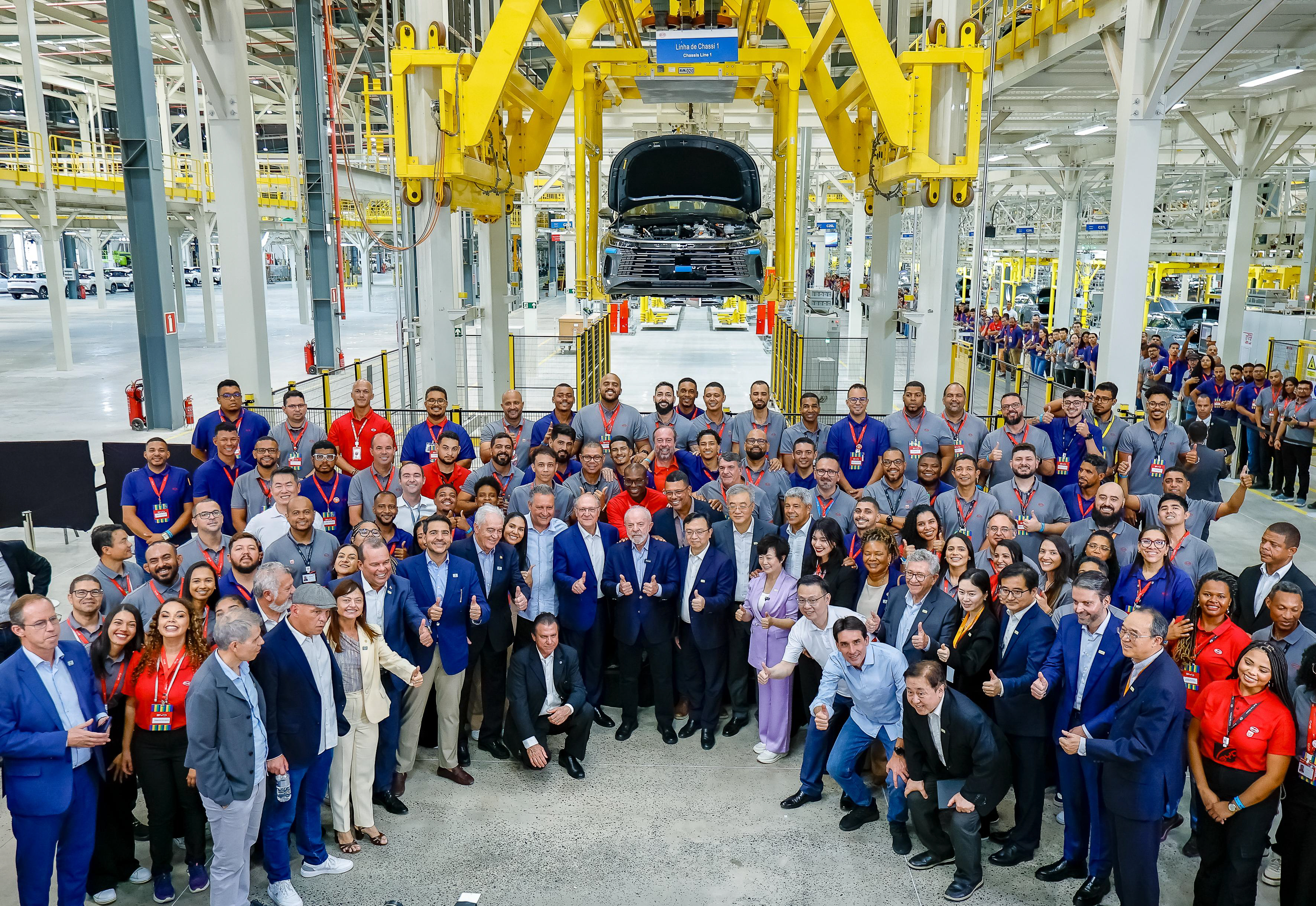
BYD’s Camaçari factory during an official visit attended by Brazil's President Luiz Inácio Lula da Silva, BYD chairman Wang Chuanfu, and BYD vice president Stella Li, October 2025

BYD planned to deliver 1,002 electric buses to Bogotá, the capital city of Colombia, by mid-2022, after winning a contract for 406 electric buses in January 2021.

In 2022, BYD began selling passenger vehicles in Colombia and Costa Rica.

BYD began operations in El Salvador in September 2024 through a partnership with Energy Motors, launching its first showroom in San Salvador at Centro Comercial Galerías. The company introduced a lineup of electric and plug-in hybrid vehicles, with plans to expand to San Miguel and Santa Ana in 2025.

==== Brazil ====
In February 2022, BYD Auto began sales of passenger vehicles in Brazil starting with the Tang EV (marketed as the Tan), followed by the Han EV in April 2022. Previously, BYD in Brazil had marketed battery electric buses and commercial vehicles.

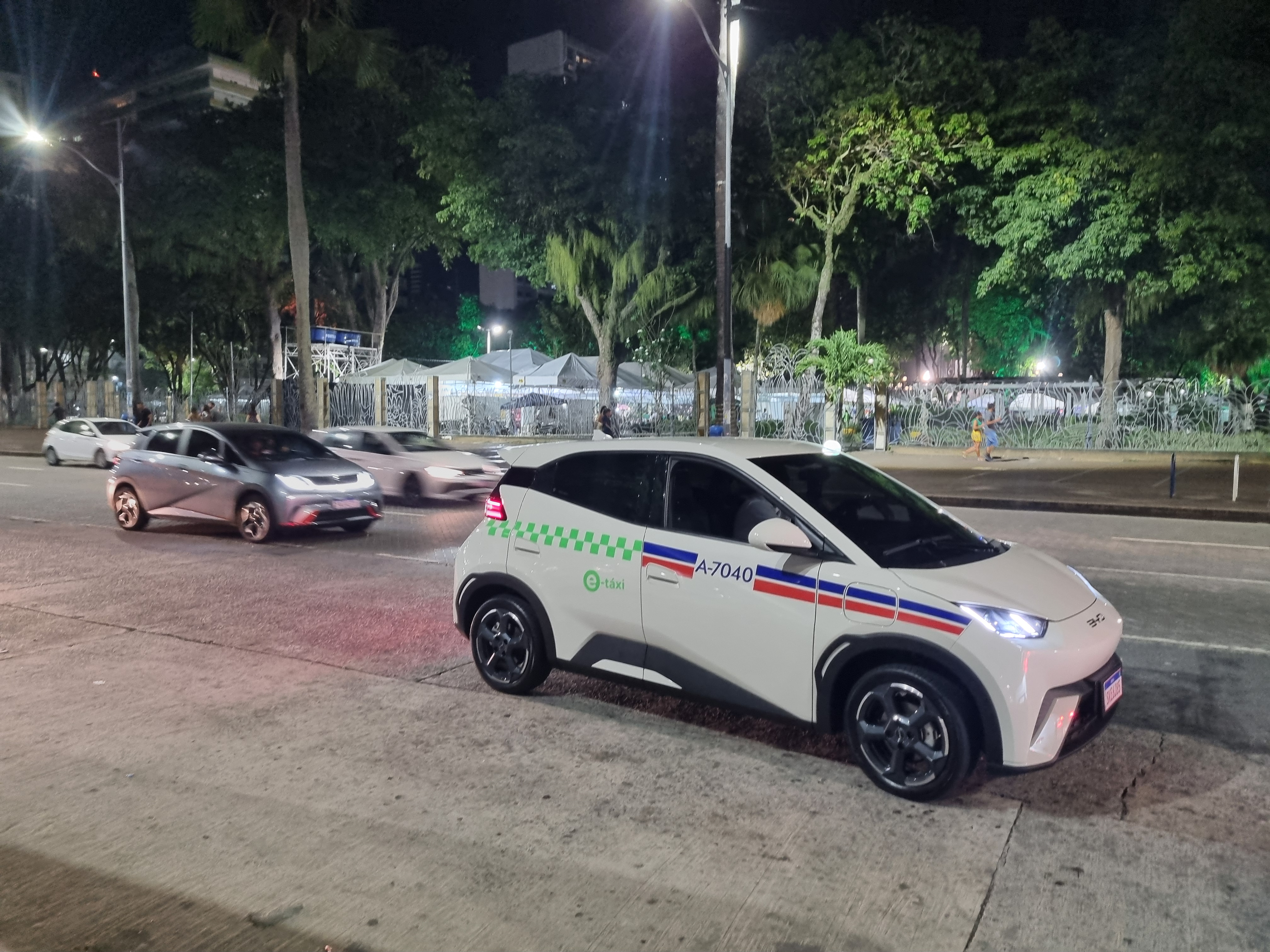
BYD Dolphin taxi in Salvador, Brazil.

In July 2023, BYD announced an investment of US$600 million in Brazil to acquire, modernise, and increase the production capacity of a former Ford manufacturing plant in Camaçari, Bahia, to build up to 300,000 cars per year by 2025. The plant will produce the Dolphin, Yuan Plus, and Song Plus DM-i. The construction of this factory was however stopped before Christmas 2024 as the Brazilian Ministry of Work accused the construction company to flout labour laws and hold their workers in "slavery-like conditions".

BYD also plans to build two industrial plants: one for the production of electric bus/truck platforms and another for refining lithium and iron phosphate ores for use in BYD's battery factories in China. In June 2024, BYD announced its goal to sell 350,000 vehicles annually in Brazil by 2028 and to become one of the top three car brands in the country.

== Products ==
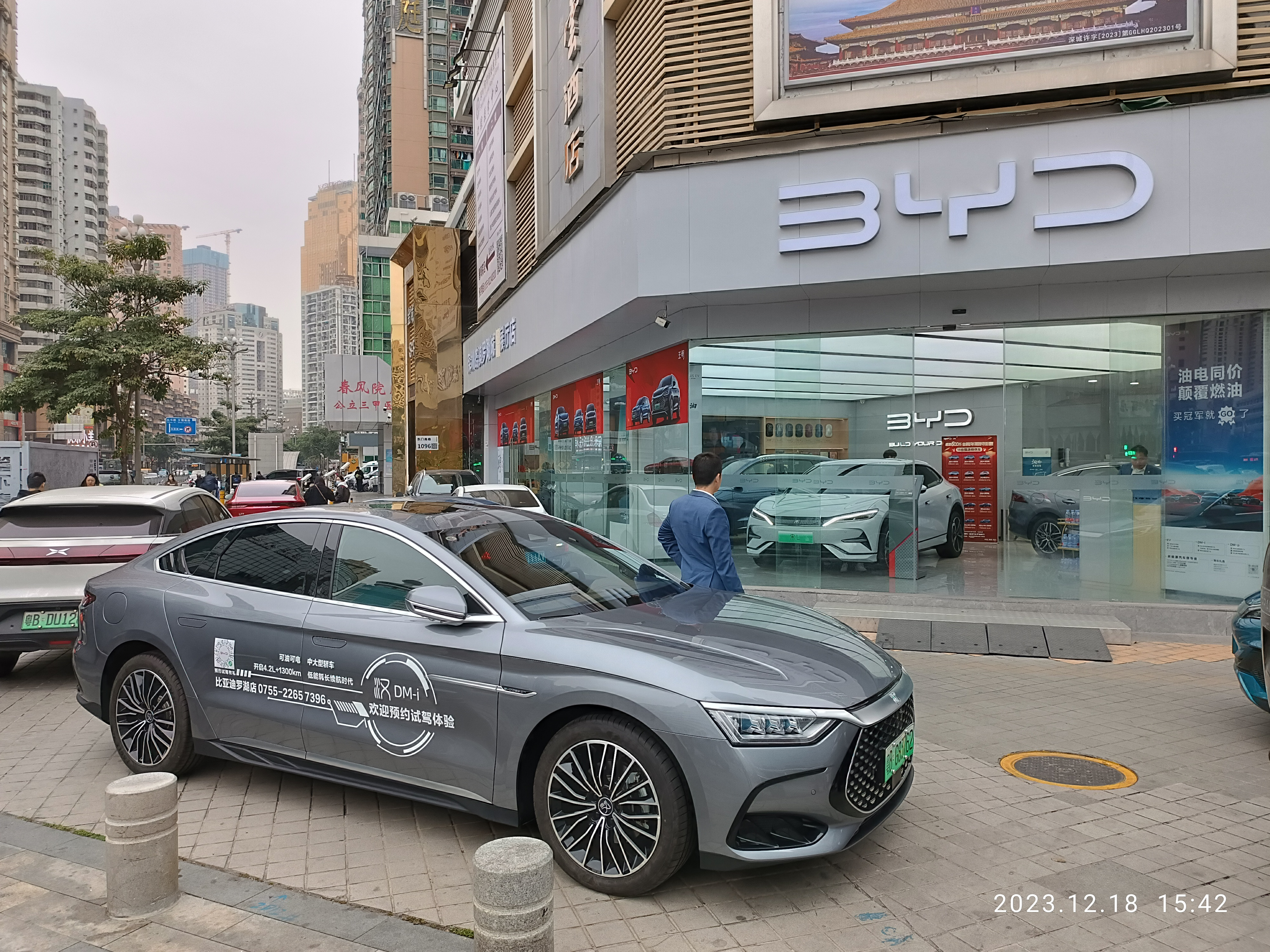
A BYD Dynasty Network showroom in Shenzhen

BYD Auto offers a broad variety of vehicle types, including sedans, hatchbacks, MPVs and SUVs across four different brands. It also produces commercial vehicles such as battery electric buses and coaches in various sizes, and large trucks. The company formerly produced internal combustion engine (ICE) vehicles until 2022, when the carmaker announced that it would focus on new energy vehicles.

=== Passenger vehicles ===
Best-selling BYD models, 2025
Rank	Model	Global sales
1	BYD Seagull; Dolphin Mini, Surf; Atto 1	529,537
2	BYD Song Plus; Seal U; Sealion 6	400,920
3	BYD Qin Plus	366,090
4	BYD Yuan Up, Pro; Atto 2	267,179
5	BYD Dolphin	239,312
6	BYD Song Pro; Sealion 5	232,548
7	BYD Qin L DM-i	174,634
8	BYD Sealion 06	166,833
9	BYD Seal 06 DM-i	164,846
10	BYD Yuan Plus; Atto 3	163,556

For passenger vehicles for personal use, the BYD brand distinguishes its line-up under three main series: the Dynasty Series (started by the Qin in 2012), Ocean Series (started by the Dolphin in 2021), and the e Series (started by the e6 in 2009). In China, these series are offered through separate dealership chains, namely the Dynasty Network (Chinese: 王朝网; pinyin: Wángcháo Wǎng) and the Ocean Network (Chinese: 海洋网; pinyin: Hǎiyáng Wǎng) (formerly the e-Network in 2019–2021). e Series vehicles are distributed through the Ocean Network.

Dynasty Series vehicles are designed with dragon-inspired elements, and targets older customers. The nameplates used include Xia, Han, Tang, Qin, Song, and Yuan. Ocean Series vehicles are designed with a concept of "Ocean Aesthetics", using use of elements such as waves and flowing lines, and positioned to appeal to younger customers. Ocean Series vehicles predominantly uses marine animal names such as Seagull, Dolphin, Seal and Sealion, except two models that are named after warships (e.g. Frigate and Destroyer). BYD started phasing out the warship-named vehicles in 2025, merging both models into the Sealion and Seal nameplate instead. Fleet-oriented vehicles for ride-hailing and taxi use are categorised in the "e" series.

BYD passenger vehicles consist of battery electric vehicles, denoted by the EV moniker, and plug-in hybrids marketed as DM-i (Dual Mode Intelligent, a plug-in hybrid electric system) and DM-p (performance-oriented Dual Mode with all-wheel drive).

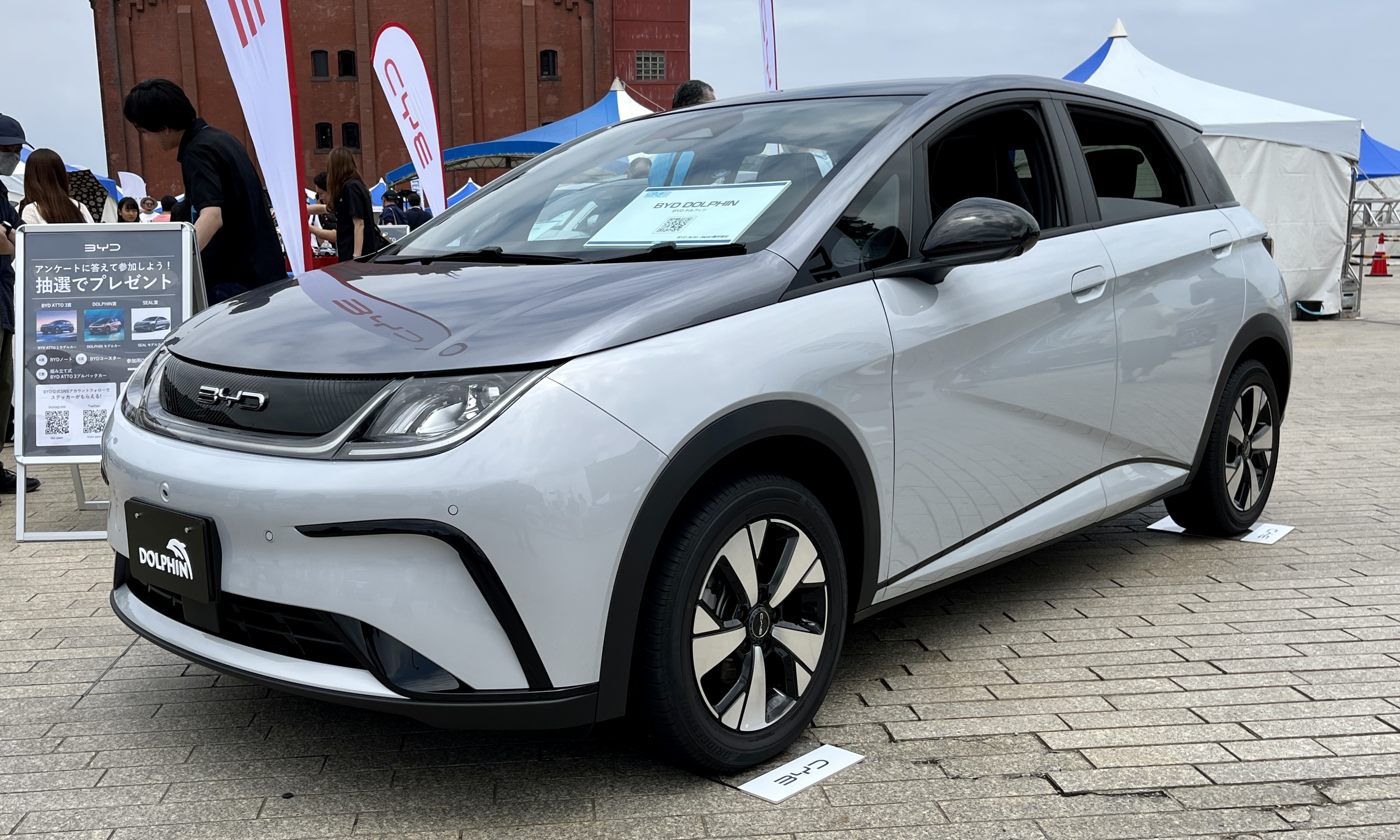
BYD Dolphin

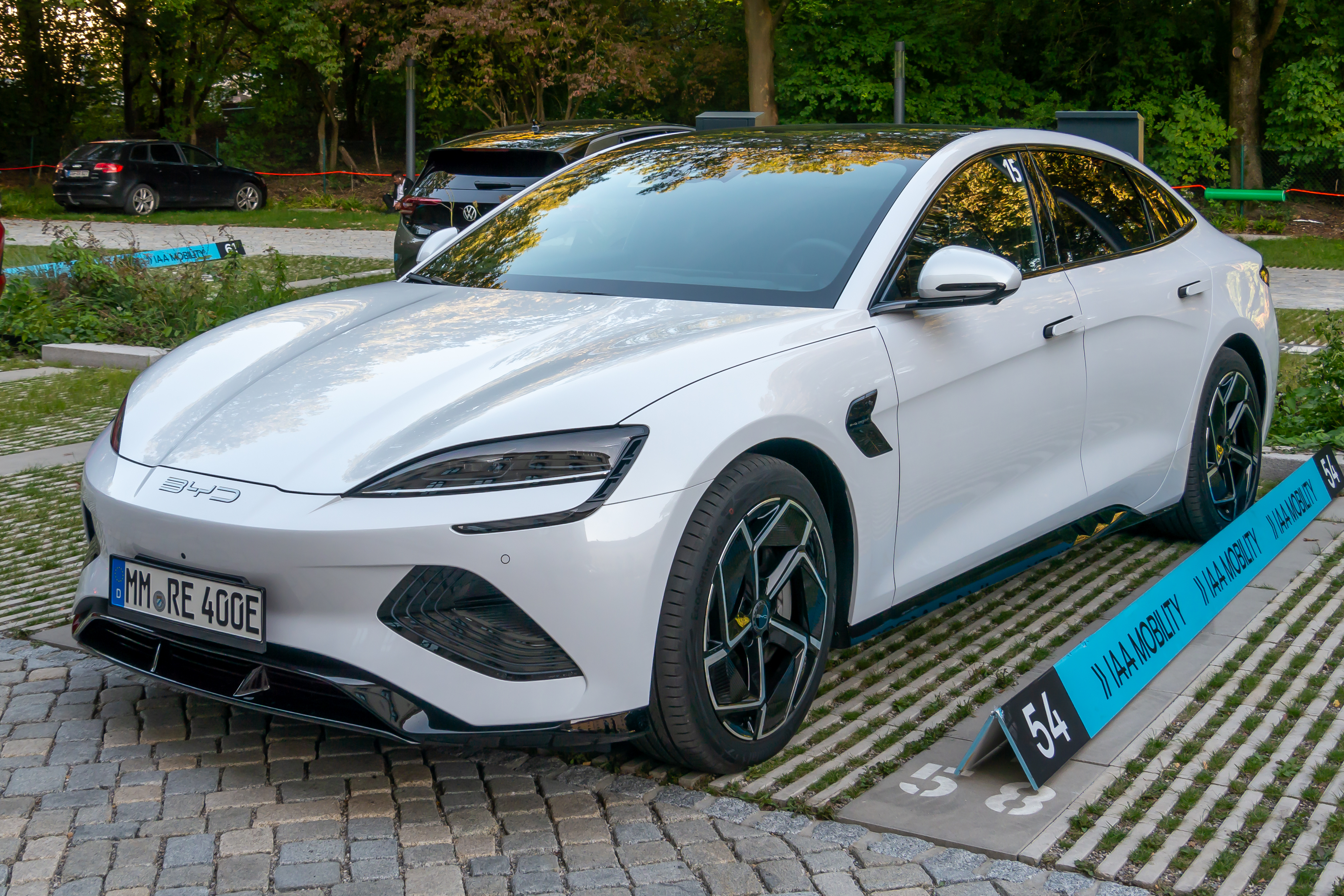
BYD Seal

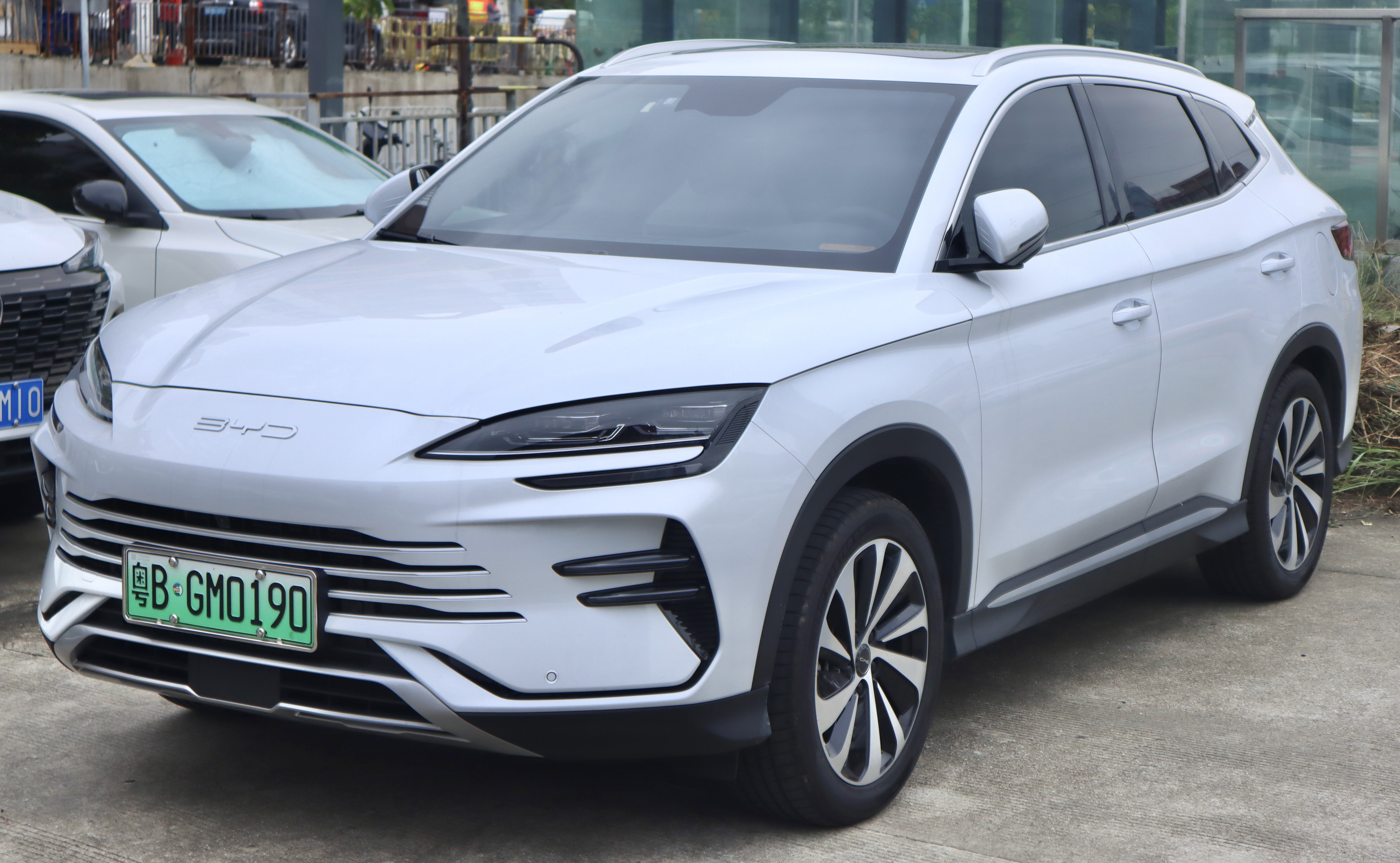
BYD Song Plus DM-i

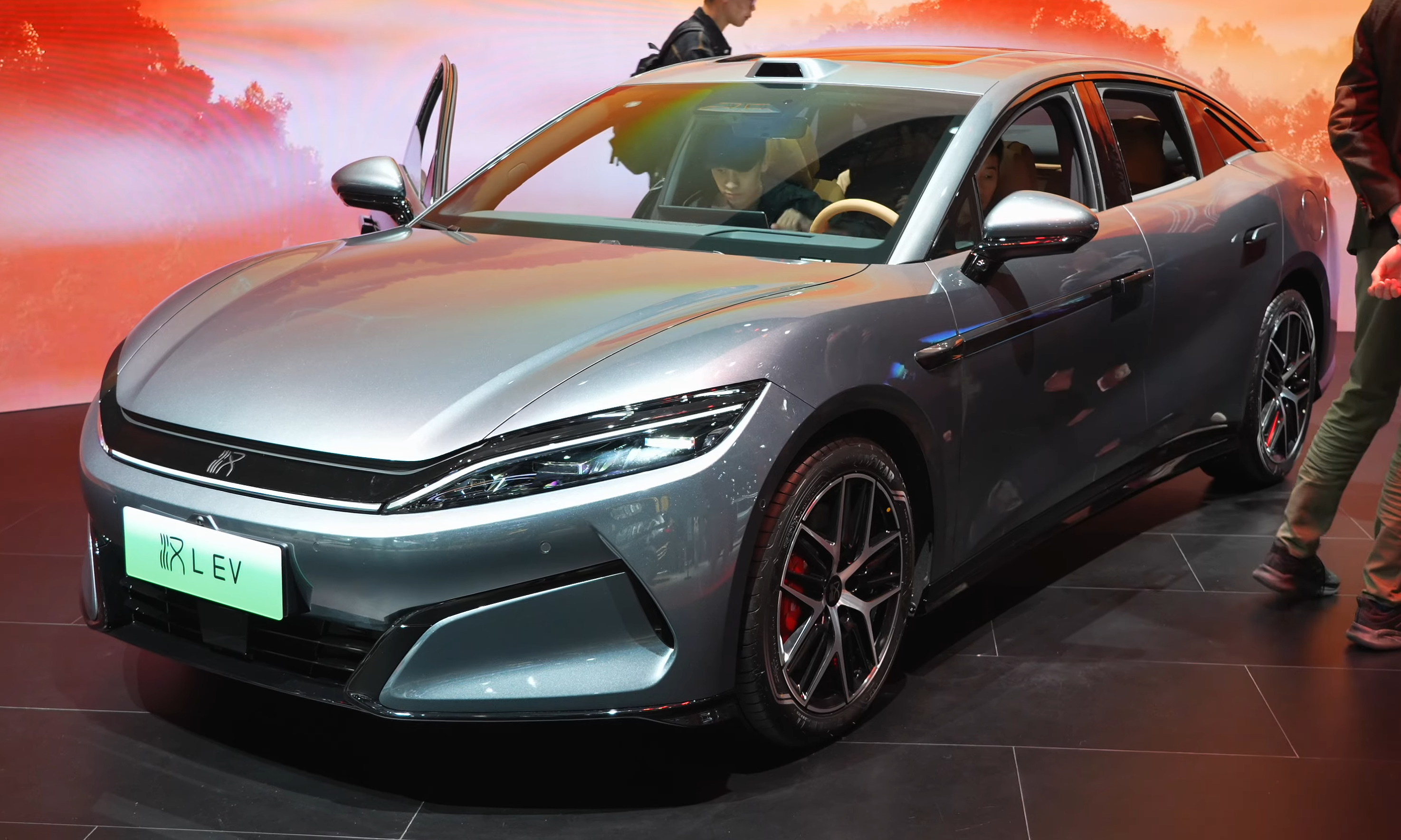
BYD Han L EV

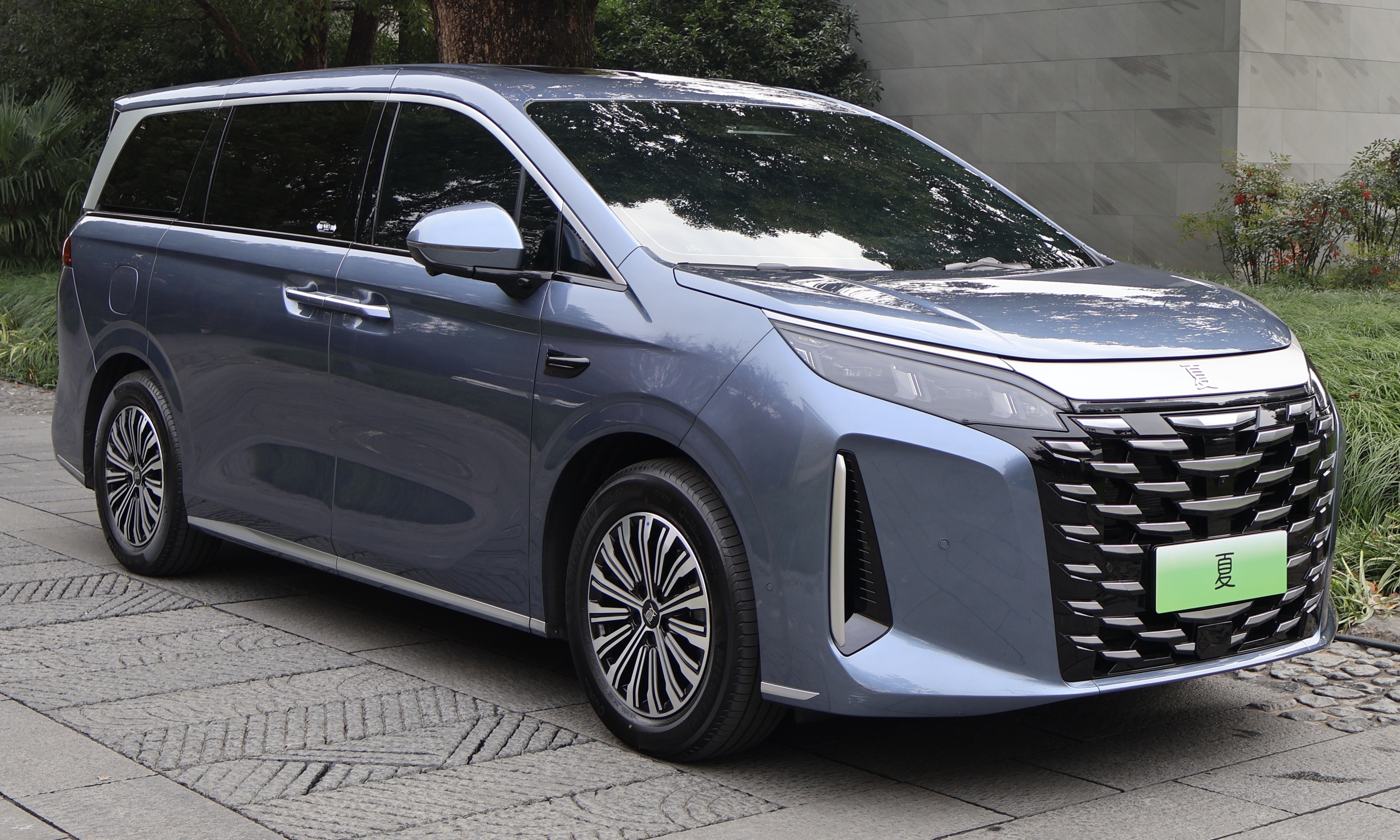
BYD Xia

==== Brands ====
===== Fangchengbao =====
Fangchengbao (Chinese: 方程豹; lit. 'formula leopard'), trademarked in English as Formula Bao is BYD Auto's brand that produces SUVs. BYD positioned the brand with "professional" and "personalised" vehicles, with products covering off-road and track-focused segments. The brand was announced on 9 June 2023.

On 16 August 2023, Fangchengbao released its first model, the Bao 5 plug-in hybrid SUV. It debuted at the Chengdu Auto Show and is based on a Fangchengbao-specific platform called DMO (Dual Mode Off-Road).

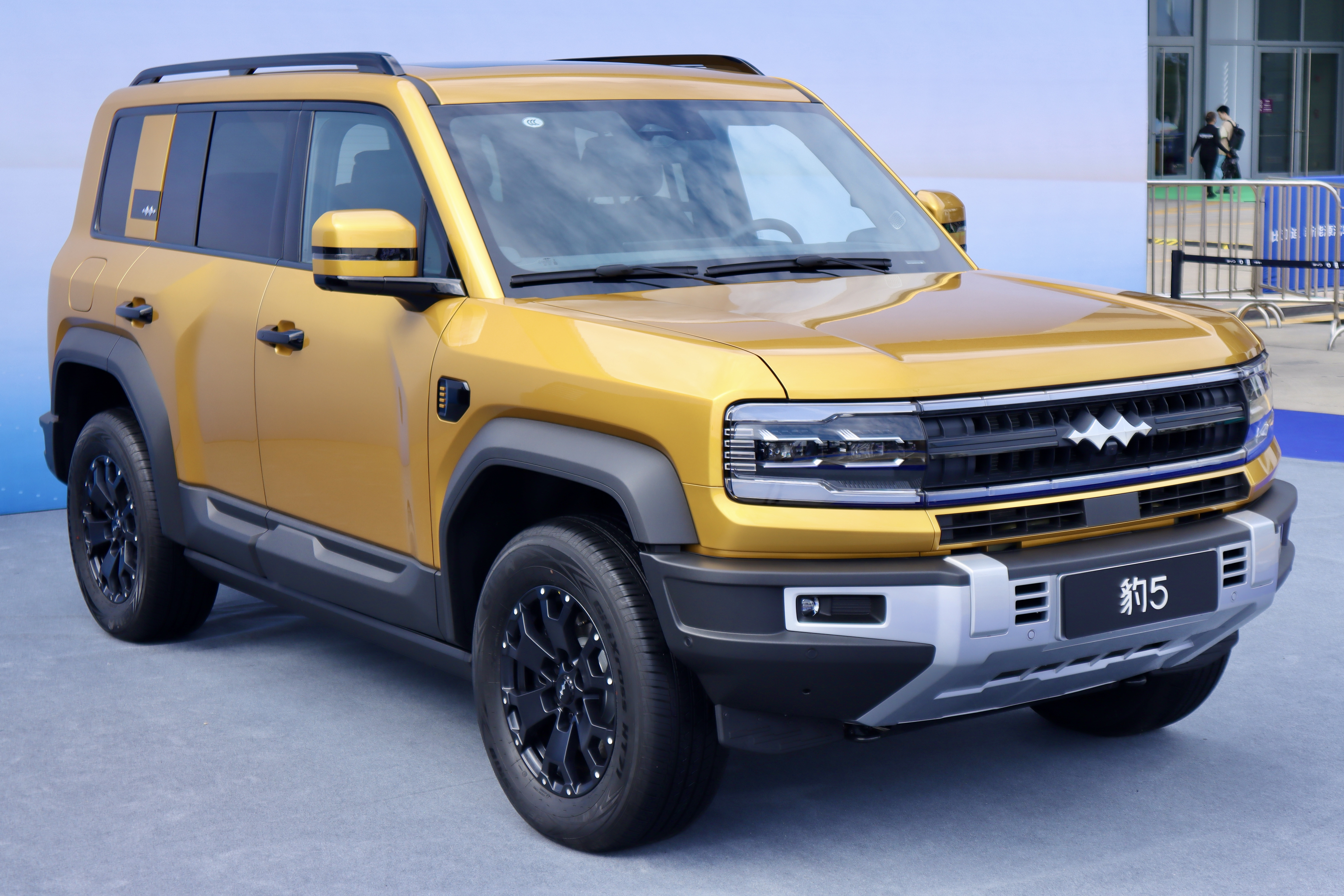
Fangchengbao Bao 5

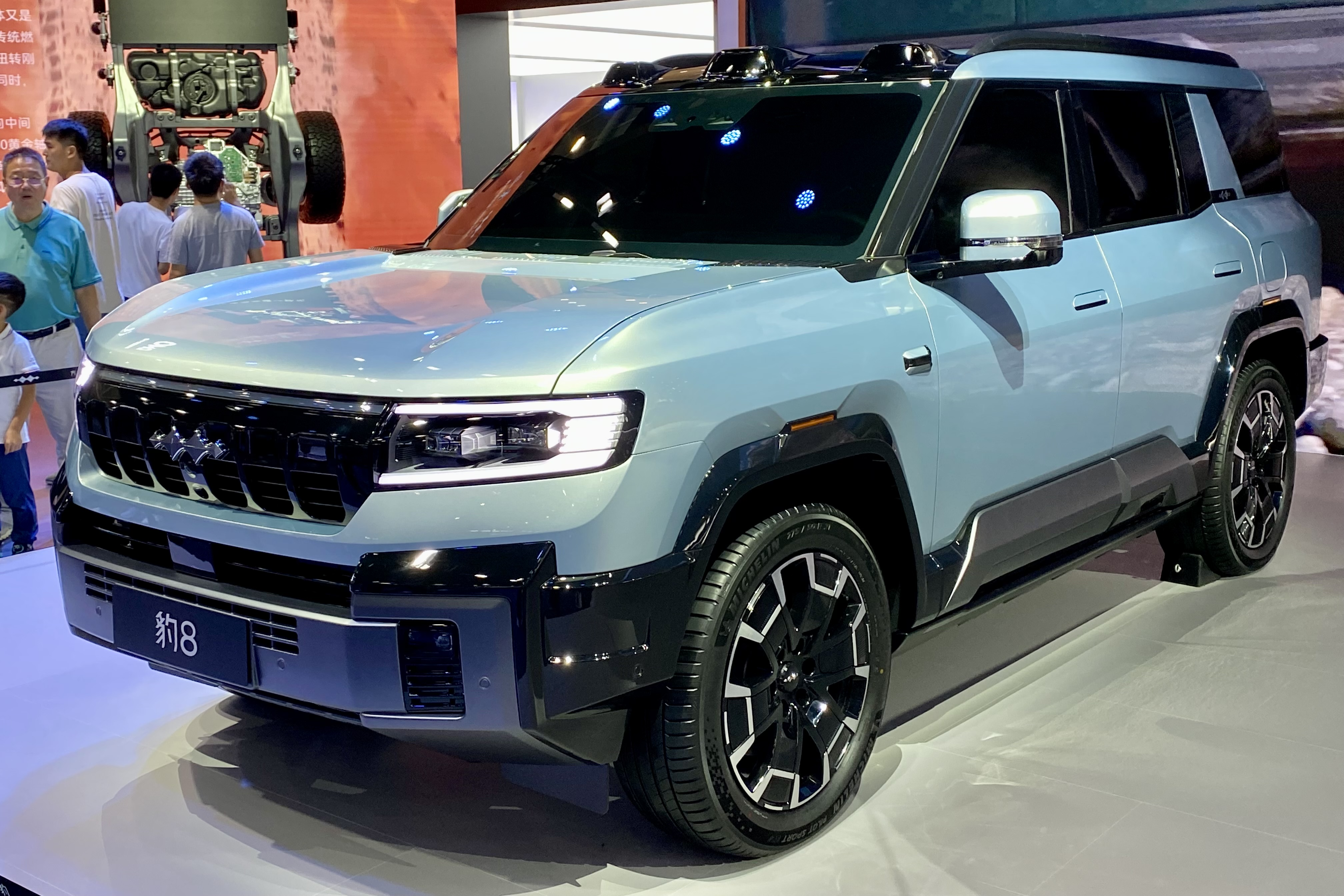
Fangchengbao Bao 8

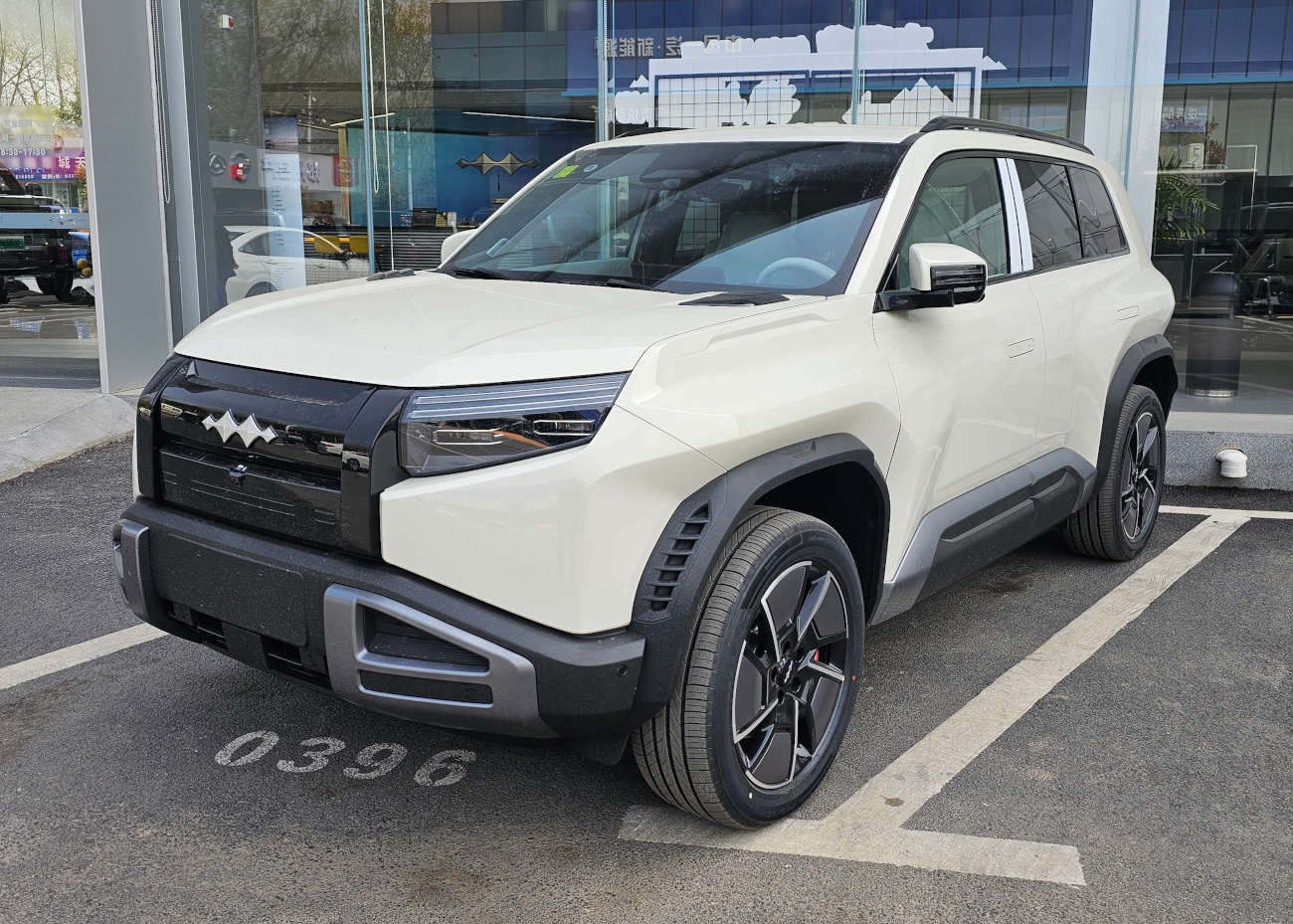
Fangchengbao Tai 3

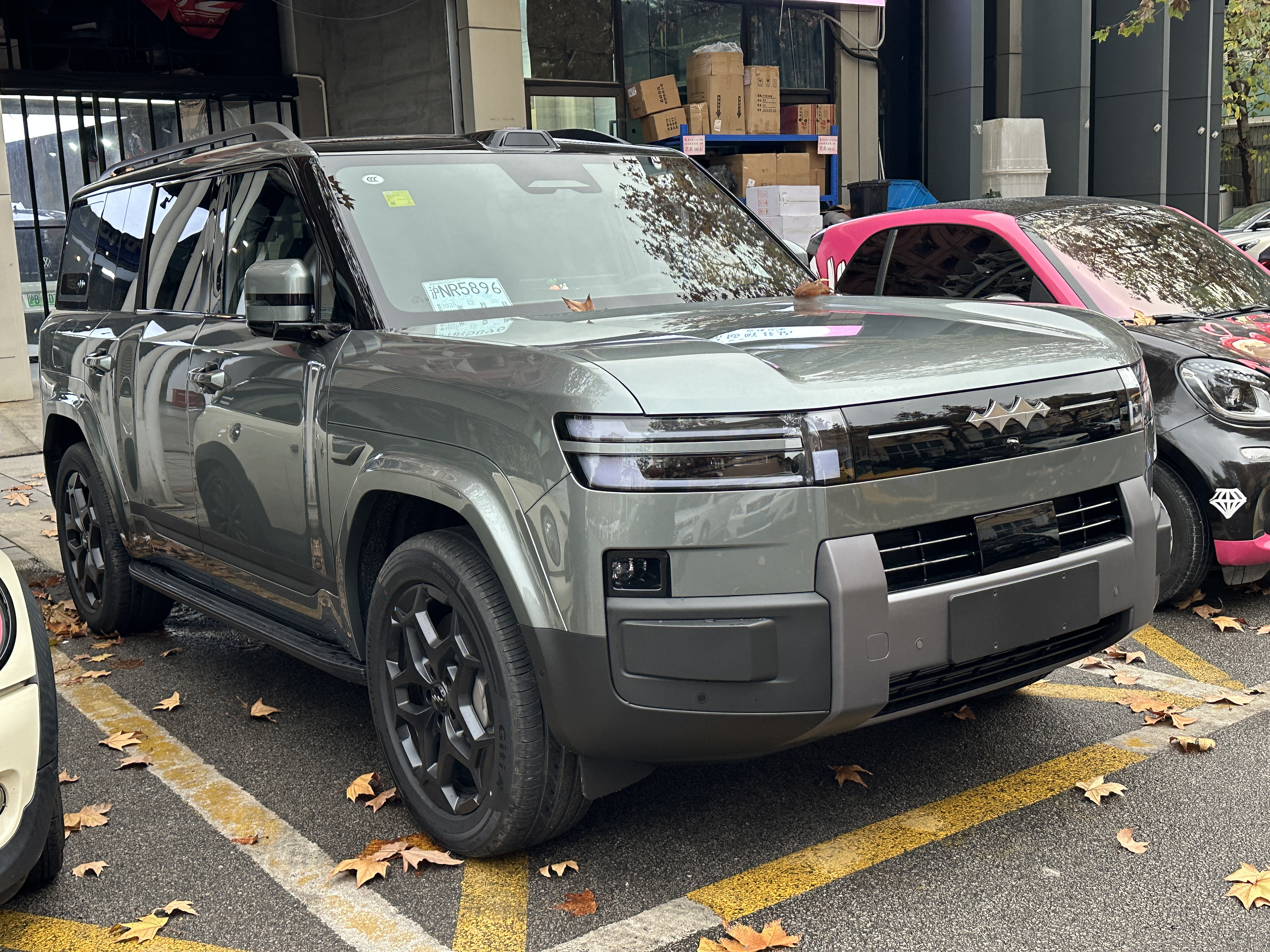
Fangchengbao Ti7

===== Denza =====
Denza (Chinese: 腾势; pinyin: Téngshì) is BYD's first luxury car brand. It was established in May 2010 as a joint venture with Mercedes-Benz Group (previously Daimler AG). Its first model, the Denza 500 is based on an earlier generation of the Mercedes-Benz B-Class. After years of low sales, in 2021 Daimler reduced its share from 50% to 10%, leaving BYD Auto Industry Co., Ltd. as the largest shareholder at 90%. The brand line-up was refreshed with the release of the Denza D9 minivan in 2022, followed by the Denza N7 SUV. In September 2024, Mercedes-Benz withdrew from the joint venture by transferring its remaining 10% stake to BYD, making Denza a wholly owned brand of BYD.

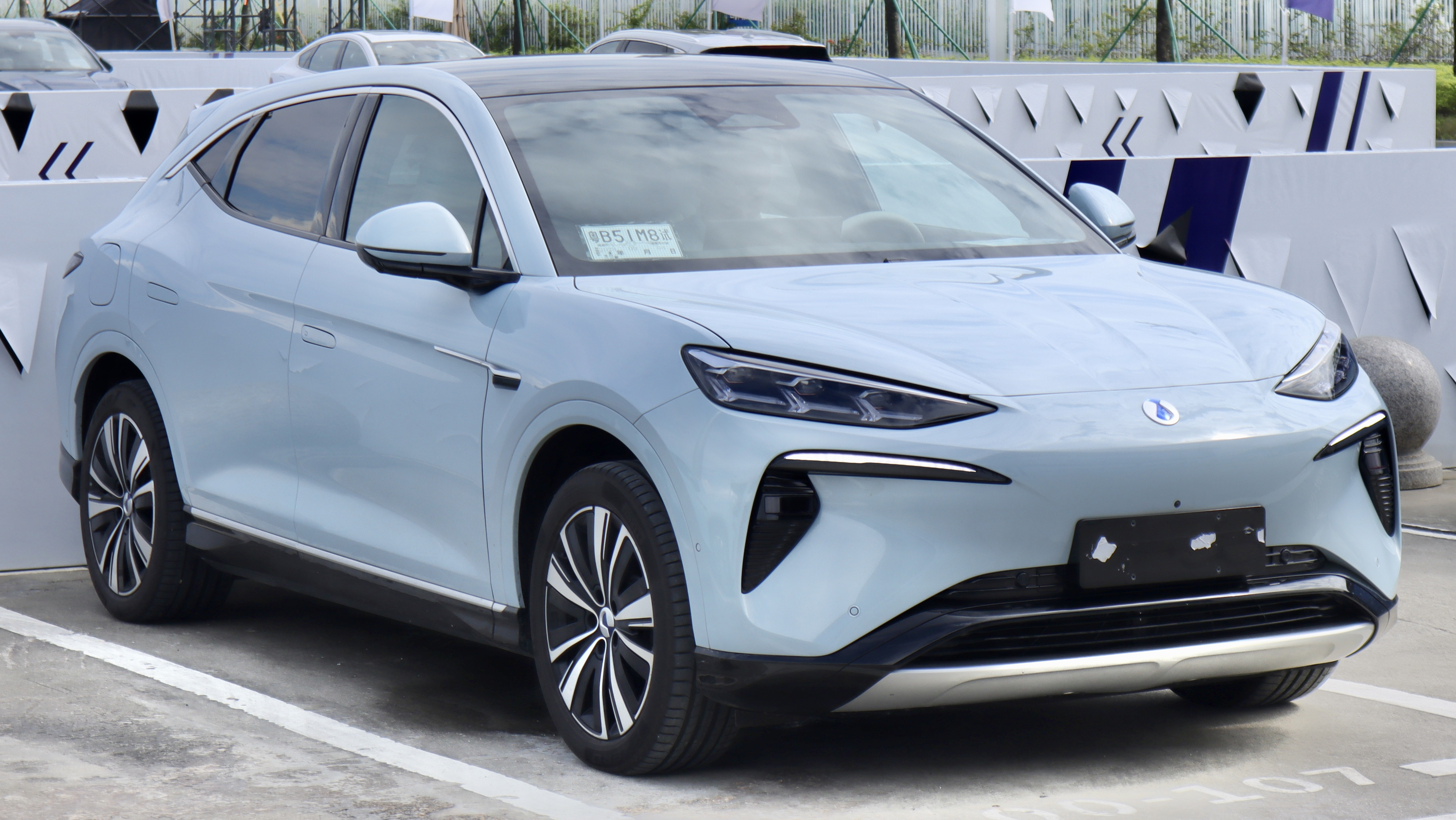
Denza N7

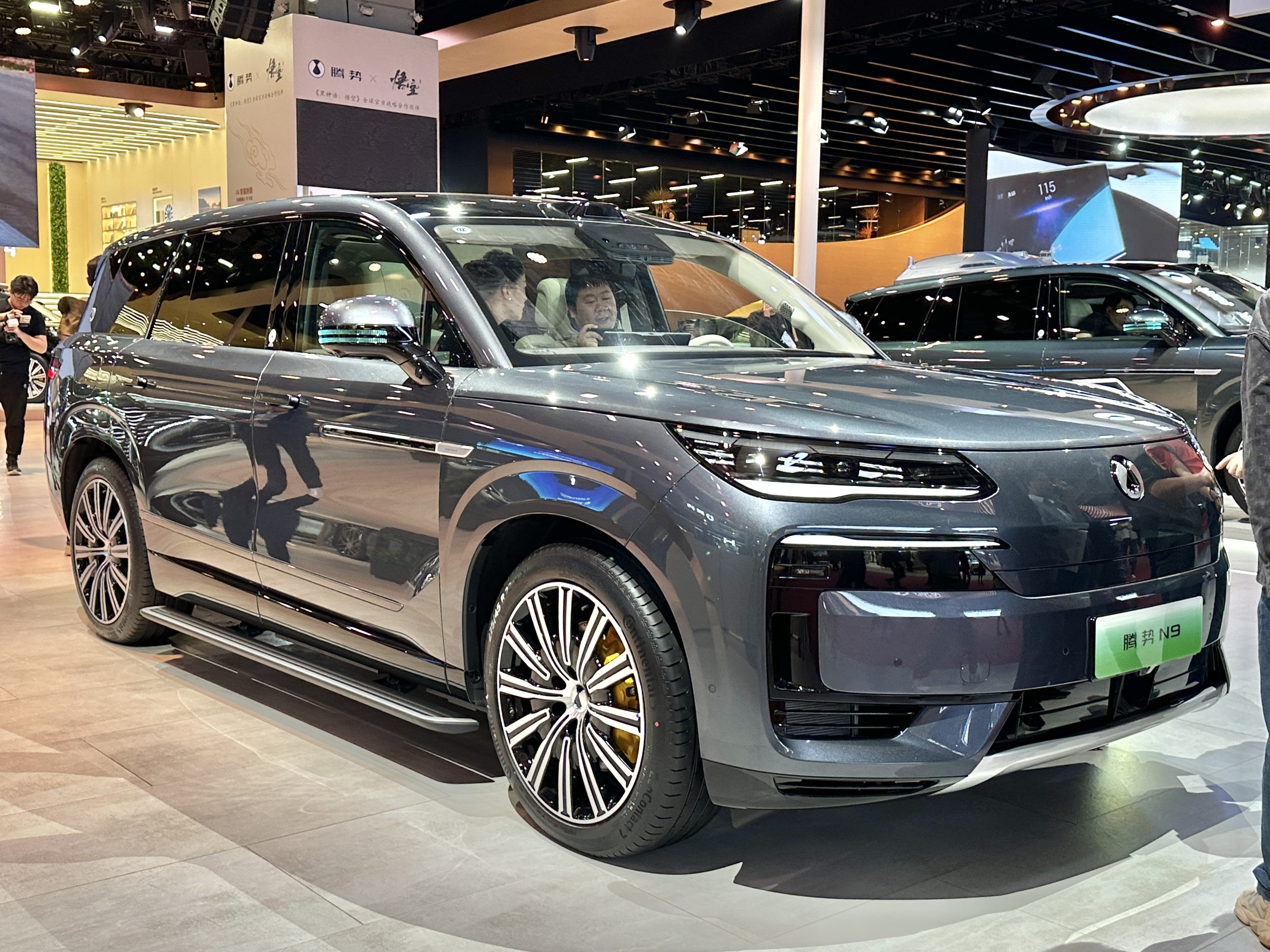
Denza N9

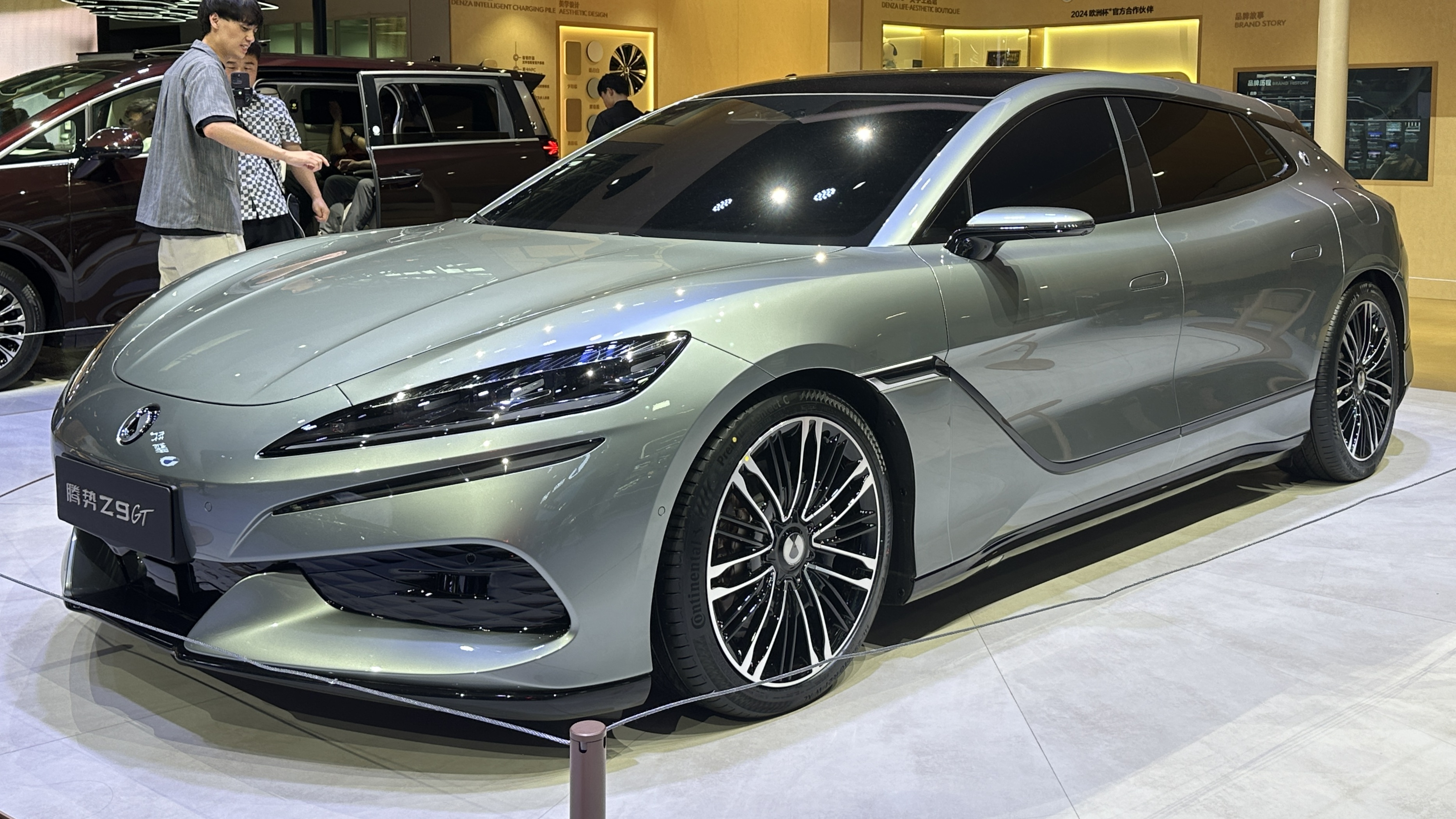
Denza Z9 GT

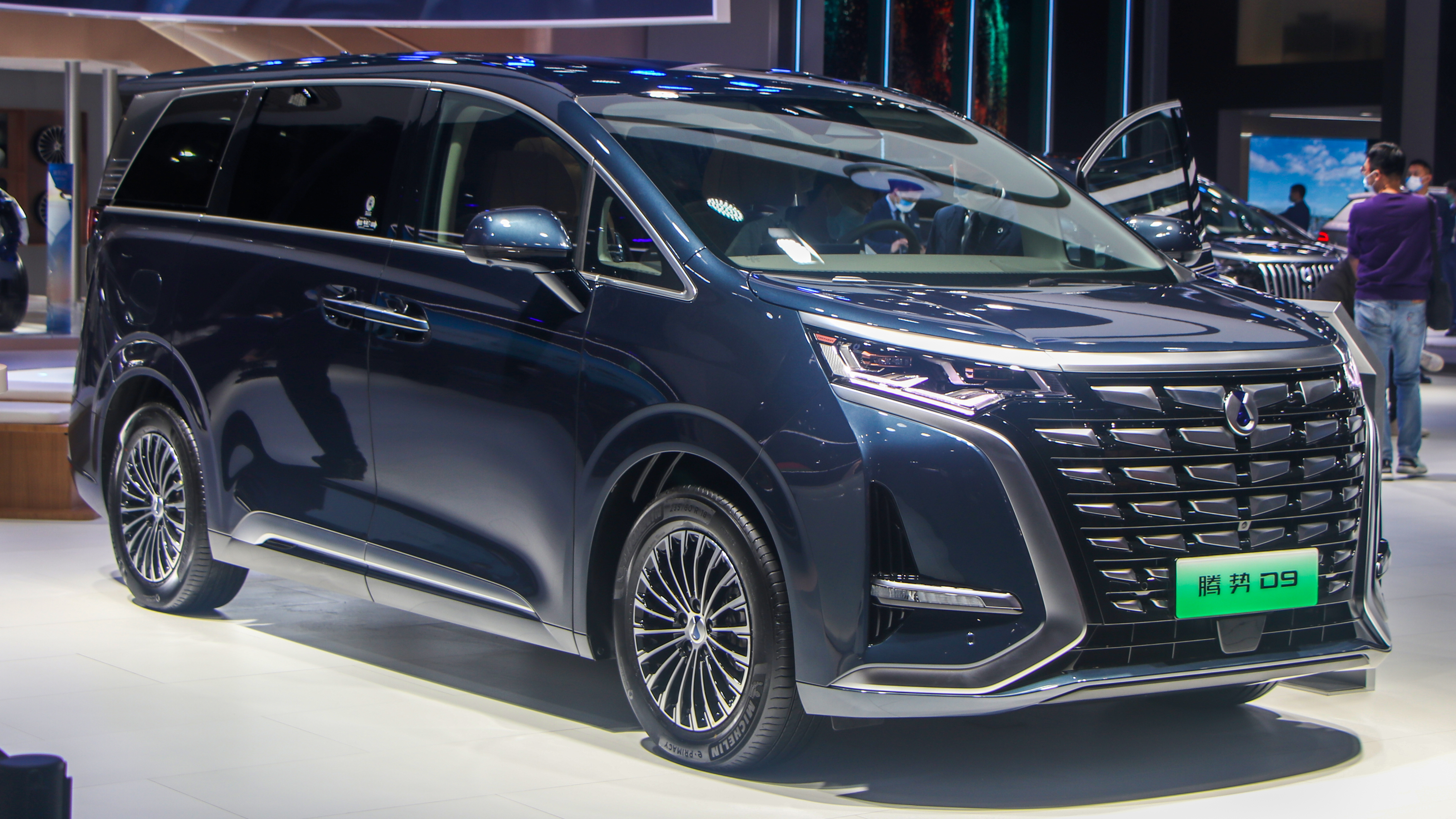
Denza D9

===== Yangwang =====
Yangwang (Chinese: 仰望; lit. 'gazing', 'look up') is BYD's luxury car brand that is positioned in a price range above CN¥1 million (approximately US$140,000) to compete with European luxury brands. The brand was announced on 5 January 2023 at the Guangzhou Auto Show, along with its first model, the U8 off-road plug-in hybrid amphibious SUV, which features BYD's proprietary e^{4} individual wheel drive technology, followed by the U9 battery electric supercar.

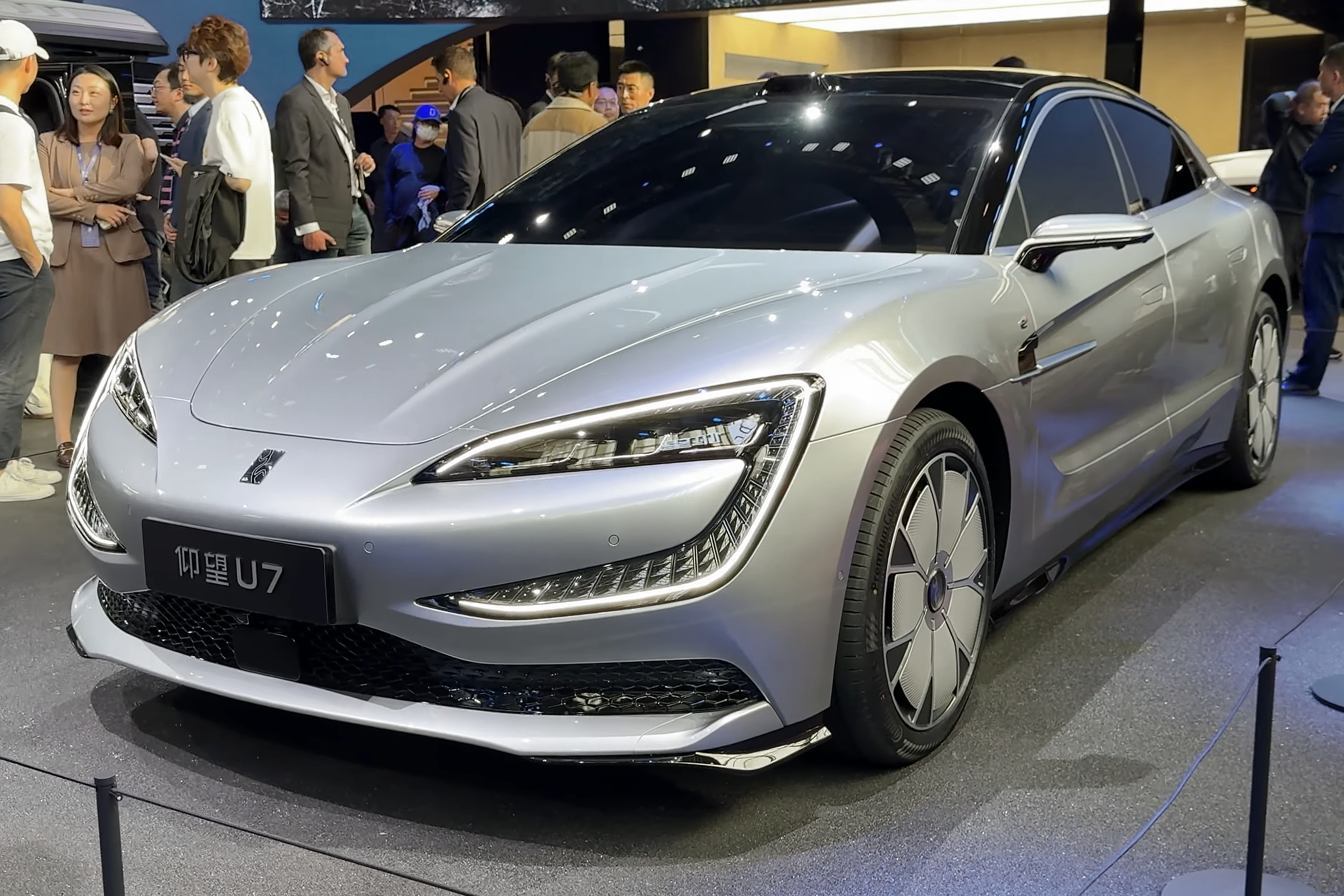
Yangwang U7

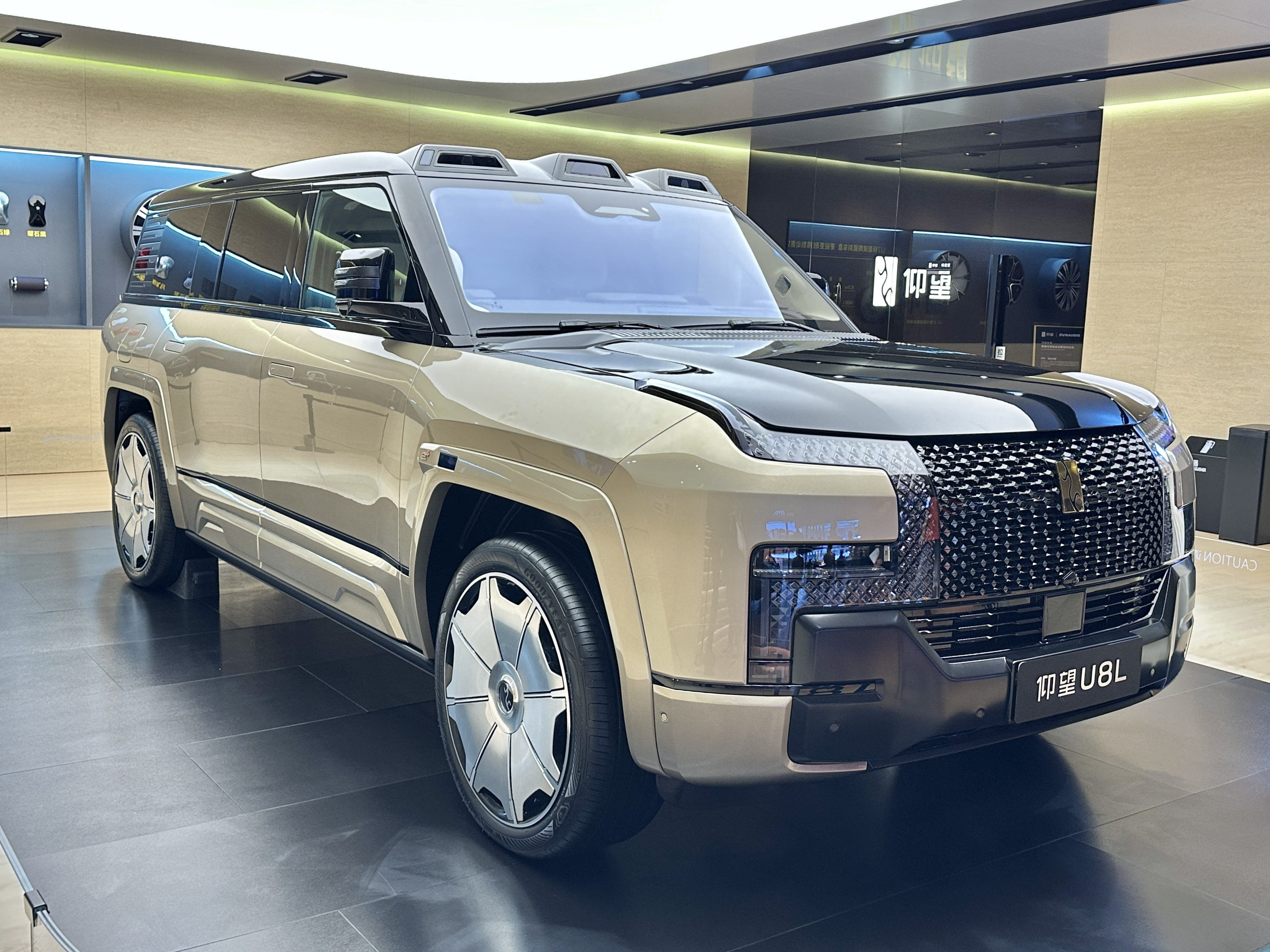
Yangwang U8L

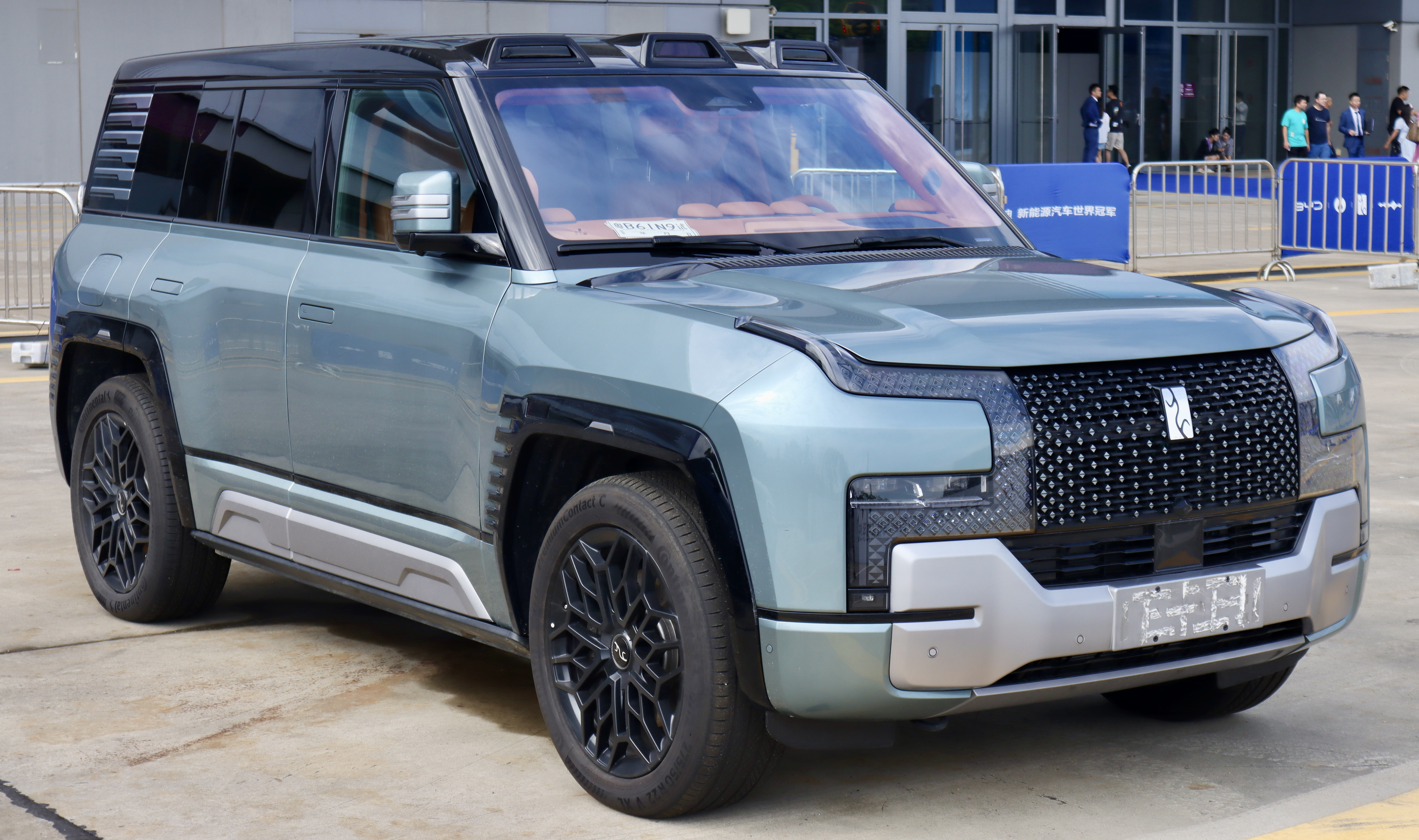
Yangwang U8

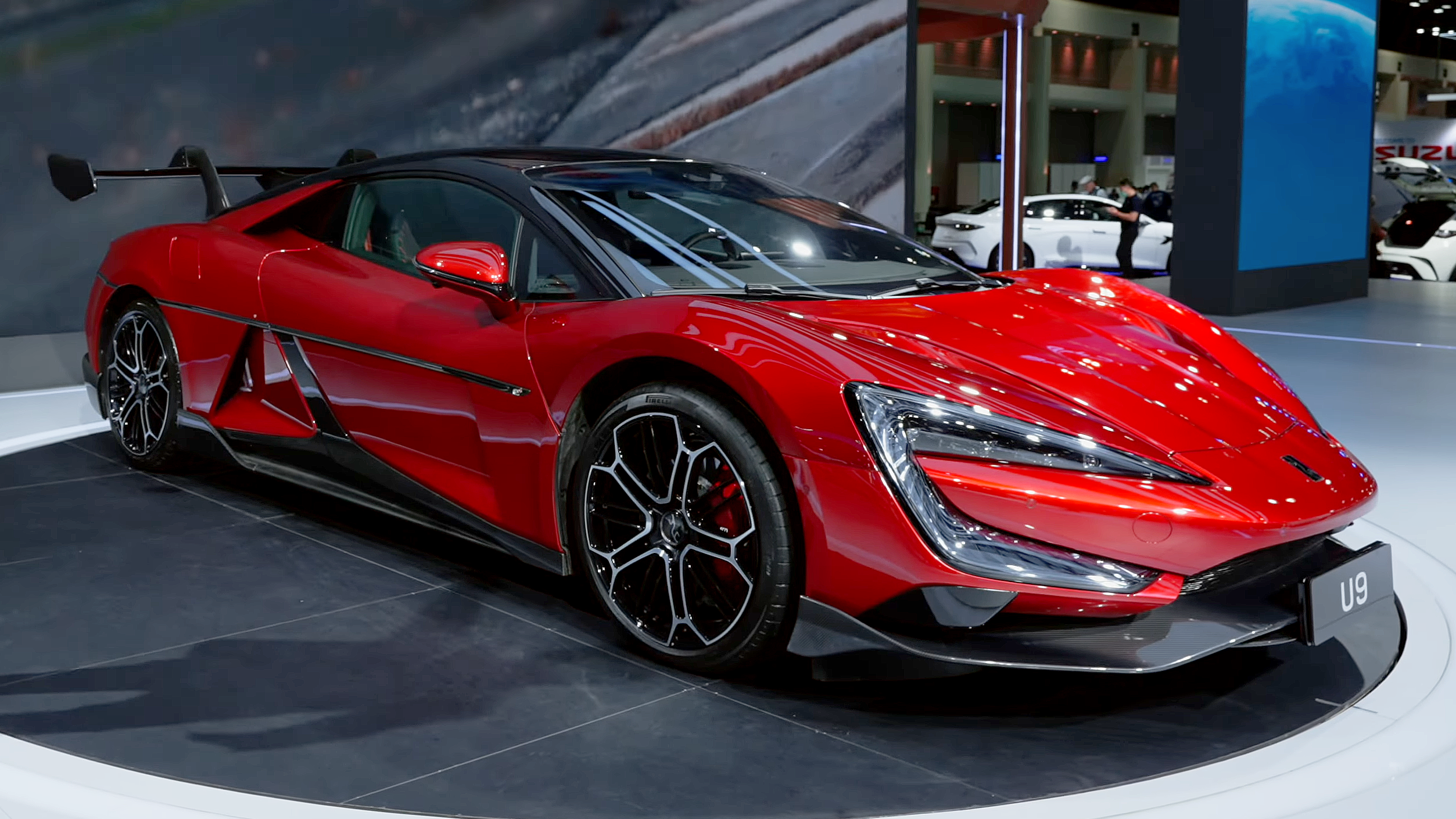
Yangwang U9

==== Linghui ====
Linghui (Chinese: 领汇汽车) is BYD's fifth brand, established specifically to serve the taxi and ride-hailing markets. The marque was created to strategically separate BYD's fleet operations from its consumer vehicles. Linghui operates independently from the main brand, featuring its own dedicated logo and distinct sales channels. Linghui's initial product lineup consists entirely of rebadged existing BYD models.

=== Commercial vehicles ===
==== Light commercial vehicles and taxis ====
The BYD e6, first introduced in 2009 as the first battery electric vehicle from BYD, is predominantly marketed as a taxi. It has been used as a taxi in many cities in China, Europe, and other Asian countries, as well as in fleets for ride-sharing apps. BYD also offers battery electric panel vans and windowed vans such as the T3/ETP3 and V3, and a plug-in hybrid pickup truck, the BYD Shark.

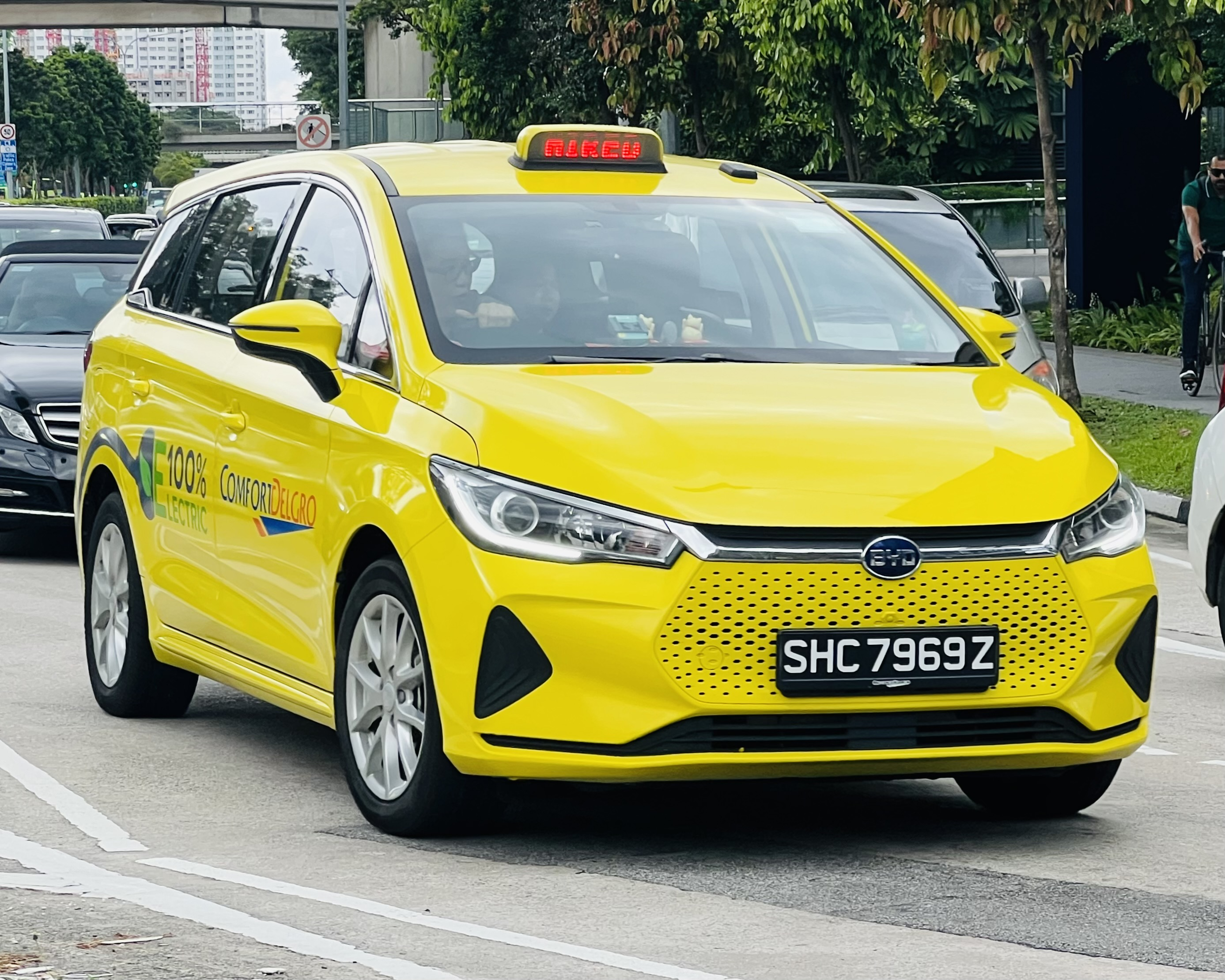
BYD e6 taxi in service in Singapore

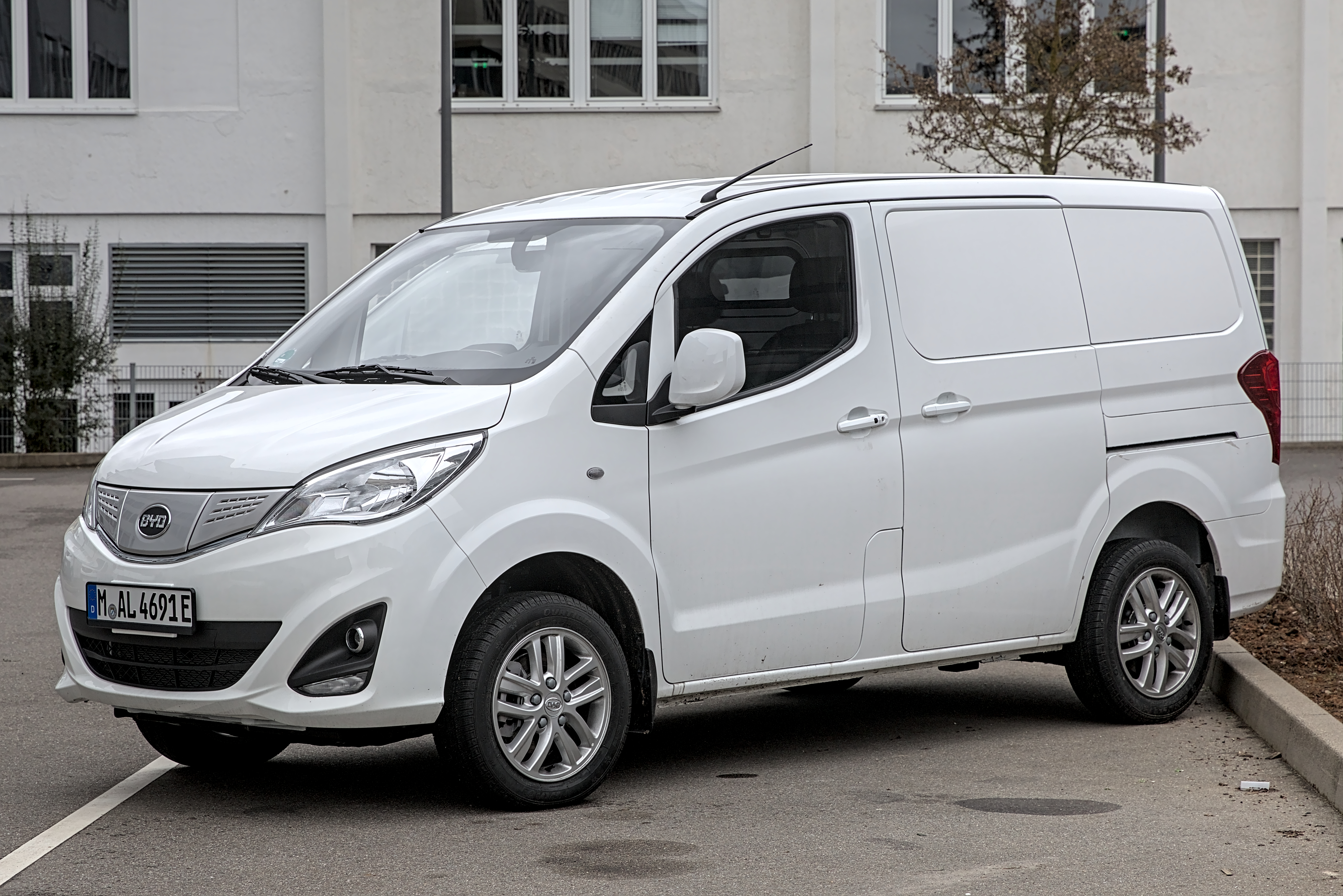
BYD ETP3 in Germany

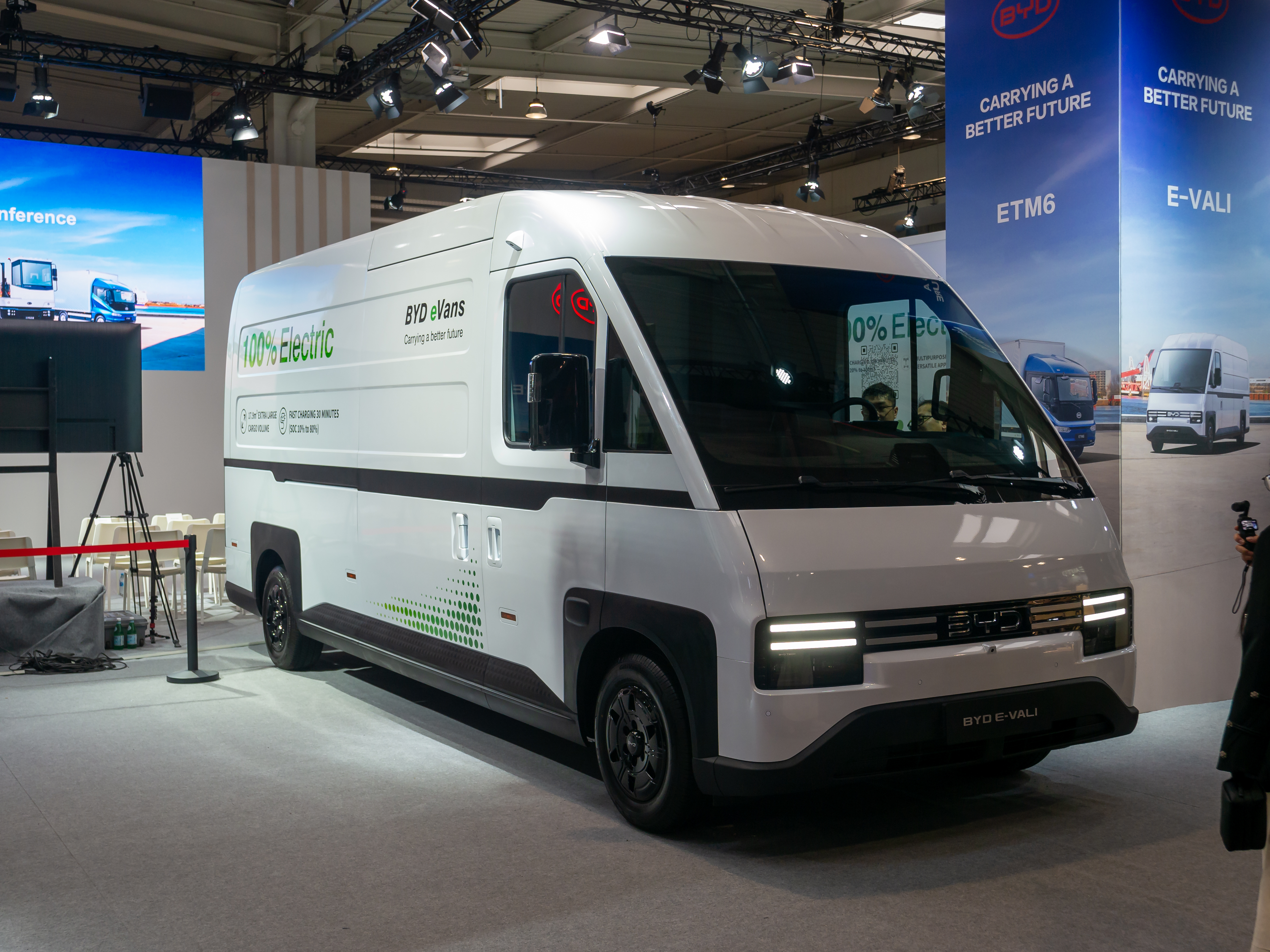
BYD E-Vali in Germany

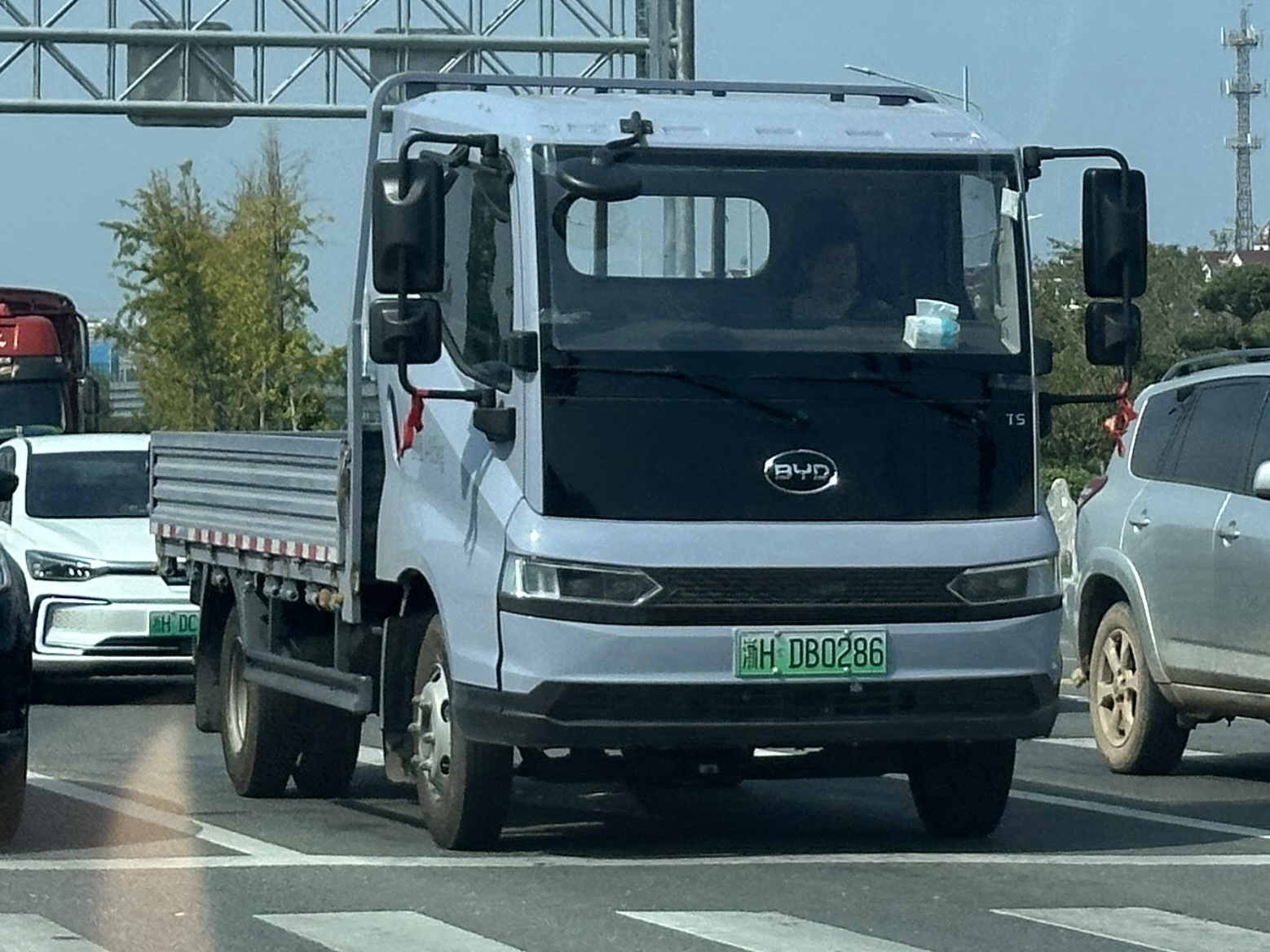
BYD T5

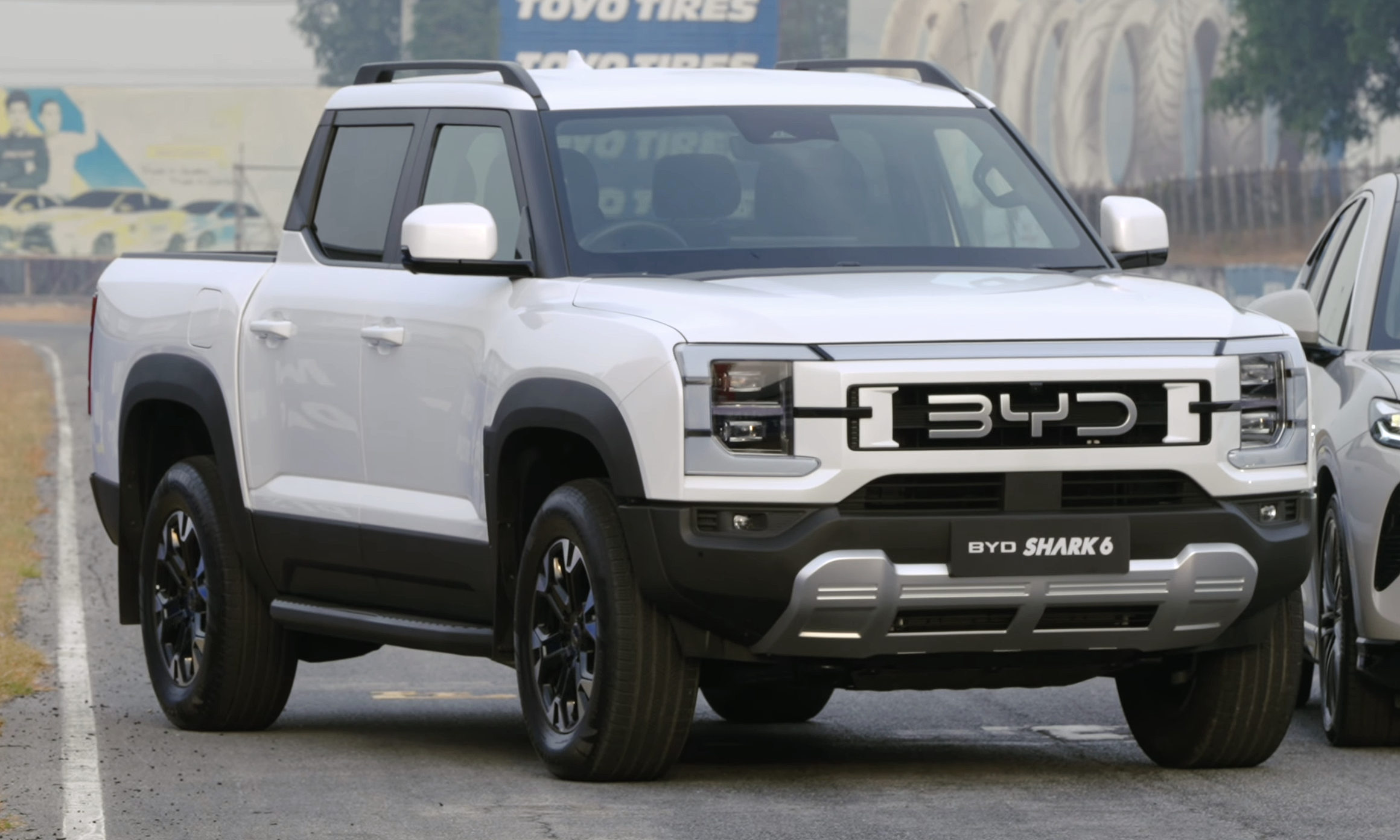
BYD Shark 6

==== Buses ====
BYD produces battery electric buses in various forms and sizes, such as single-deck buses, double-deck buses, articulated buses, school buses, and long-distance coaches. As of 2023, BYD has delivered over 100,000 battery electric buses globally.

In North America, BYD buses are produced in the US at BYD's plant in Lancaster, California. As of 2022, it is the largest battery-electric bus manufacturer in North America.

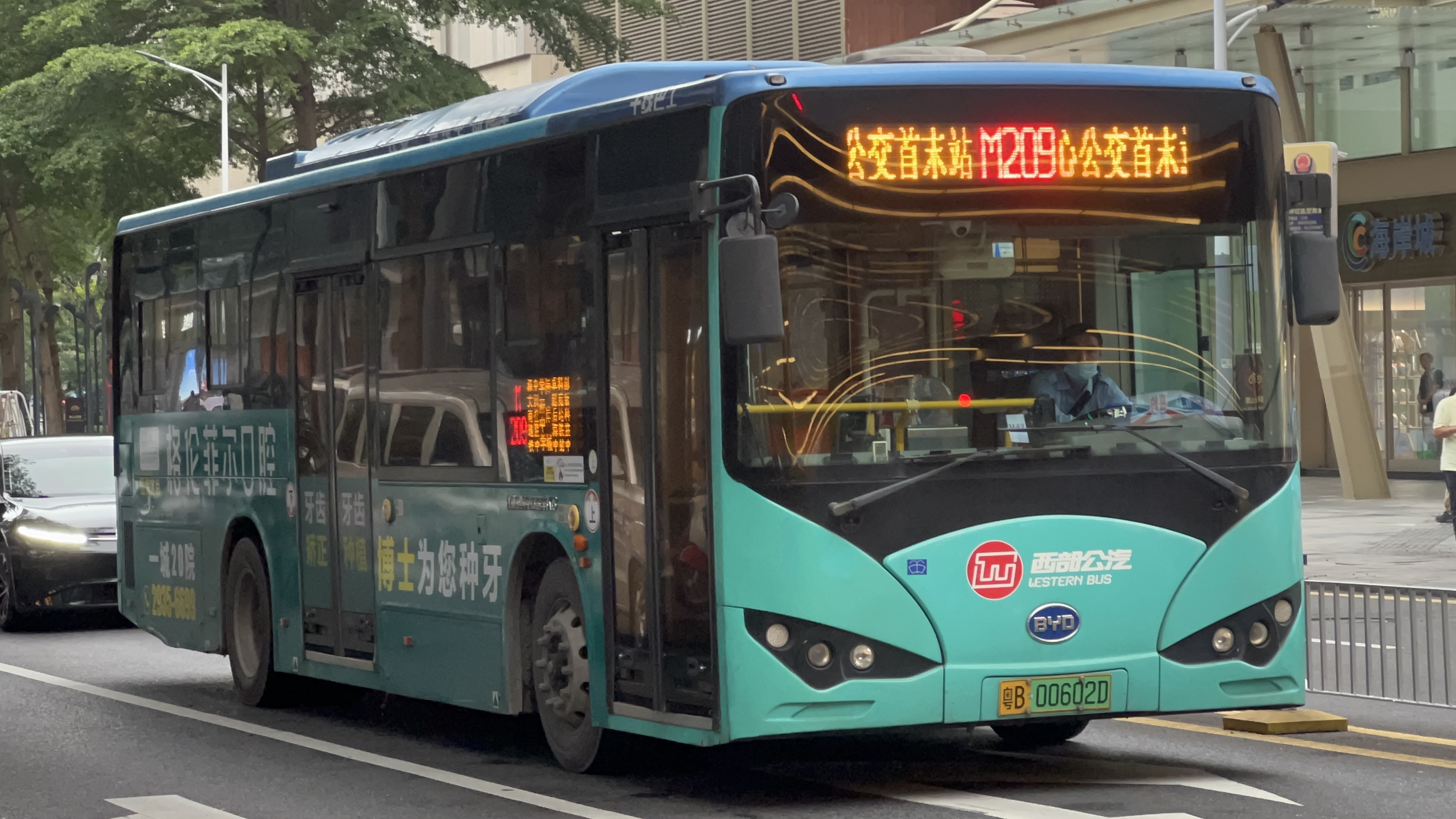
BYD K8 in Shenzhen, China

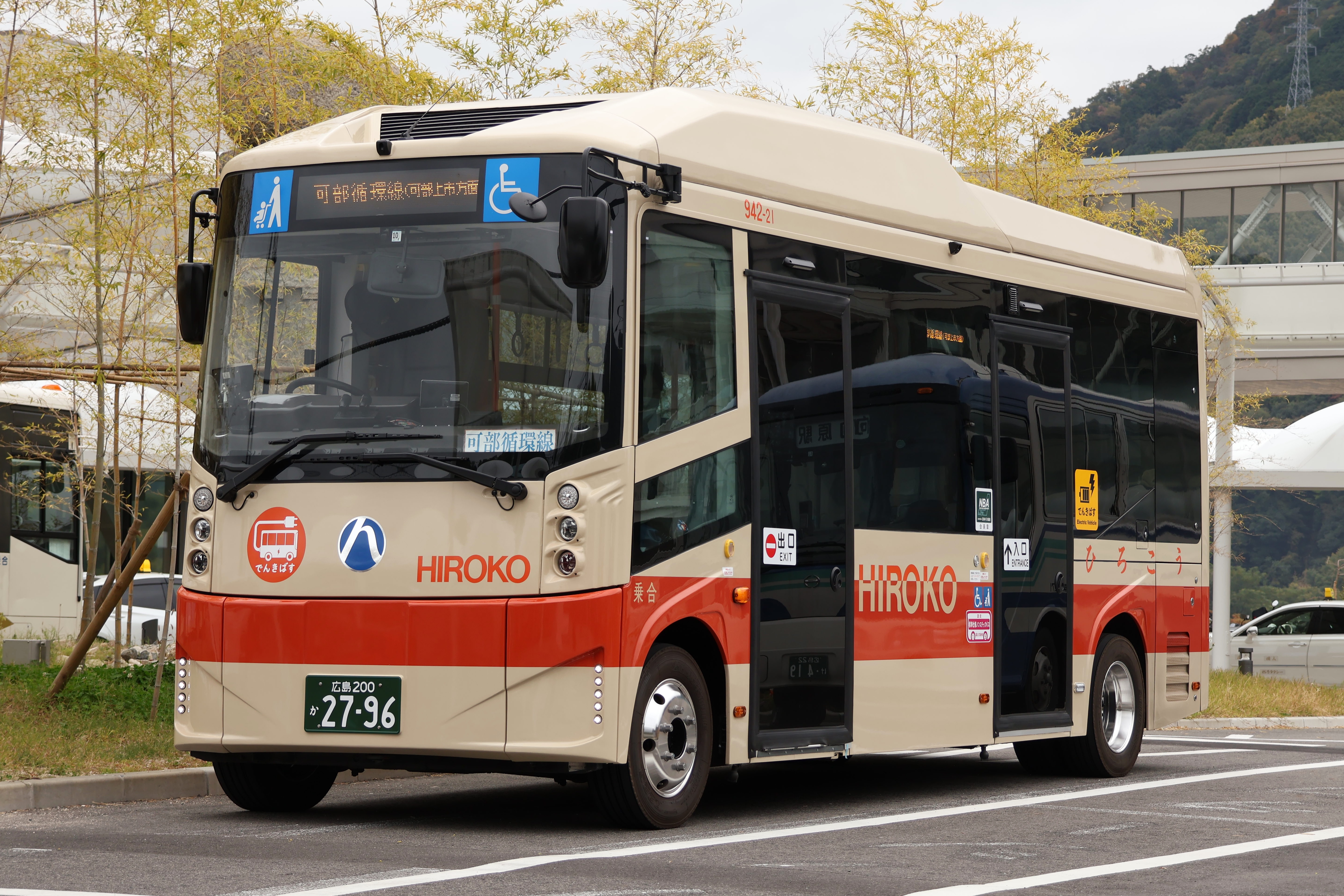
BYD J6 in Hiroshima, Japan

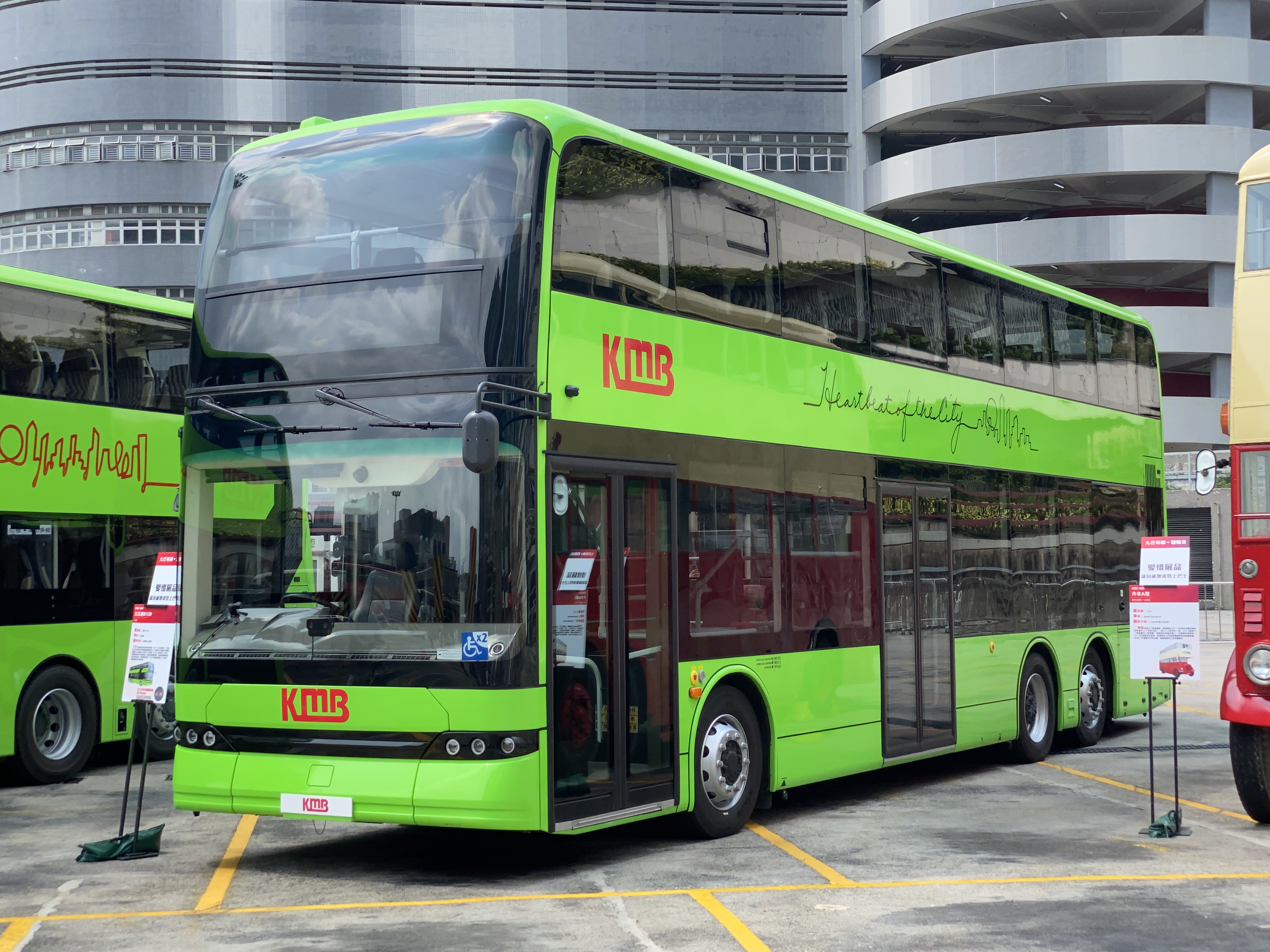
BYD B12D double-decker in Hong Kong

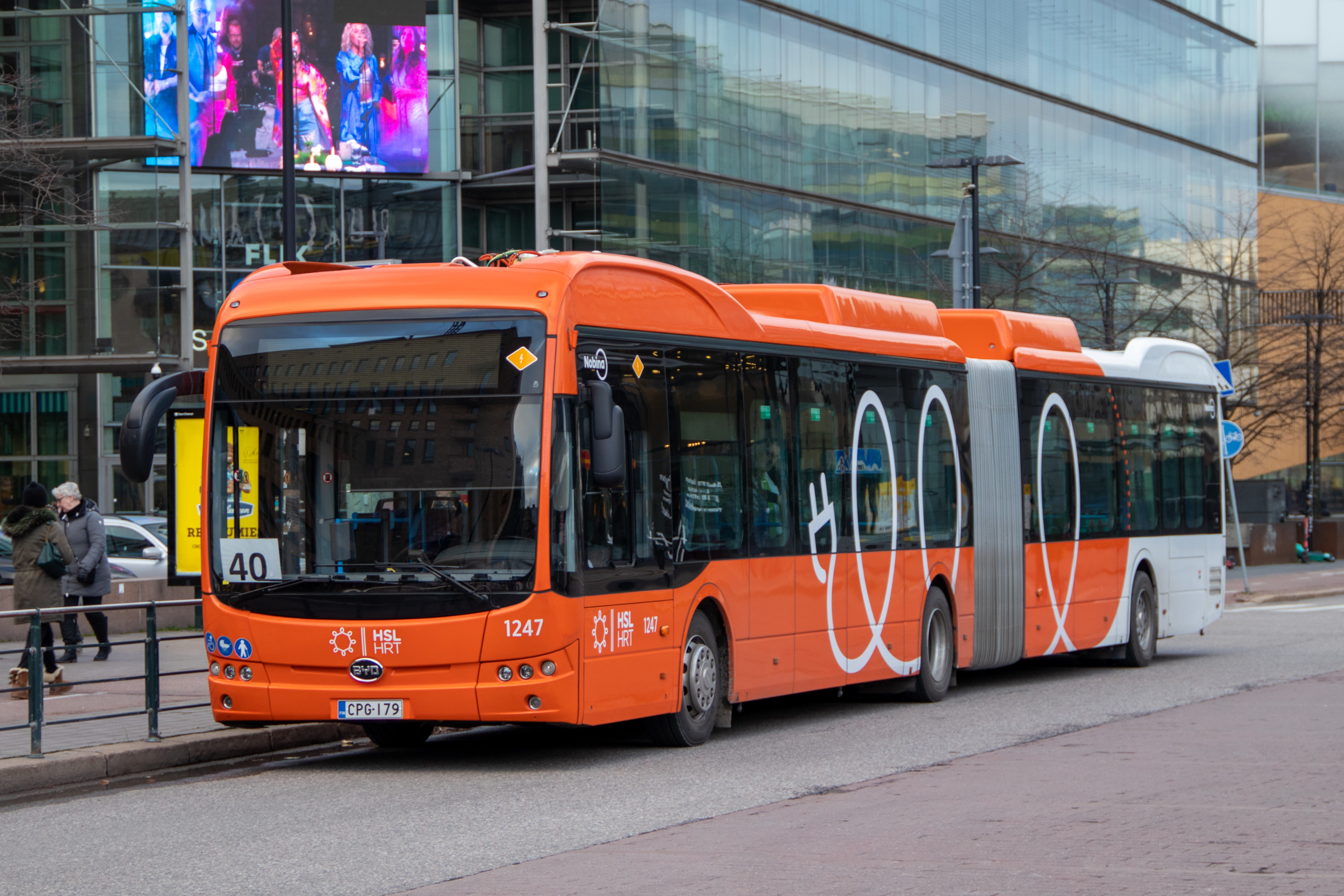
BYD K11U articulated bus in Helsinki, Finland

==== Trucks ====
BYD is one of the largest battery electric truck manufacturers in the world, with more than 8,000 trucks in service globally as of 2021. It has sold more than 200 battery electric trucks in service across the United States. It produces Class 5, Class 6, Class 7 and Class 8 trucks, refuse trucks, street sweeper trucks, mining trucks, and construction vehicles.

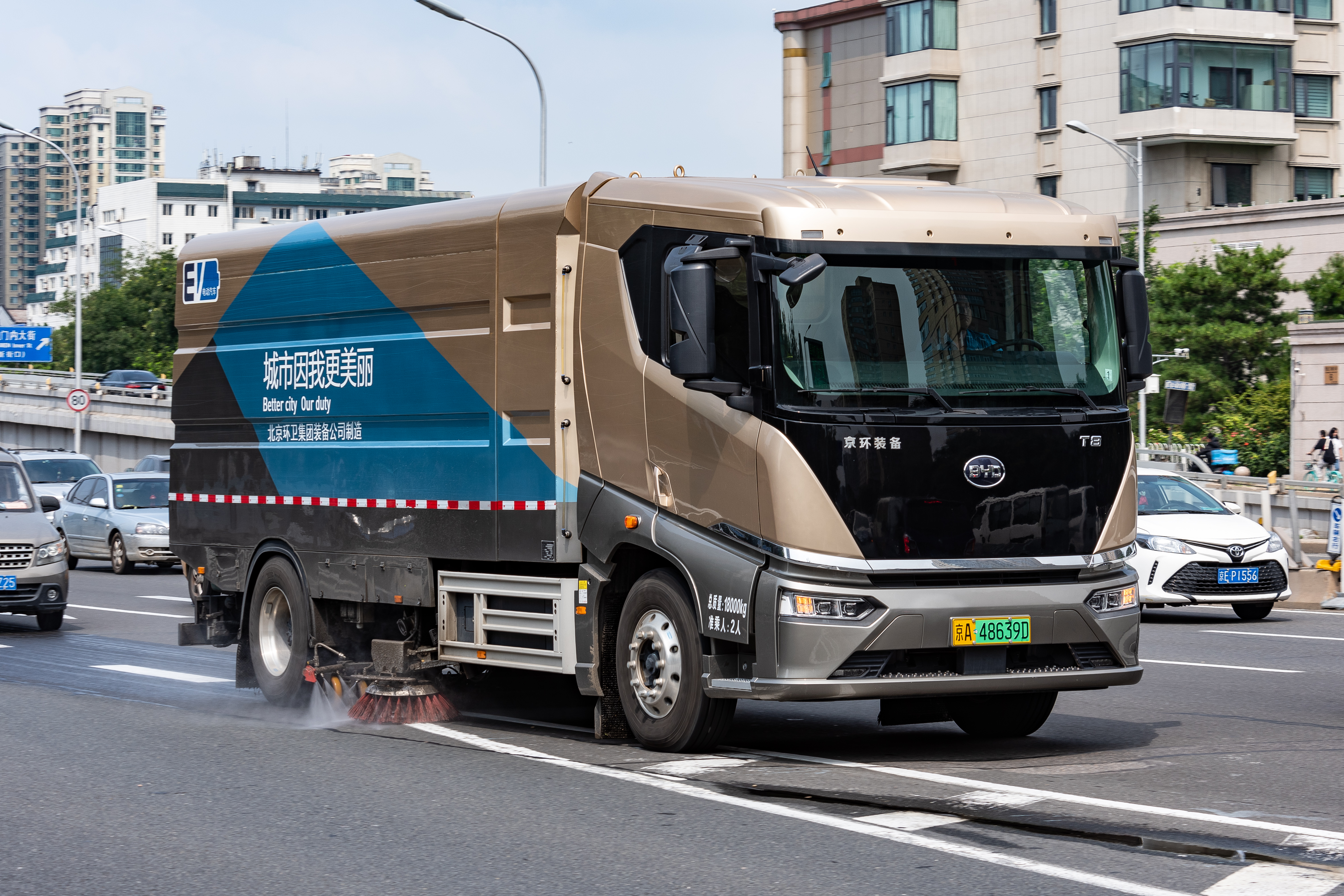
BYD T8 street sweeper truck

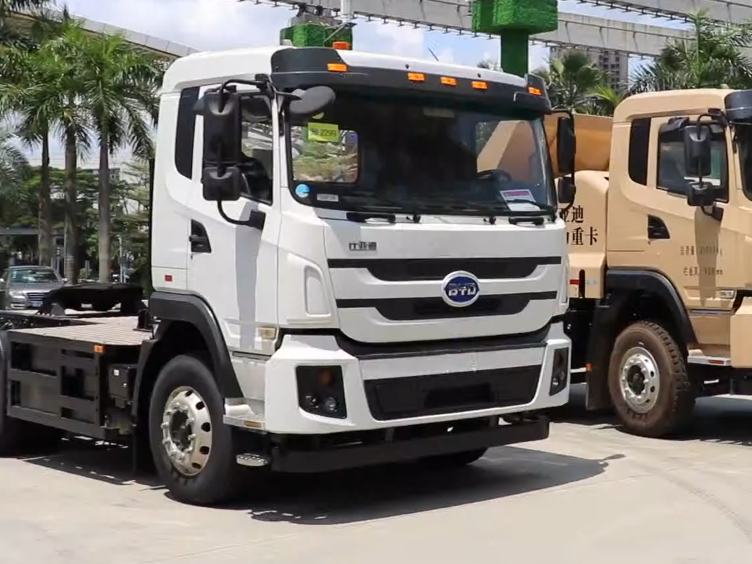
BYD 8TT

== Technologies ==
=== Blade battery ===
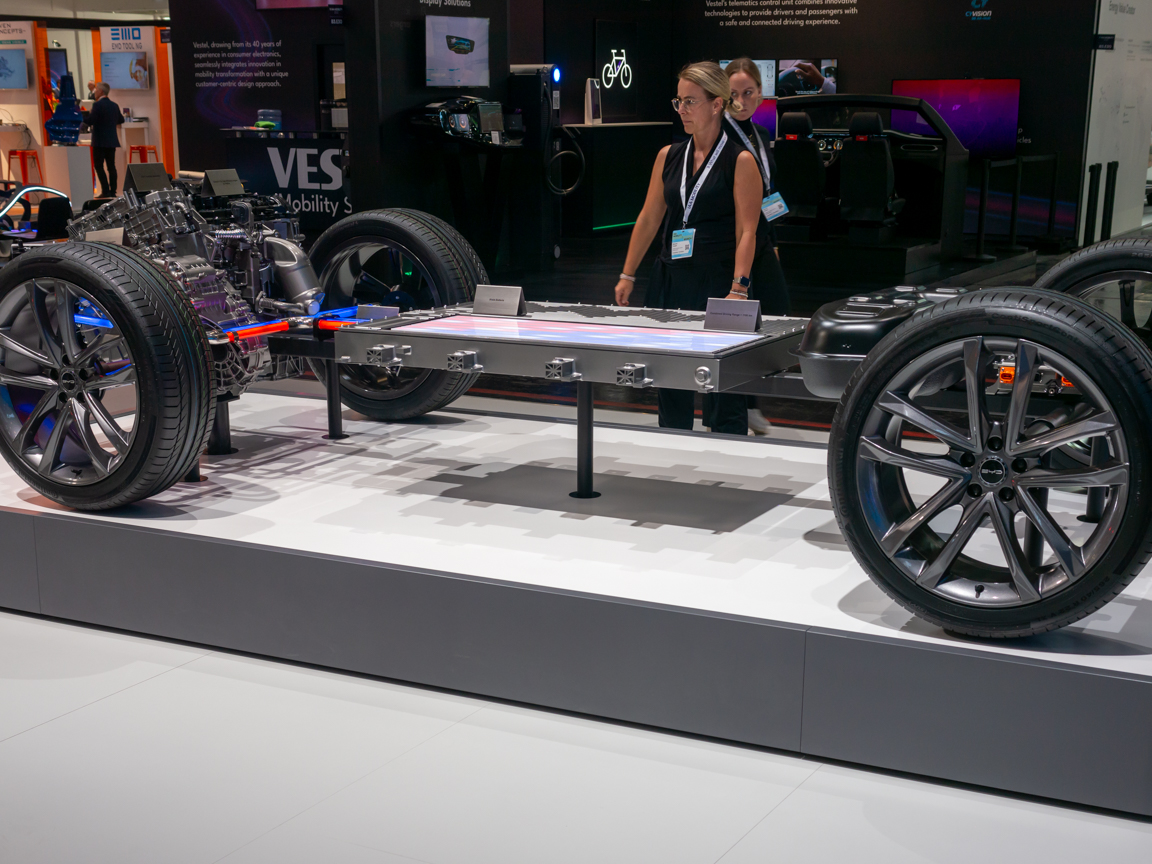
The Blade battery showcased at the IAA Summit 2023, Germany

The Blade battery is a lithium iron phosphate (LFP) battery for electric vehicles designed and manufactured by FinDreams Battery, a subsidiary of BYD Company. It was first used by the BYD Han in 2020. Starting from April 2021, every battery electric vehicle from BYD comes equipped with the Blade battery. The battery is claimed to be thinner and safer than typical electric vehicle batteries, and has been used by other car companies. BYD claims that in a penetration test where the battery is impaled with a nail, the Blade battery emitted no smoke or fire after being penetrated, and its surface temperature reached only 30 to 60 °C (86 to 140 °F). In the same test, a three-layered lithium battery would heat up to over 500 °C (932 °F) and subsequently catch fire.

=== Plug-in hybrid electric systems ===
==== DM (dual mode) ====
The "DM" or "dual mode" is BYD's term for its plug-in hybrid drivetrain technology that was first introduced in 2008 on its early hybrid vehicles such as the BYD F3DM and BYD M3 DM. It consists of a conventional internal combustion engine and transmission as well as an electric motor and batteries. The first generation DM system is considered a series-parallel drivetrain. It uses an E-CVT, which is a power unit integrating a drive motor, a generator and a reducer, and does not have a multi-speed transmission in the traditional sense. The petrol engine drives the generator to charge the battery and power the electric motor, and is able to supply power to the wheels.

In 2013, BYD launched the second-generation DM technology (also called DM2.0). This system is more performance-oriented, and consists of a water-cooled electric motor with a six-speed dual-clutch transmission (DCT) ("P3") and a 1.5-litre turbocharged four-cylinder direct injection petrol engine to form a parallel hybrid drivetrain. It has three driving modes, which are EV, HEV and ICE. This technology was used by the first generations of the BYD Qin, BYD Song, BYD Tang and other models. BYD also offered an all-wheel drive version by adding a drive motor ("P4") to the rear axle. The third-generation DM system (also called DM3.0) brought improved performance and smoother shifting by adding a belt-driven starter generator (BSG).

==== DM-i/DM-p/DMO (fourth generation) ====
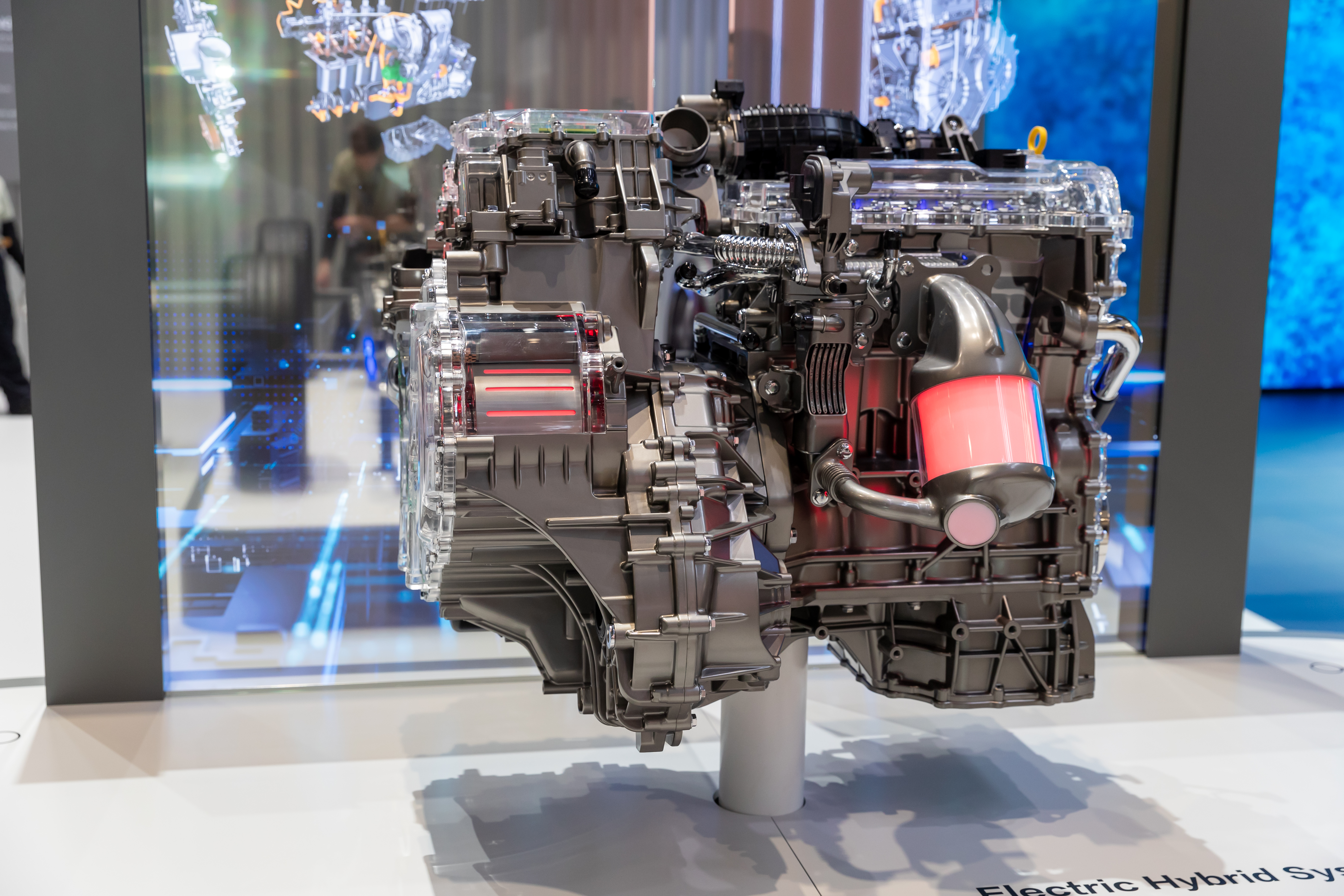
BYD DM-i powertrain on display

In 2021, BYD introduced the DM-i and DM-p systems that replaced the outgoing DM systems. The first models that uses the DM-i system are the Qin Plus DM-i, Song Plus DM-i and Tang DM-i, all released in February 2021. The DM-i was developed for efficiency-oriented front-wheel drive models, while the DM-p is adopted for performance-oriented all-wheel drive models. These systems adopts series-parallel plug-in hybrid technology with a dedicated hybrid transmission (DHT), consisting of a high-efficiency petrol engine marketed as Xiaoyun (which can power an electric generator) and a main electric motor (which can be powered by batteries and/or an electric generator). The Xiaoyun engine uses the Atkinson cycle, has an ultra-high compression ratio (CR) of 15.5, and has a brake thermal efficiency (BTE) of 43%, which is claimed to be the world's highest for a production petrol engine. The DM-i is available with three power levels, codenamed EHS132, EHS145, and EHS160, using a 1.5-litre, a 1.5-litre or a 1.5-litre turbocharged Xiaoyun engines respectively.

The hybrid drivetrain uses context-dependent components to provide driving power, including battery-only, battery + electrical generator mode, engine-only mode (only at high speeds due to lack of a multiple-geared transmission), and battery + engine mode. The engine charges the batteries via the generator when conditions permit. This design allows the engine to remain within its high-efficiency zone.

In late 2023, a derivative of the DM-i and DM-p fourth-generation systems called DMO (Dual Mode Off-road), aka DMO Super Hybrid Off-road Platform was introduced. It is developed for body-on-frame, off-road oriented vehicles that use a longitudinal engine layout such as the Fangchengbao Bao 5 SUV and the BYD Shark pickup truck.

In January 2024, BYD plans to end the production of pouch-type batteries used in its plug-in hybrid vehicles by 2025 to address durability concerns and the risk of leaking electrolyte. Instead, the company will use prismatic batteries known as "Short Blade" for its plug-in hybrid vehicles going forward.

==== Fifth generation DM-i ====
The fifth-generation DM-i system (DM-i 5.0) was introduced in May 2024 with the introduction of the BYD Qin L and BYD Seal 06 DM-i. The system is claimed to have the world's highest engine thermal efficiency of 46.06%, the world's lowest fuel consumption at 2.9 l/100 km (34 km/l; 81 mpg_{‑US}), and the world's longest combined range of 2,100 km (1,300 mi).

=== Battery electric vehicle platforms ===
==== e-Platform ====
The e-Platform, or retroactively known as the e-Platform 1.0 was launched in 2010. It was first adopted by the first-generation BYD e6.

==== e-Platform 2.0 ====
The e-Platform 2.0 is a modular car platform specialised for battery electric vehicles. It was introduced in 2018, and went on production with the BYD Han EV in 2020. The platform is summarised by the "33111" concept: the first "3" refers to the three-in-one drive system, which integrates the motor, motor controller, and reducer; the second "3" refers to the 3-in-1 high-voltage system, encompassing the DC-DC converter, on-board charger, and high-voltage distribution box. The three "1"s represent the integrated printed circuit board, the smart infotainment screen, and the high-performance and safer battery.

==== e-Platform 3.0 ====
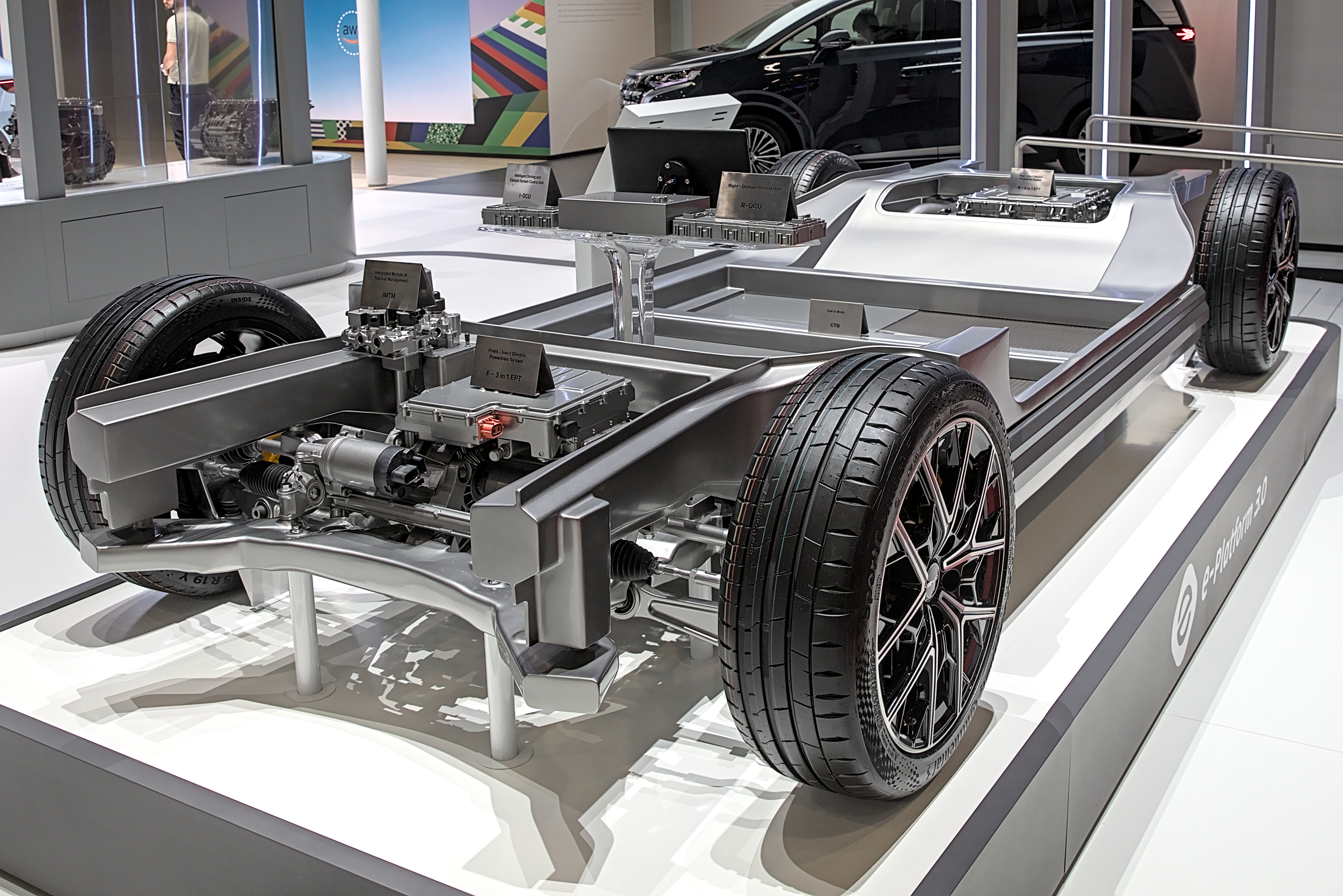
The e-Platform 3.0 on display

The e-Platform 3.0 is a modular car platform specialised for battery electric vehicles. It offers improved integration of BYD's proprietary Blade battery technology into an improved pure electric frame with doubled torsional stiffness, a more efficient 8-in-1 module for the drive system, a direct cooling and heating system for the battery pack (utilising residual heat, the powertrain, the passenger compartment, and the battery itself) for increased thermal efficiency of up to 20%, as well as shorter front overhangs, a lower body profile, and a longer wheelbase to improve aerodynamics. The platform enables all-electric ranges exceeding 1,000 km (620 mi), with 800-volt fast charging technology for a range of up to 150 km (93 mi) after 5 minutes of charging and allows for an all-wheel drive (AWD) system with 0-100 km/h (62 mph) acceleration in as fast as 2.9 seconds. It allows for cell-to-body (CTB) battery integration, replacing the outgoing cell-to-pack (CTP) technology.

The first vehicles designed using this platform are the Dolphin, Yuan Plus (Atto 3 in overseas markets), Seal, Denza D9 EV, among others.

===== e-Platform 3.0 Evo =====
In 2024, BYD introduced an improved version of the platform called the e-Platform 3.0 Evo. It features a 12-in-1 electric drive system, replacing the previous 8-in-1 system. It also features the world highest speed mass-produced electric drive motor reaching 23,000 rpm, faster charging speed, and a high-efficiency heat pump. The first vehicle that uses this platform is the BYD Sealion 07 EV.

==== Super e-Platform ====
The Super e-Platform is BYD's latest battery electric platform with an overhaul in propulsion, power electronics, and battery architecture. The platform incorporates a 1000 V electrical system, supports a maximum charging power of 1,000 kW (1 MW), and introduces advancements in motor speed, power density, and semiconductor components. The platform also supports dual-gun charging configurations.

The Super e-Platform includes the first mass-produced 30,000 rpm electric traction motor, that achieves a peak output of 580 kW (778 hp; 789 PS) and a maximum rotational speed of 30,511 revolutions per minute. The increase in rotational speed allows for a more compact and lightweight design, and enabling higher vehicle top speeds exceeding 300 km/h (190 mph). The motor's power density is rated at 16.4 kW/kg. To support such power output and rotational speed, the platform integrates a new generation of silicon carbide (SiC) power semiconductors with a voltage rating of up to 1500 V. The SiC devices contribute to thermal management efficiency and extend operational voltage margins, which are necessary for 1000 V architectures.

The battery system used in the Super e-Platform consists of reengineered blade cells labeled as Flash Charging Battery. These cells support a 10C charging rate, a current of up to 1000 A, and voltage operation up to 1000 V, enabling a peak charging power of 1,000 kW (1 MW).

The first production models utilizing this platform are the BYD Han L EV and BYD Tang L EV. These vehicles feature acceleration times of 0–100 km/h (0–62 mph) as fast as 2.7 seconds, depending on configuration.

=== Fast charging systems ===
==== 1,000 kW fast charging (2025) ====
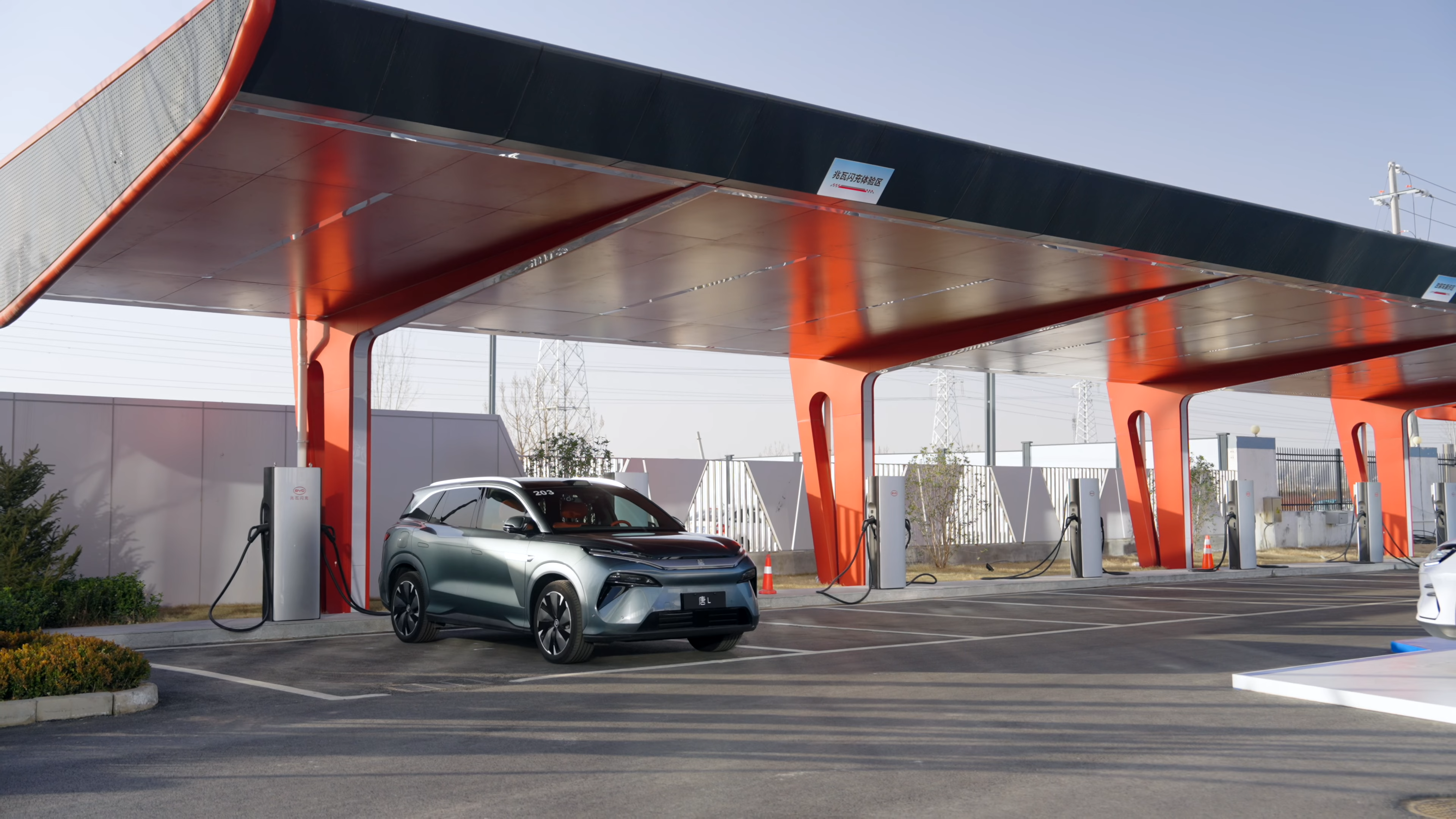
BYD's 1,000 kW (1 MW) charging station

In March 2025, BYD introduced a 1,000 kW fast charging system as part of its Super e-Platform. The system operates at 1,000 volts and supports charging currents up to 1,000 amperes, delivering a peak charging power of 1,000 kW (1 MW). It uses a revised version of BYD's Blade battery with a 10C charging rate, which enables approximately 400 km (250 mi) of range to be added in five minutes with an approximate rate of 2 km (1.2 mi) of range per second. The battery improvements include a new electrolyte formulation and a modified separator designed to support high current flow and rapid charge acceptance without overheating or degradation.

The charging system includes liquid-cooled charging cables to manage heat generated during high-power transfers. To mitigate stress on the electrical grid, the charging stations are equipped with integrated energy storage systems, which act as buffers to supply power during peak demand or in locations with limited grid capacity.

BYD plans to deploy over 4,000 of these 1 MW chargers across China, with around 500 stations expected to be operational in the initial rollout phase. These stations are designed to be compatible with upcoming BYD models, beginning with the BYD Han L and BYD Tang L, which are the first vehicles configured to utilize the full capabilities of the 1 MW infrastructure.

==== 1,500 kW Flash Charging and second-generation Blade battery (2026) ====
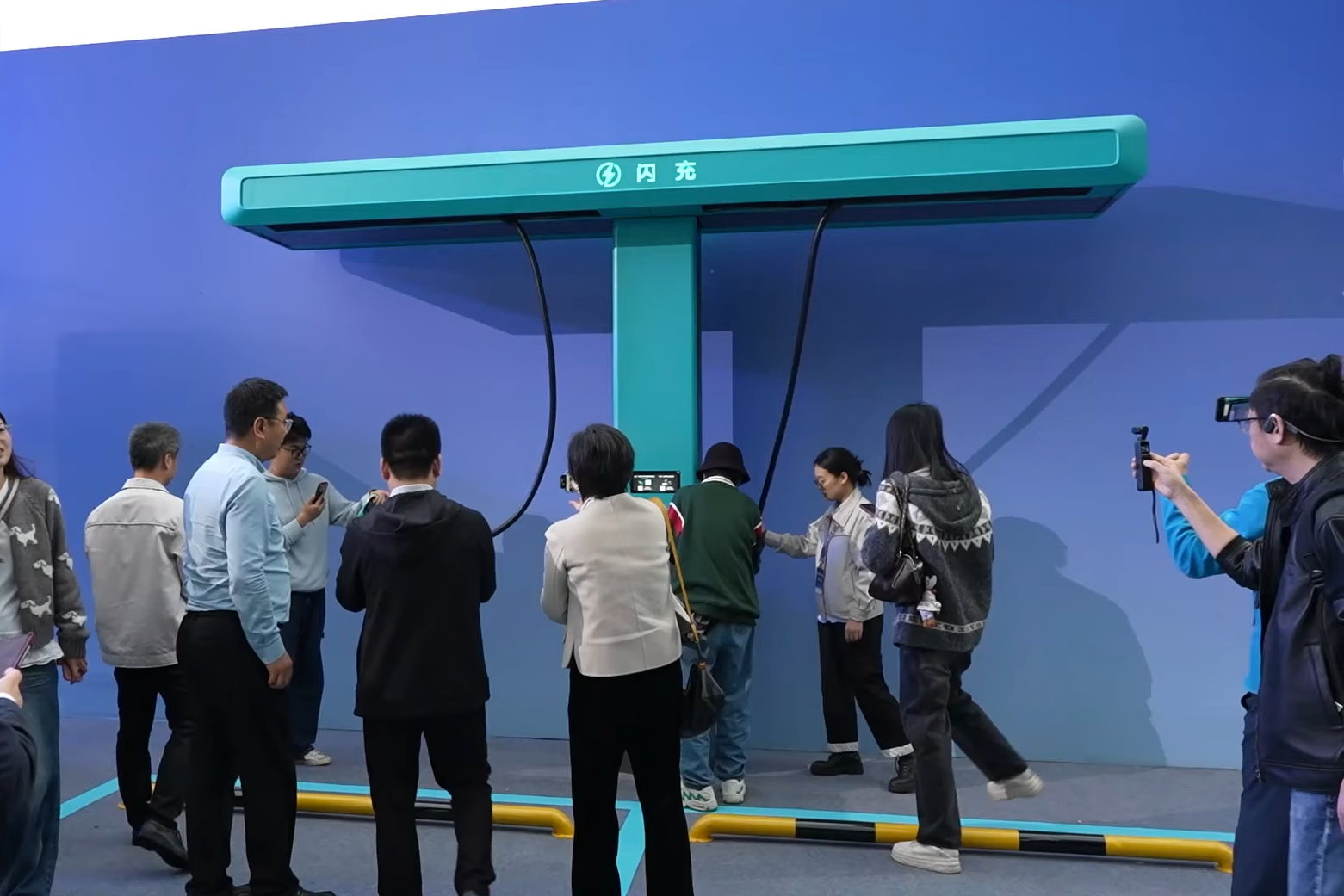

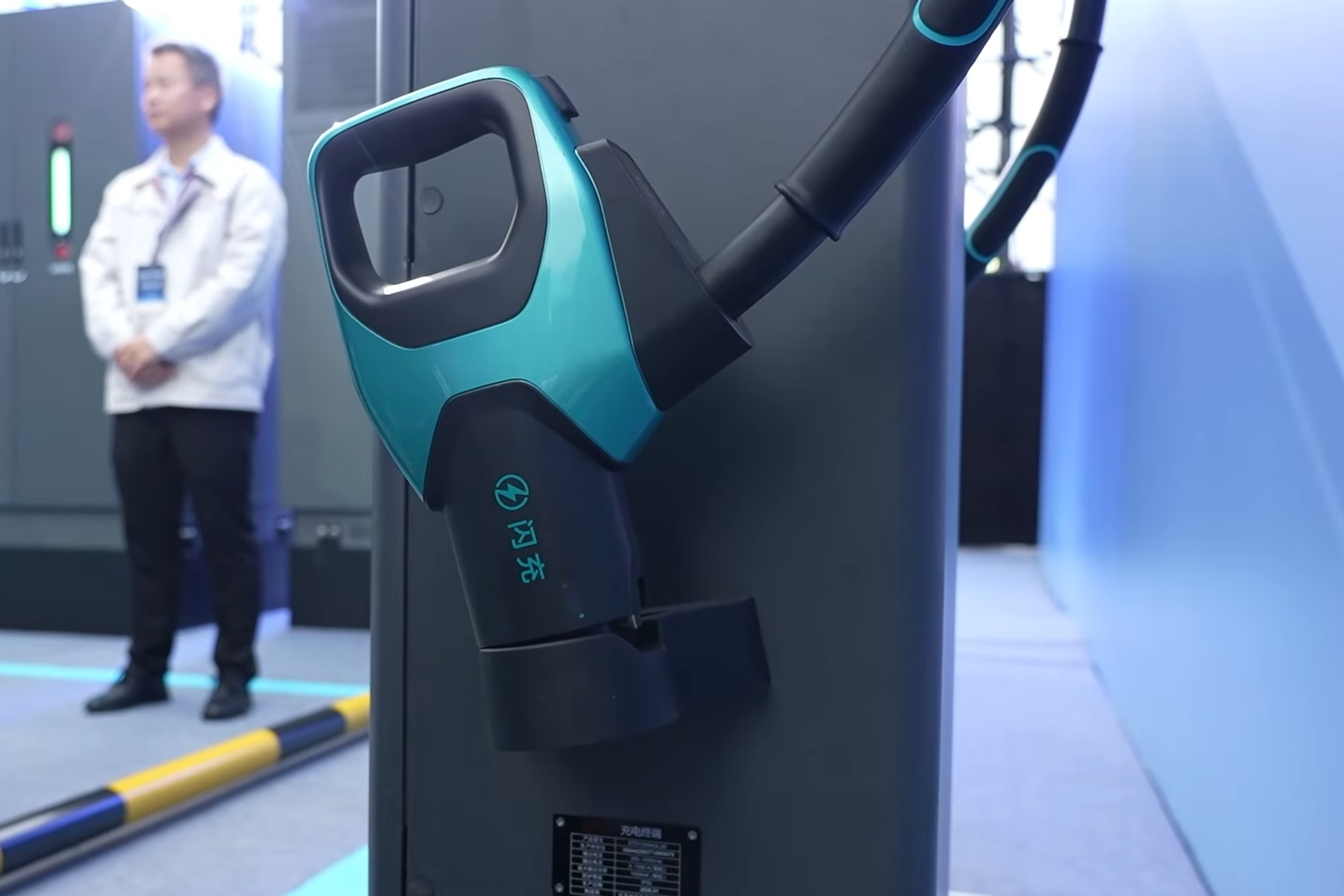
BYD's Flash Charging station with its T-shaped design

In March 2026, BYD introduced its second-generation Blade battery alongside an ultra-fast "Flash Charging" (Chinese: 闪充; pinyin: Shǎnchōng) technology. The updated battery architecture is claimed to feature higher energy density, an extended operational lifespan, and improved safety standards compared to the first generation. It enables highly rapid charging, allowing a compatible vehicle to charge from a 10% to 70% state of charge in 5 minutes, and from 10% to 97% in 9 minutes. The battery's thermal management system is designed to maintain rapid charging capabilities in extreme cold environments; at temperatures of -20 °C (-4 °F), the battery can charge from 20% to 97% in 12 minutes. At -30 °C (-22 °F), charging times are extended by only 3 minutes compared to standard room temperature rates.

To support the second-generation Blade battery, BYD simultaneously deployed a new generation of Flash Charging stations capable of a maximum single-gun output power of 1,500 kW (1.5 MW) operating on a 1,000 V high-voltage system.

=== Automobiles semiconductor ===
==== Xuanji A3 ====
On 28 May 2026, at the intelligent strategy launch conference held by BYD, Wang Chuanfu, Chairman and President of BYD Company, released "Xuanji A3" (Chinese: 璇玑A3), BYD's 567th automobile-grade chip and first in-house developed assisted driving chip, Also is China's first automotive-grade 4 nm assisted driving chip.

The Xuanji A3 was entirely developed, designed, and tested by BYD Semiconductor. Its CPU has 16 cores, power consumption per unit of computing power is 20% lower, and it supports L3 and L4 level autonomous driving. The computing power of the whole vehicle (3 chips) exceeds 2100 TOPS. Combined with self-developed algorithms for deep optimization, the computing power utilization rate is improved by 100%. The chip has started mass production.

=== Driver assistance ===
In April 2020, BYD introduced DiPilot, a branding it uses for its advanced driver-assistance system (ADAS). It debuted with the BYD Han. DiPilot consisted of DiTrainer, a big data algorithm that can learn the driver's driving habits, and DiDAS, the core ADAS feature.

In September 2024, BYD established an advanced technology R&D center to support smart driving systems, smart cockpits, dual-mode technology, and other departments related to computing power, algorithms, and large models. The company claims it has a team of 5,000 R&D engineers solely working on driver assistance technologies.

==== TianShen ====
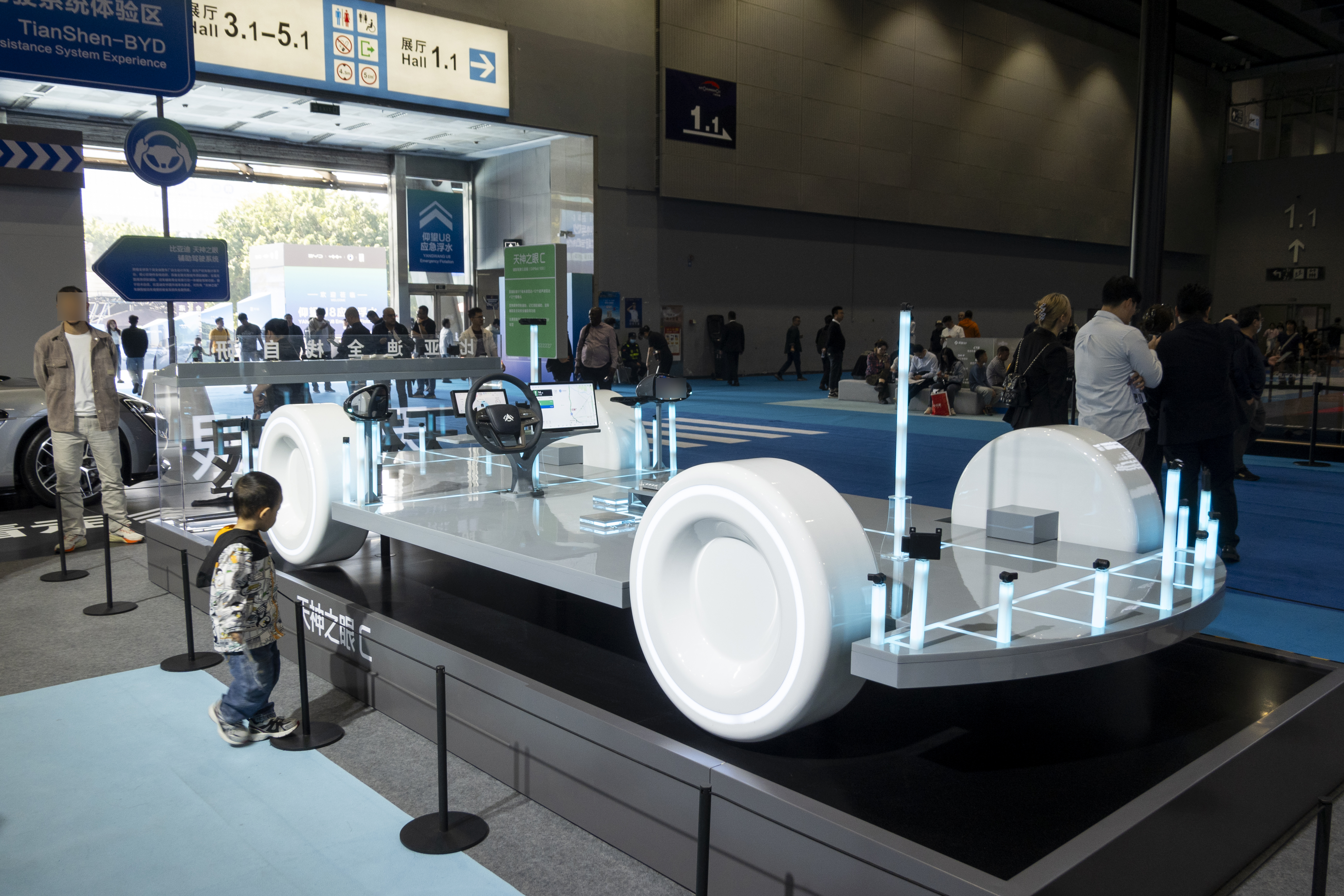
Demonstration of BYD TianShen C

BYD's latest proprietary driver assistance/self-driving system is named TianShen (Chinese: 天神之眼; lit. 'God's Eye', alternatively 'Divine Eye'), which enables driver-supervised automation in tasks such as overtaking and parking. Categorised as "Level 2+" automation (except the Level 3 TianShen A), BYD claimed the TianShen system can accomplish "over 1,000 kilometers of autonomous driving without intervention and has a 99% success rate for automated valet parking". TianShen is planned for incorporation on almost all models of BYD vehicles.

The first model to feature the TianShen system is the Denza N7, which was introduced in July 2023. During its introduction, the Denza N7 can be optioned with two different TianShen system. The advanced version uses Nvidia Orin X 254 trillion operations per second (TOPS) processor and a more advanced radar, or a Qualcomm chip in the standard option.

The TianShen A and B versions are provided by Chinese autonomous driving solution company Momenta, while the C version is developed in-house by BYD.

In February 2025, BYD announced that the system became fitted as standard to 21 of BYD's 30 cars split across four brands, including its cheapest and smallest vehicle, the BYD Seagull. As of 2025, the "TianShen" system is available in three tiers, each designed for different vehicle models and price ranges, which are:

- TianShen A: The most advanced version, used by Yangwang vehicles. Equipped with three LIDAR sensors, and is Level 3 highway and city capable. Powered by the DiPilot 600 system with two Nvidia Orin X chips, supporting up to 600 TOPS of computing power. Supports NOA (Navigation on Autopilot) function in cities and highways.
- TianShen B: Used on Denza and BYD vehicles priced above 200,000 RMB. Equipped with an additional LIDAR sensor mounted on the roof of the vehicle. Powered by the DiPilot 300 system with a single Nvidia Orin X chip, supporting up to 300 TOPS of computing power. Supports NOA (Navigation on Autopilot) function in cities and highways.
- TianShen C: The most basic version, used on all mainstream BYD vehicles priced under 200,000 RMB. Includes 12 cameras (three front-view behind the windshield, five panoramic, and four surround-view), five mmWave radars for 360-degree perception, and 12 ultrasonic radar sensors. Powered by the DiPilot 100 system with either a single Nvidia Drive Orin N chip or Horizon Robotics Journey 5 chip, supporting up to 100 trillion operations per second (TOPS) of computing power. Supports high-speed NOA (Navigation on Autopilot) function in highways.

Every BYD car equipped with the TianShen system will also feature the Xuanji architecture, which was launched in January 2024. The architecture includes a central processor, cloud AI, vehicle-side AI, Internet of Vehicles, 5G network, satellite network, sensors chain, control chain, data chain, and mechanical chain. The architecture will also be integrated with the DeepSeek R1 large model to enhance AI capabilities in both the vehicle and the cloud.

In some models such as the Fangchengbao Bao 5, BYD offers the TianShen C driving assistance system alongside Huawei's more advanced solution, marketed as Qiankun ADS 3.0, that uses single 192-channel lidar.

=== Software and connectivity ===
BYD equipped most of its passenger cars with DiLink, a service ecosystem of technology and content developed independently by BYD and is primarily based on Android. The system is claimed to integrate in-vehicle network systems, cloud communication, AI, big data and other technologies. The user interface is inspired by mobile phones, supported by rotatable screens in BYD vehicles, and supports over-the-air updates. BYD also cooperated with Alibaba Cloud for its DiCloud AI cloud platform for the DiLink. Initial iterations of the DiLink (version 1.0) were used in vehicles such as the second-generation BYD Tang, and uses hardware comprising a 14.6-inch screen, 4G connection and a Qualcomm Snapdragon 625 chipset with 3 GB of RAM and 32 GB of storage.

The DiLink 4.0 was introduced in August 2021. The updated version supports 5G network, and feature a reworked, more intuitive user interface. The hardware for the DiLink 4.0 is known to be powered by a Qualcomm Snapdragon 690 chipset with 8 GB of RAM and 128 GB of storage.

One of the popular feature in the DiLink for the Chinese market is the inclusion of karaoke. BYD is one of the first brands in China to include karaoke in the in-car entertainment system, allowing occupants to sing through the optional or included DiLink microphone.

In 2021, BYD also introduced BYD OS alongside the e-Platform 3.0, which is an in-house operating system for battery electric vehicles that decouples software and hardware. This approach reduces manufacturing and maintenance costs while offering the possibility for other manufacturers using the platform to integrate their own software and hardware.

== Manufacturing facilities ==
=== China ===
BYD Auto's major passenger car manufacturing plants are located in Xi'an, Shaanxi; Shenzhen, Guangdong; Changsha, Hunan, Zhengzhou, Henan; Changzhou, Jiangsu; Jinan, Shandong; and Hefei, Anhui. The company also operates R&D centers in Shenzhen and Shanghai.

The Xi'an plant is BYD Auto's first and largest production base, which includes electric assembly, electric motor, and battery production. The first expansion of the plant was completed in September 2014, when the Xi'an BYD No. 2 Plant went operational. BYD added an electric bus plant in the complex in 2017, with an annual capacity of 5,000 units. Following the completion of the third phase development in September 2022, the current annual production capacity of the Xi'an production base is 900,000 vehicles. As of 2024, it is the largest single manufacturing company in the Shaanxi province. In 2024 alone, the plant produces more than 1 million vehicles.

In late 2012, the Changsha plant went operational with an annual production capacity of 300,000 vehicles. A second phase plant went operational in 2022, making the total production capacity in Changsha reach 300,000 vehicles annually.

BYD Auto started construction of its largest plant in Hefei, Anhui in July 2021, which started operations in June 2022. It was built in three phases with final annual capacity of 1.32 million vehicles.

In March 2024, the Ministry of Industry and Information Technology approved BYD's plan to move its passenger vehicle factory in Pingshan, Shenzhen to the Shenzhen-Shantou Special Cooperation Zone in Shantou, Guangdong, 60 km (37 mi) east of Shenzhen.

As of 2024, BYD's annual vehicle production capacity in China has reached 5.82 million vehicles.

BYD vehicle manufacturing plants in China
Subsidiary	Plant	Location	Start of production	Annual capacity	Products	Models produced (2025)
BYD Auto Co., Ltd.	Xi'an Plant (initially acquired from Xi'an Qinchuan Automobile)	Xi'an, Shaanxi	2003 (under BYD)	900,000 vehicles	Passenger vehicles; EV buses; Engines	List Passenger vehicles: Frigate 07 (2022–present); Qin EV (2019–present); Qin Plus DM-i (2021–present); Qin Plus EV (2021–present); Sealion 05 DM-i (2024–present); Sealion 05 EV (2025–present); Sealion 07 EV (2024–present); Seal (2022–present); Seagull (2023–present); Song Plus DM-i (2020–present); Song Plus EV (2020–present); Song Pro DM-i (2019–present); Denza D9 (2022–present); Fangchengbao Tai 3 (2025–present); Yangwang U8 (2023–present)
BYD Auto Co., Ltd.	Changzhou Branch	Changzhou, Jiangsu	2022	400,000 vehicles	Passenger vehicles	List Passenger vehicles: Fangchengbao Tai 3 (2025–present); Seagull (2023–present); Seal (2022–present); Tang L DM (2025–present); Tang L EV (2025–present); Yuan Plus (2021–present); Sealion 07 DM-i (2025–present); Sealion 07 EV (2024–present); Racco (2026–present)
BYD Auto Industry Co., Ltd.	Changsha Branch	Yuhua District, Changsha, Hunan	2012	600,000 vehicles	Passenger vehicles; EV buses; EV trucks; Traction motor	List Passenger vehicles: D1 (2020–present); Destroyer 05 (2022–present); Dolphin (2021–present); e2 (2019–present); e7 (2024–present); e9 (2021–present); Seal 05 DM-i (2025–present); Seal 06 GT (2024–present); Seal 06 DM-i (2024–present); Seal 07 DM-i (2023–present); Song L DM-i (2024–present); Song L EV (2023–present); Tang DM (2018–present); Tang EV (2018–present); Yuan Pro (2021–present); Yuan Plus (2021–present); Yuan Up (2024–present)
BYD Auto Industry Co., Ltd.	Chengde Branch	Chengde, Hebei			EV buses	
BYD Auto Industry Co., Ltd.	Dalian Branch	Dalian, Liaoning			Large EV buses	
BYD Auto Industry Co., Ltd.	Guilin Branch	Guilin, Guangxi			EV buses	
BYD Auto Industry Co., Ltd.	Hangzhou Branch	Hangzhou, Zhejiang			EV buses	
BYD Auto Industry Co., Ltd.	Hefei Branch	Changfeng, Hefei, Anhui	2022	1,320,000 vehicles		List Passenger vehicles: Destroyer 05 (2022–present); Qin Plus DM-i (2022–present); Qin L DM-i (2024–present); Qin L EV (2025–present); Song L EV (2023–present); Song Pro DM-i (2022–present); Seal 07 DM-i (2023–present); Seal 05 DM-i (2025–present); Seal 06 GT (2024–present); Seal 06 DM-i (2024–present); Seal 07 DM-i (2023–present); Yuan Up (2024–present); Xia (2025–present)
BYD Auto Industry Co., Ltd.	Huaian Branch	Huai'an, Jiangsu			EV light trucks; EV medium and heavy trucks	
BYD Auto Industry Co., Ltd.	Jinan Branch	Jinan, Shandong	2022	300,000 vehicles	Passenger vehicles	List Passenger vehicles: Denza N7 (2023–present); Denza N9 (2025–present); Dolphin (2023–present); Seal 05 DM-i (2025–present); Seal 06 DM-i (2024–present); Seal 06 GT (2024–present); Seal 07 DM-i (2024–present); Song Pro (2022–present); Yuan Up / Atto 2 (2024–present)
BYD Auto Industry Co., Ltd.	Nanjing Branch	Lishui, Nanjing, Jiangsu			EV buses	
BYD Auto Industry Co., Ltd.	Qingdao Branch	Chengyang District, Qingdao, Shandong			EV buses	
BYD Auto Industry Co., Ltd.	Shanwei Branch	Luhe, Shanwei, Guangdong			EV buses	
BYD Auto Industry Co., Ltd.	Shenzhen Plant	Longgang District, Shenzhen, Guangdong		350,000 vehicles	Passenger vehicles; Engines; Traction motor; LFP battery cells; Lithium-ion battery pack	List Passenger vehicles: Denza Z9 (2024–present); Dolphin (2021–present); Fangchengbao Bao 5 (2023–present); Fangchengbao Bao 8 (2024–present); Han DM (2020–present); Han EV (2020–present); Han L DM (2025–present); Han L EV (2025–present); M6 / eMax 7 (2024–present); Seal 05 DM-i (2025–present); Seal 07 DM-i (2024–present); Song L DM-i (2023–present); Song L EV (2023–present); Tang L DM (2025–present); Tang L EV (2025–present); Yangwang U7 (2025–present); Yangwang U9 (2024–present)
BYD Auto Industry Co., Ltd.	Taiyuan Branch	Taiyuan, Shanxi			EV buses	
BYD Auto Industry Co., Ltd.	Wuhan Branch	Huangpi District, Wuhan, Hubei			EV buses	
BYD Auto Industry Co., Ltd.	Yinchuan Branch	Yinchuan, Ningxia			EV buses	
BYD Auto Industry Co., Ltd.	Zhengzhou Branch	Zhengzhou, Henan	2023	400,000 vehicles	Passenger vehicles	List Passenger vehicles: Fangchengbao Bao 5 (2023–present); Fangchengbao Bao 8 (2024–present); Seal DM-i (2023–present); Seal 06 GT (2024–present); Seal 06 DM-i (2024–present); Seal 07 DM-i (2024–present); Shark (2024–present); Song L DM-i (2024–present); Song Pro DM-i (2023–present)
Fuzhou BYD Industrial Co., Ltd.(acquired from Dorcen)		Fuzhou, Jiangxi	2023 (under BYD)	200,000 vehicles	Passenger vehicles	List Passenger vehicles: e2 (2023–present); e3 (2023–present); Yuan Pro (2023–present)
Hangzhou Xihu BYD New Energy Vehicle Co., Ltd.		Yuhang District, Hangzhou, Zhejiang			EV special vehicles	
Guangzhou GAC BYD New Energy Passenger Vehicle Co., Ltd.		Conghua, Guangzhou, Guangdong	2015		EV buses	
Tianjin BYD Automobile Co., Ltd.		Wuqing, Tianjin			EV buses	
Xi'an Silver Bus Co., Ltd. (acquired from Xi'an Gaoke Group)		Xi'an, Shaanxi	2023 (under BYD)		EV buses	

=== Outside China ===
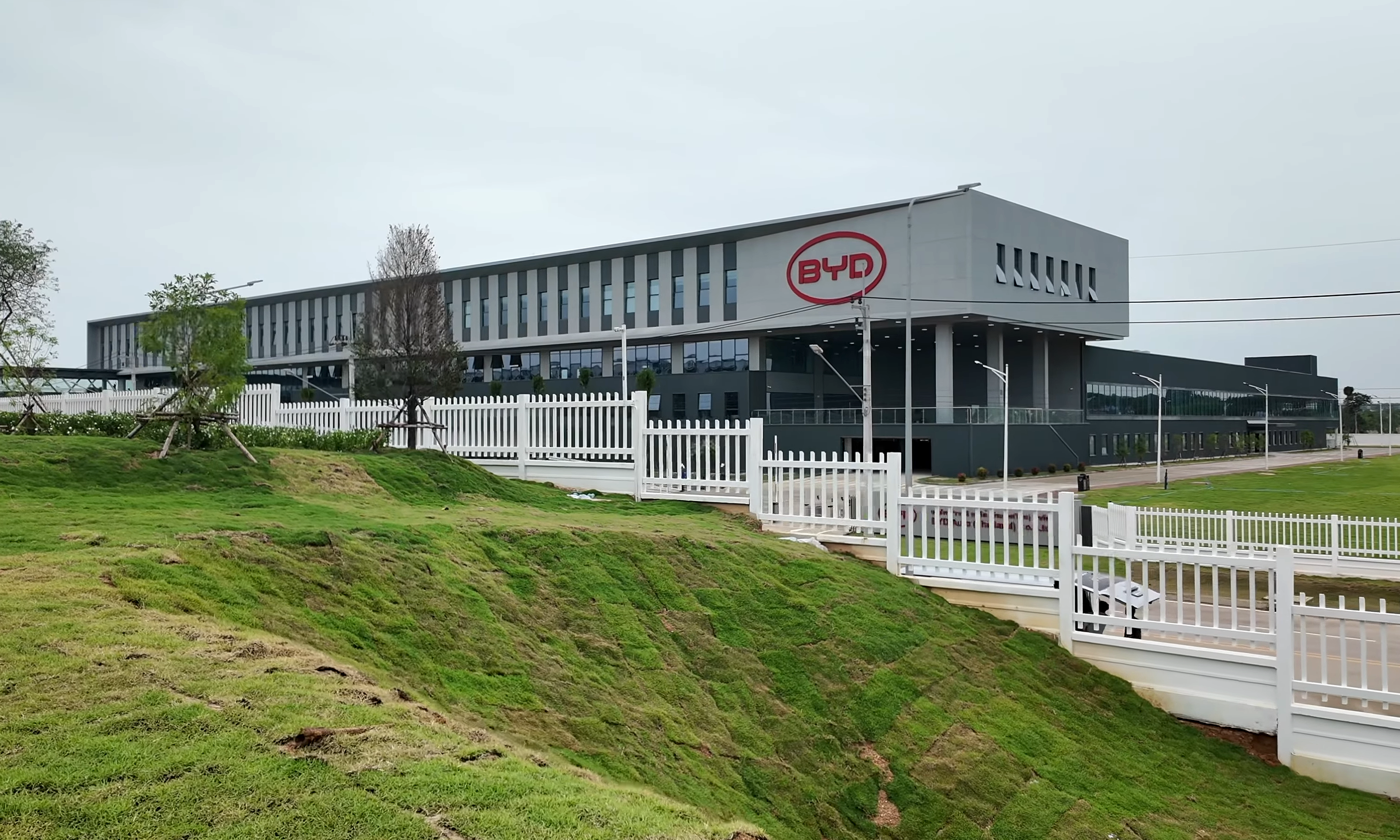
BYD Auto manufacturing plant in Rayong, Thailand

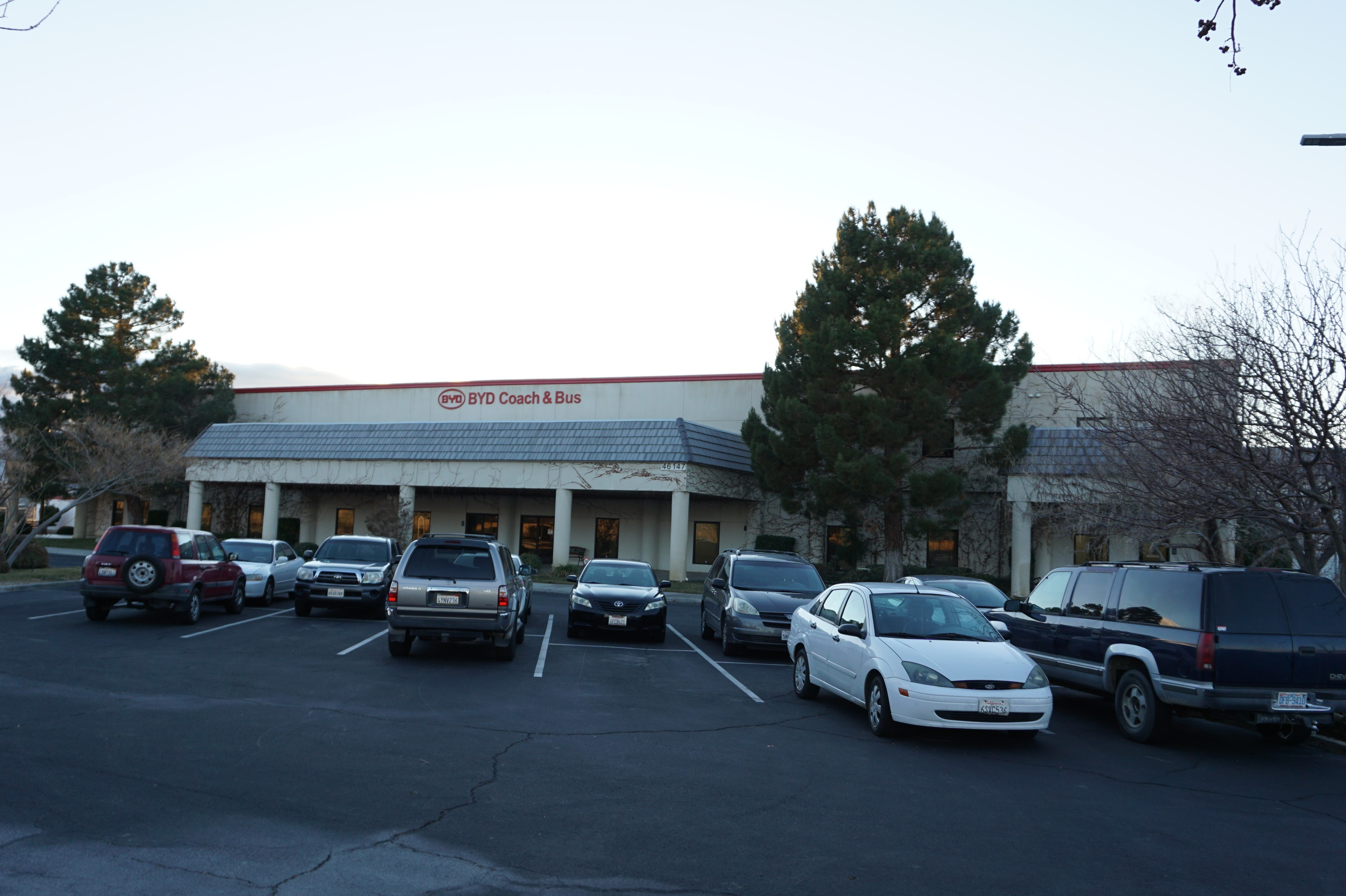
BYD Motors Inc. facility in Lancaster, California, in 2016

BYD opened a manufacturing plant for electric buses in Lancaster, California, US in May 2013. Another plant was inaugurated in Campinas, Brazil in 2015 for the production of electric buses. BYD also opened a bus plant in 2019 in Newmarket, Ontario, Canada.

BYD has a European electric bus assembly facility in Komárom, Hungary. The plant employed 300 people by the end of 2019, with a production capacity of up to 400 electric buses a year (and 600 chassis) on two shifts.. A significant expansion of the plant was announced in 2025. The capacity will triple and will produce 1,250 electric buses and trucks annually.

In July 2023, BYD announced a US$620 million investment in Camaçari, Brazil to produce electric cars after acquiring Ford's former plant. In July 2024, BYD announced a US$1 billion investment in Turkey.

In Thailand, BYD operates a manufacturing plant located in the Eastern Economic Corridor (EEC) special zone in Rayong. Announced in 2023 and with an annual capacity of 150,000 vehicles, construction of the facility began in March of that year. The plant officially opened in July 2024, and was expected to employ 10,000 workers. On 12 November 2024, BYD Thailand rolled out its 10,000th electric vehicle, just four months after the manufacturing plant went operational.

On 28 April 2025, BYD broke ground on a passenger vehicle manufacturing plant located in Sihanoukville Special Economic Zone, Preah Sihanouk, Cambodia.

BYD vehicle manufacturing plants outside China
Country	Plant	City or Town	Subdivision	Start of production	Annual capacity	Products	Models produced (2025)
Brazil	BYD Auto Co., Ltd., Campinas Plant	Campinas	São Paulo	2018		EV bus chassis	
Brazil	BYD Auto do Brasil Ltda. Camaçari	Camaçari	Bahia	2025	150,000 vehicles	Passenger vehicles	Dolphin Mini (2025–present); Song Pro DM-i (2025–present); King DM-i (2025–present); Mako (2026–present)
Cambodia	BYD Cambodia Co., Ltd.	Sihanoukville	Preah Sihanouk	2025	10,000 vehicles	Passenger vehicles	Sealion 5 (2025–present)
Hungary	BYD Electric Bus & Truck Hungary Kft	Komárom	Komárom-Esztergom			EV buses; EV bus chassis	
Hungary	BYD Auto, Szeged (tentative name)	Szeged	Csongrád-Csanád	2026	150,000 vehicles	Passenger vehicles	Dolphin Surf (2026–present); Atto 2 (2026–present)
India	BYD India Pvt. Ltd.	Sriperumbudur	Tamil Nadu			Passenger vehicles; EV bus chassis	Atto 3 (2022–present)
Indonesia	PT BYD Auto Indonesia	Subang	West Java	2026	150,000 vehicles	Passenger vehicles	Atto 1 (2026–present); M6 (2026–present); Danza D9 (2026–present); Titan 7 (2026–present); Atto 2 (2027–present)
Thailand	BYD Auto (Thailand) Co., Ltd.	Rayong	Rayong	2024	150,000 vehicles	Passenger vehicles	Atto 3 (2024–present); Dolphin (2024–present); Sealion 6 DM-i (2024–present); Seal 5 DM-i (2025–present); Sealion 5 DM-i (2026–present)
United States	BYD Motors Inc., Lancaster Plant	Lancaster	California	2014		EV buses; EV trucks	
Uzbekistan	BYD Uzbekistan Factory	Jizzakh	Jizzakh	2024	50,000 vehicles	Passenger vehicles	Chazor DM-i (2024–present); Song Plus DM-i (2024–present)

== Supply chain ==
BYD Auto is a vertically integrated company that claims to have the highest degree of vertical integration in the world, with over 70% of its vehicle components being supplied independently. It produces its own mouldings, production lines and equipment, and controls the supply chain for most components such as batteries, electric motors, and electronic controls, which significantly reduced its manufacturing costs and provides a competitive advantage in terms of profit margins. BYD established FinDreams, a brand encompassing five fully owned automotive component manufacturers that also supply parts to other automotive companies in 2020.

A teardown by investment bank UBS of the BYD Seal revealed that 75% of its components were made in-house. Its competition, the Tesla Model 3 only uses 46% of components that are made in-house in China. UBS concluded that this helped the Seal achieve a gross profit margin of 16%, compared to 14% for the made-in-China Model 3.

=== Shipping ===
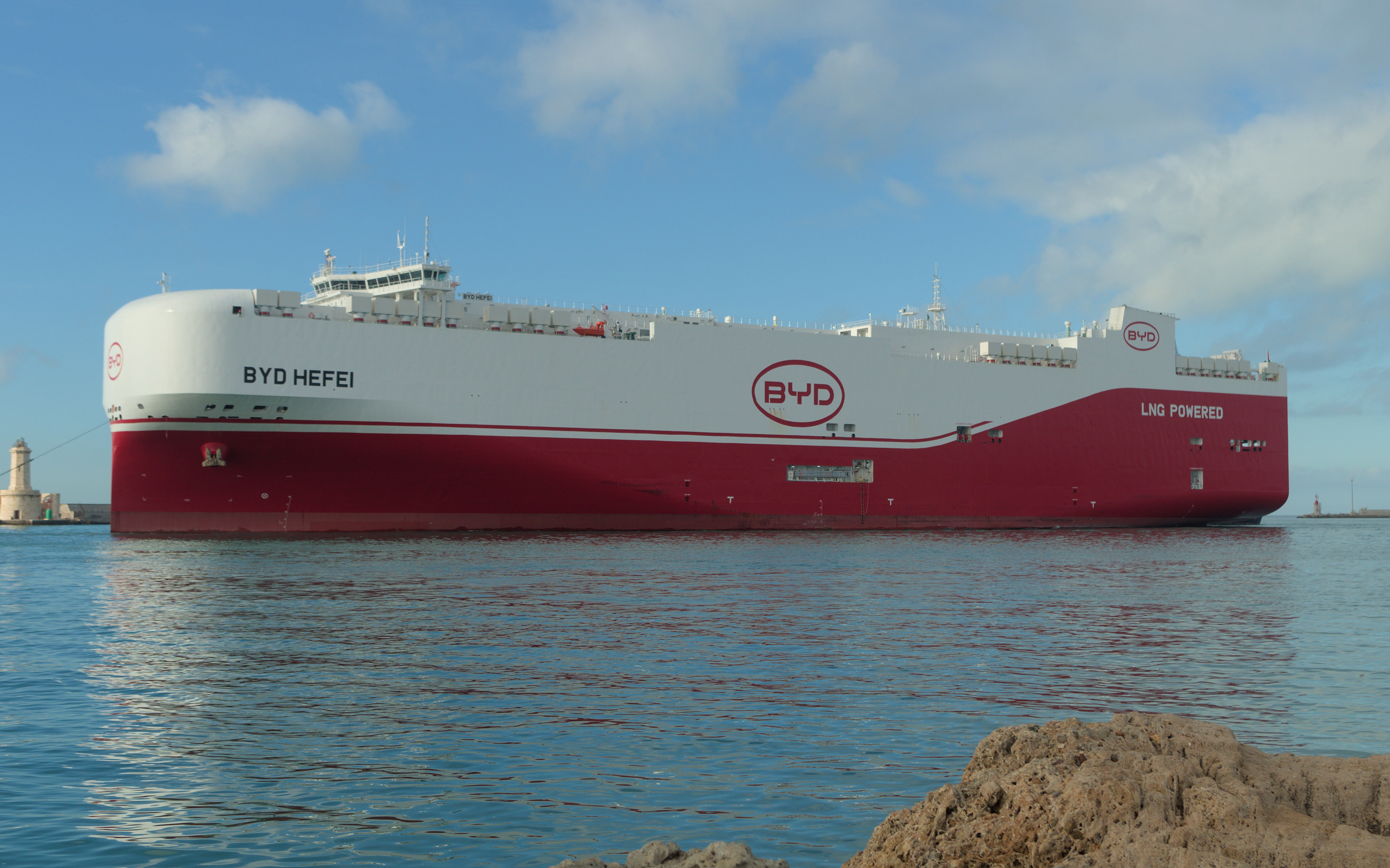
BYD Hefei cargo ship near Livorno, Italy

BYD Auto also operates its own shipping services to export its cars. On 9 January 2024, BYD's first roll-on/roll-off cargo ship, named "BYD Explorer No.1", was delivered and left the construction base in Longkou, Shandong province. The 200 m (660 ft)-long ship arrived at Yantai Port on the same day, before heading to Shenzhen for loading cars for exporting to Europe. According to China International Marine Containers (CIMC), the ship was built by Yantai CIMC Raffles Shipyard for the international ship management company Zodiac Maritime, and was leased to BYD as the first of its "sea shipping fleet", with a loading capacity of 7,000 vehicles.

The company's first directly owned ship, the BYD Hefei, was completed in September 2024 and commenced its first voyage to Europe on 7 January 2025. Its third ship is the BYD Changzhou, which was launched in October 2024 and officially went into operation for European deliveries in December 2024. In the spring of 2025, BYD introduced its larger 9,200-vehicle capacity carriers, starting with the BYD Shenzhen, which was officially delivered on 22 April 2025, and kicked off its maiden voyage to Brazil on April 27. Shortly after, the BYD Xi'an, initially launched on 2 April 2025, started its first voyage to Europe on June 21, 2025. The BYD Changsha was officially delivered on 24 June 2025, and made its maiden departure to Taicang on 27 June. The 7,000-vehicle BYD Zhengzhou was named and delivered on 16 July 2025, before setting sail for Southeast Asia on 18 July. The addition of the BYD Jinan, which was delivered on 26 September 2025, completes the initial eight-ship fleet and increased BYD's total maritime export capacity to over one million vehicles annually.

List of BYD cargo ships
Ship name	Capacity (vehicles)	Note
BYD Explorer No. 1	7,000	Owner: Zodiac Maritime; Charter: BYD
BYD Hefei	7,000	Owner: BYD; direct commissions for fleet
BYD Changzhou	7,000	Owner: BYD; direct commissions for fleet
BYD Zhengzhou	7,000	Owner: BYD; direct commissions for fleet
BYD Shenzhen	9,200	Owner: BYD; direct commissions for fleet
BYD Xi'an	7,000	Owner: BYD; direct commissions for fleet
BYD Changsha	9,200	Owner: BYD; direct commissions for fleet
BYD Jinan	9,200	Owner: BYD; direct commissions for fleet

== Other facilities ==
=== Design centre ===
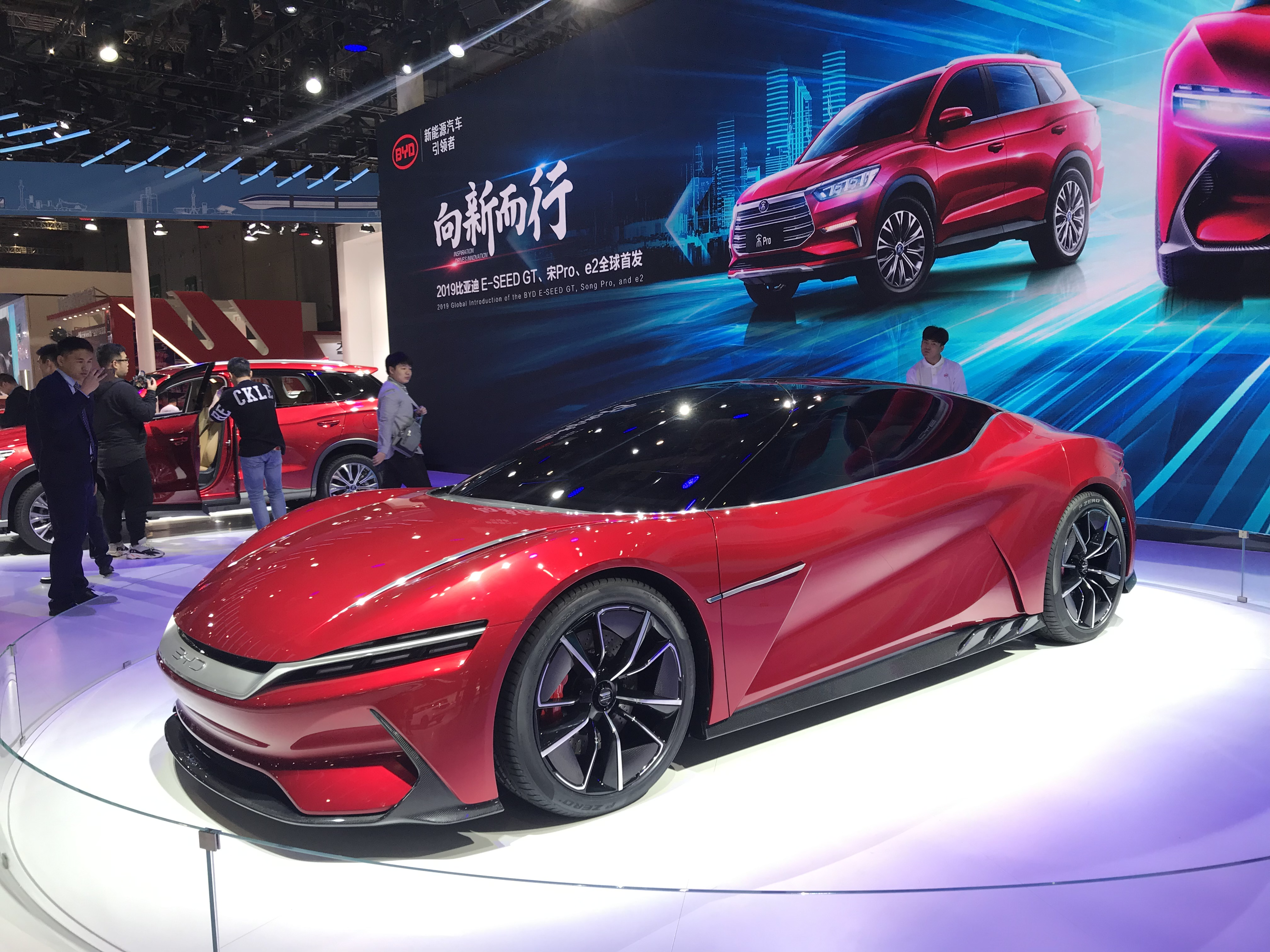
BYD E-Seed GT concept car, 2019

In 2019, BYD launched its global design centre in Shenzhen, China. It is a 12,600-square-meter facility led by European car designers, led by Global Design director Wolfgang Egger, BYD Global Exterior Design director JuanMa Lopez and Global Interior Design director Michele Jauch-Paganetti.

The design centre initially housed 200 designers, which has increased to 600 designers by 2023. Its infrastructure includes digital design, physical modeling, and virtual reality evaluation, supported by a 6,000-square-meter clay modeling area equipped with high-precision five-axis processing machinery capable of milling a full-scale clay model in five days. Automated clay-cutting tools reduce physical design modification times from several weeks to less than 24 hours, while a micro-spacing 1.2-millimeter LED display system enables full-scale virtual vehicle comparisons and ergonomic validations.

In April 2019, the first joint effort from the team, the E-Seed GT concept car was showcased at the Auto Shanghai in April 2019. The design concept reflected the lines of the traditional Chinese dragon.

=== Zhengzhou All-Terrain Circuit ===
In August 2025, BYD opened an All-Terrain Circuit in Zhengzhou, China, designed specifically for testing and driving new energy vehicles. The facility is open for public, serving as a venue for track racing, professional driver training, and vehicle demonstrations. The circuit features eight specialised zones, including a Guinness World Records-certified indoor sand dune, a 70-meter wading pool for amphibious maneuvers, and a 1,758-meter paved race track. Handling and stability systems are tested on a low-friction circular track and a kick-plate designed to simulate icy conditions and sudden loss of traction. The facility also includes a 15,300-square-meter dynamic paddock for standardized maneuvers such as the moose test and automated parking, a 27-scenario off-road park for assessing all-wheel-drive capabilities, and a dedicated outdoor camping area.

Alongside the opening, BYD and the Federation of Automobile and Motorcycle Sports of China (CAMF) announced the "New Track Scheme," a collaborative program aiming to train 100 professional racers and expand motorsport engagement.

BYD plans to open additional circuits in Hefei and Shaoxing. The upcoming Shaoxing facility will feature a 2,000-acre off-road testing area situated at an altitude of 500 meters.

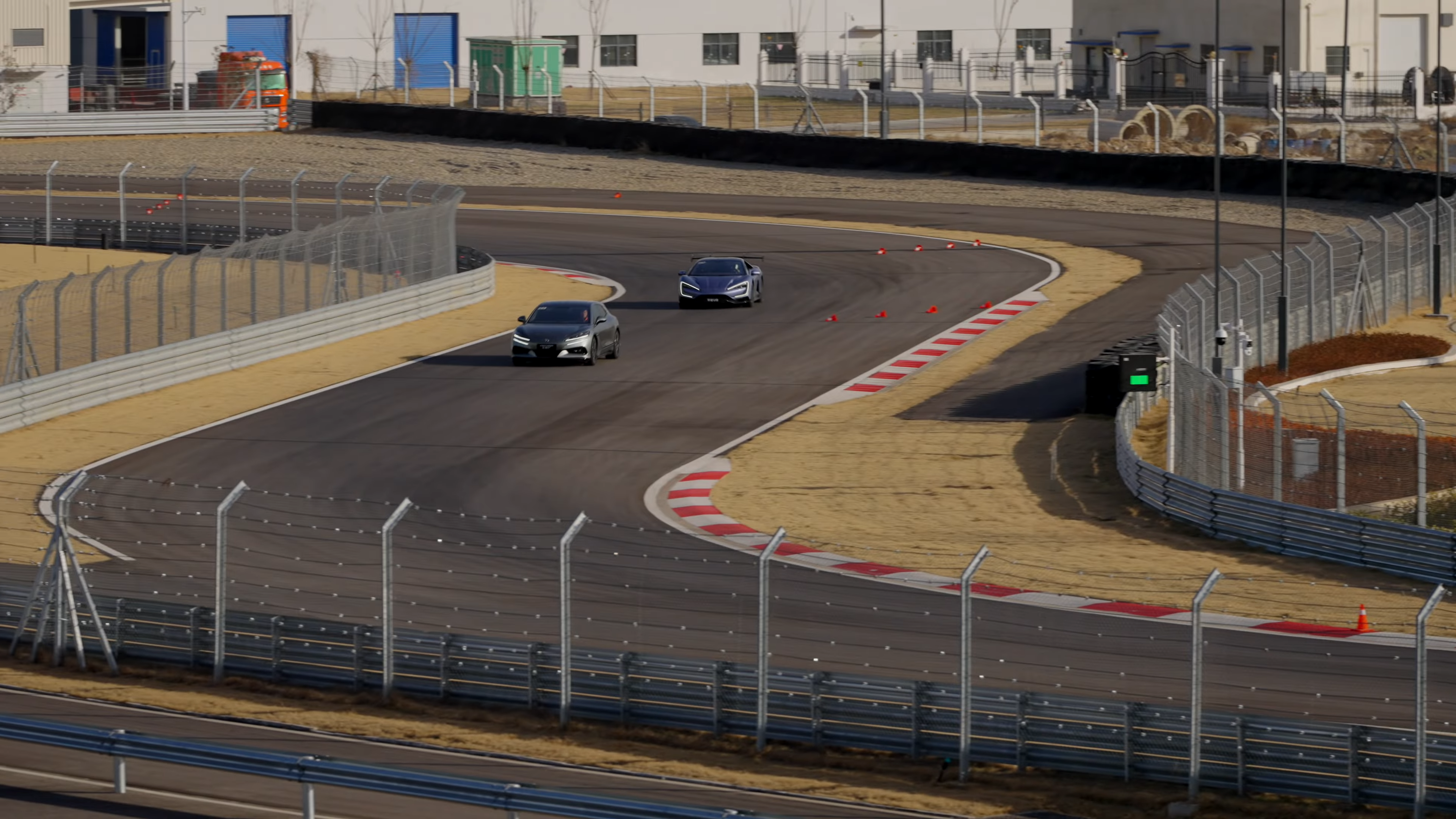
Race track

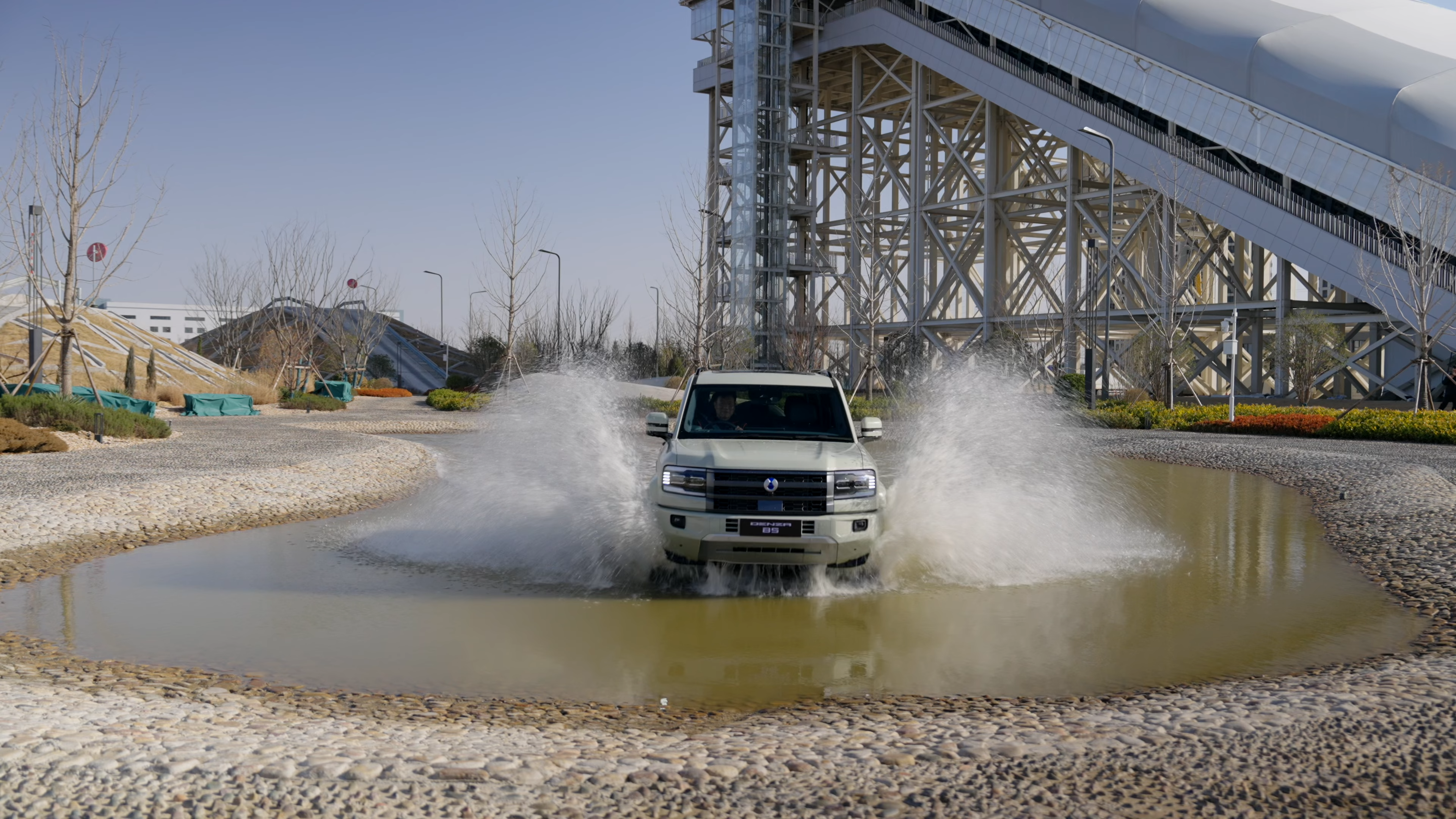
Off-road park

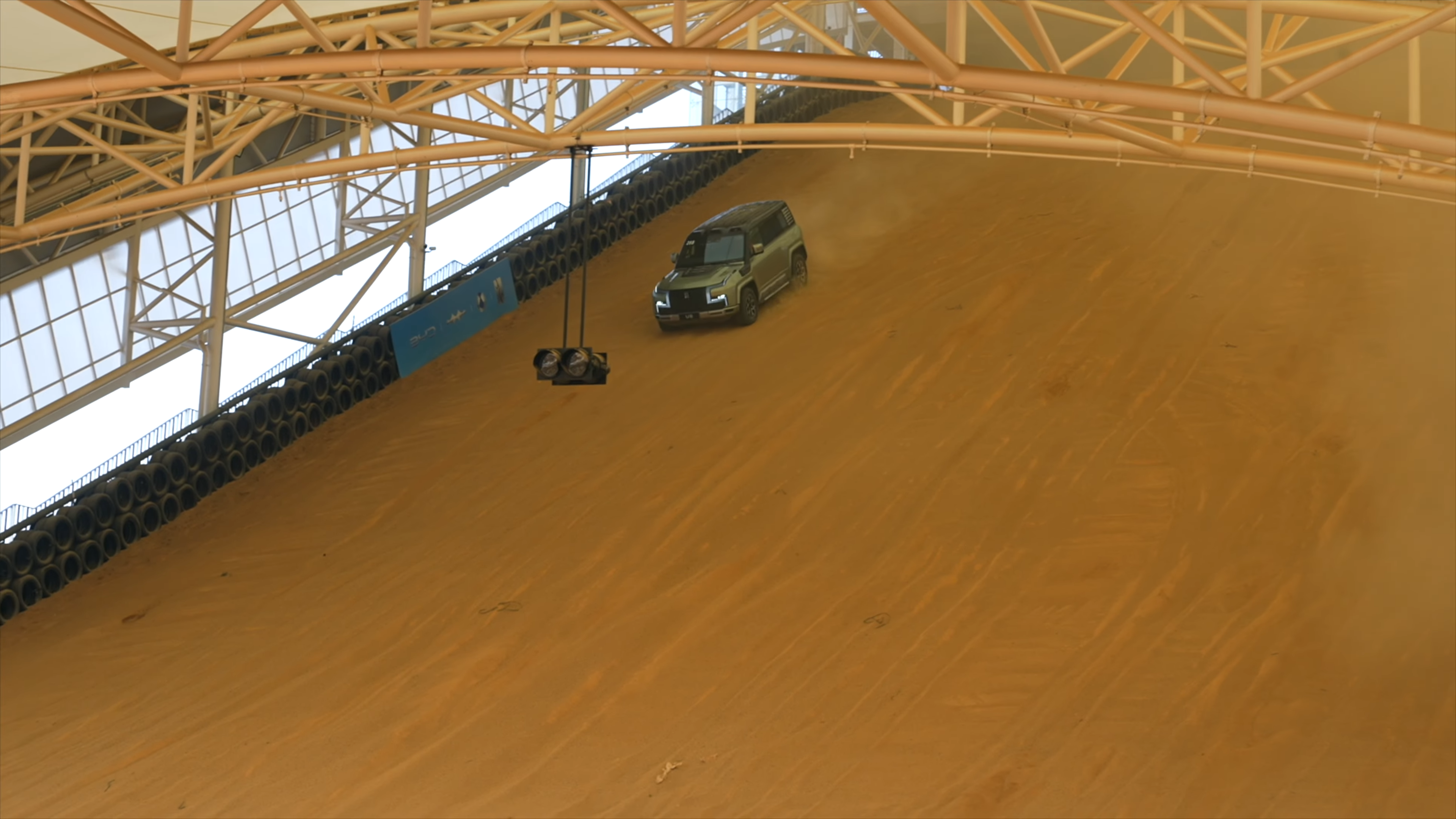
Sand incline

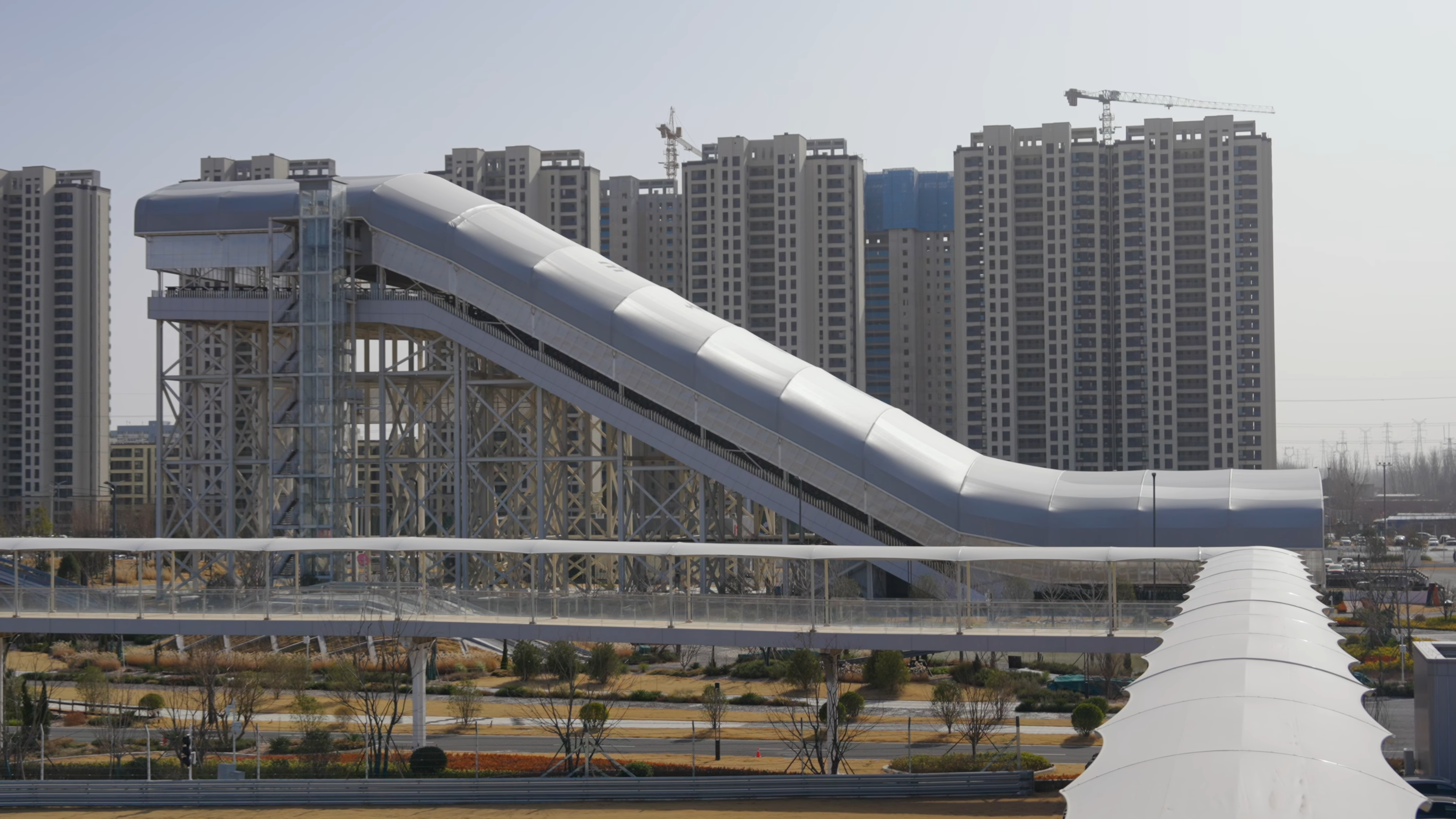
Sand incline structure from outside

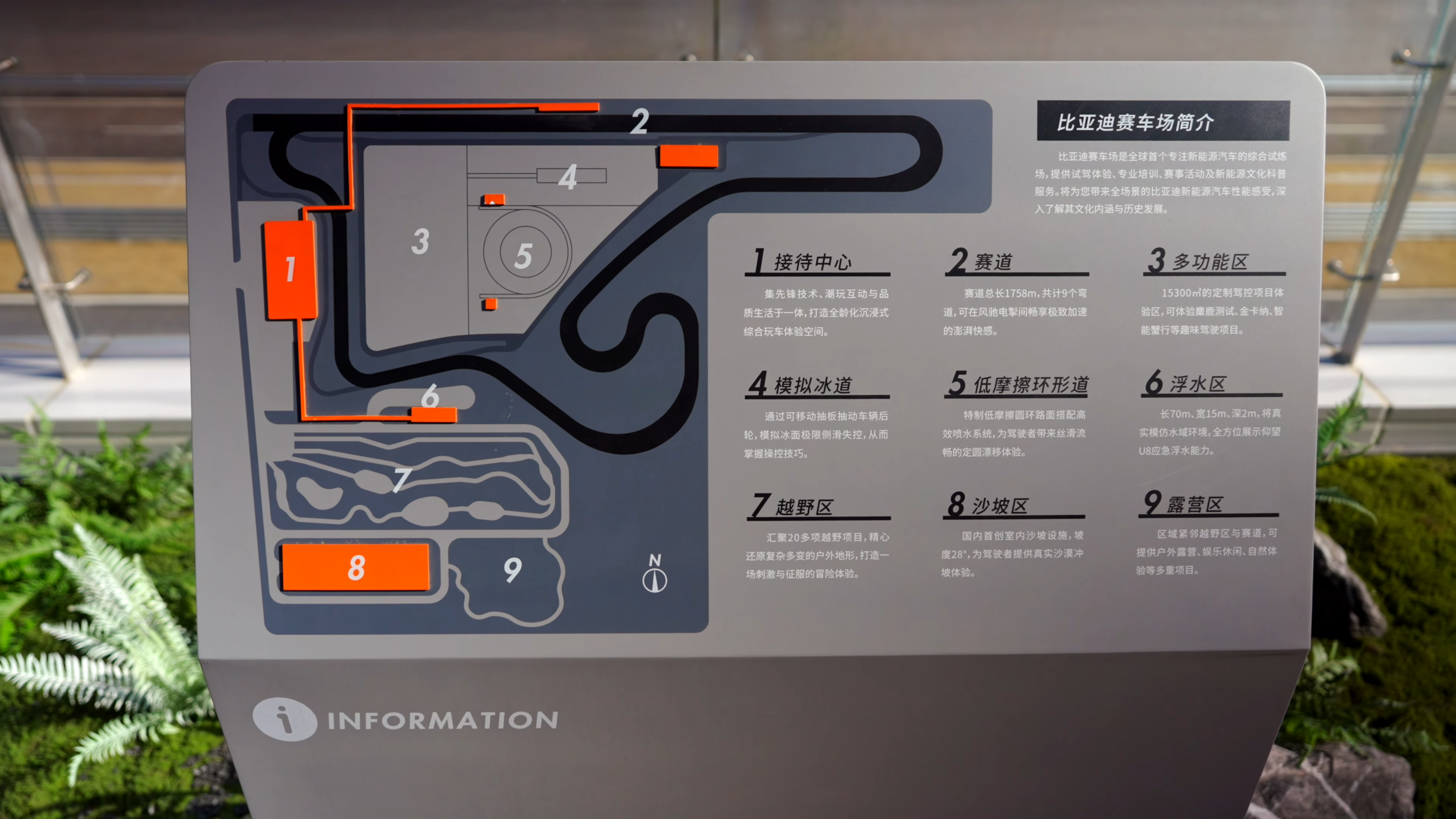
BYD Zhengzhou All-Terrain Circuit map

== Services ==
=== Vehicle insurance ===
In May 2023, BYD Auto was approved to acquire a 100% stake in Yi'an P&C Insurance Co., Ltd., renamed it, and transformed it into its own insurance company for BYD vehicles. In June 2024, BYD Property & Casualty Insurance opened for registrations, and announced the expansion of its car insurance services in 7 major provinces in China. The company has regulatory approval to adjust premium rates independently, addressing high premiums and profitability issues in the new energy vehicle insurance market.

== Partnerships and joint ventures ==
=== Toyota joint venture ===
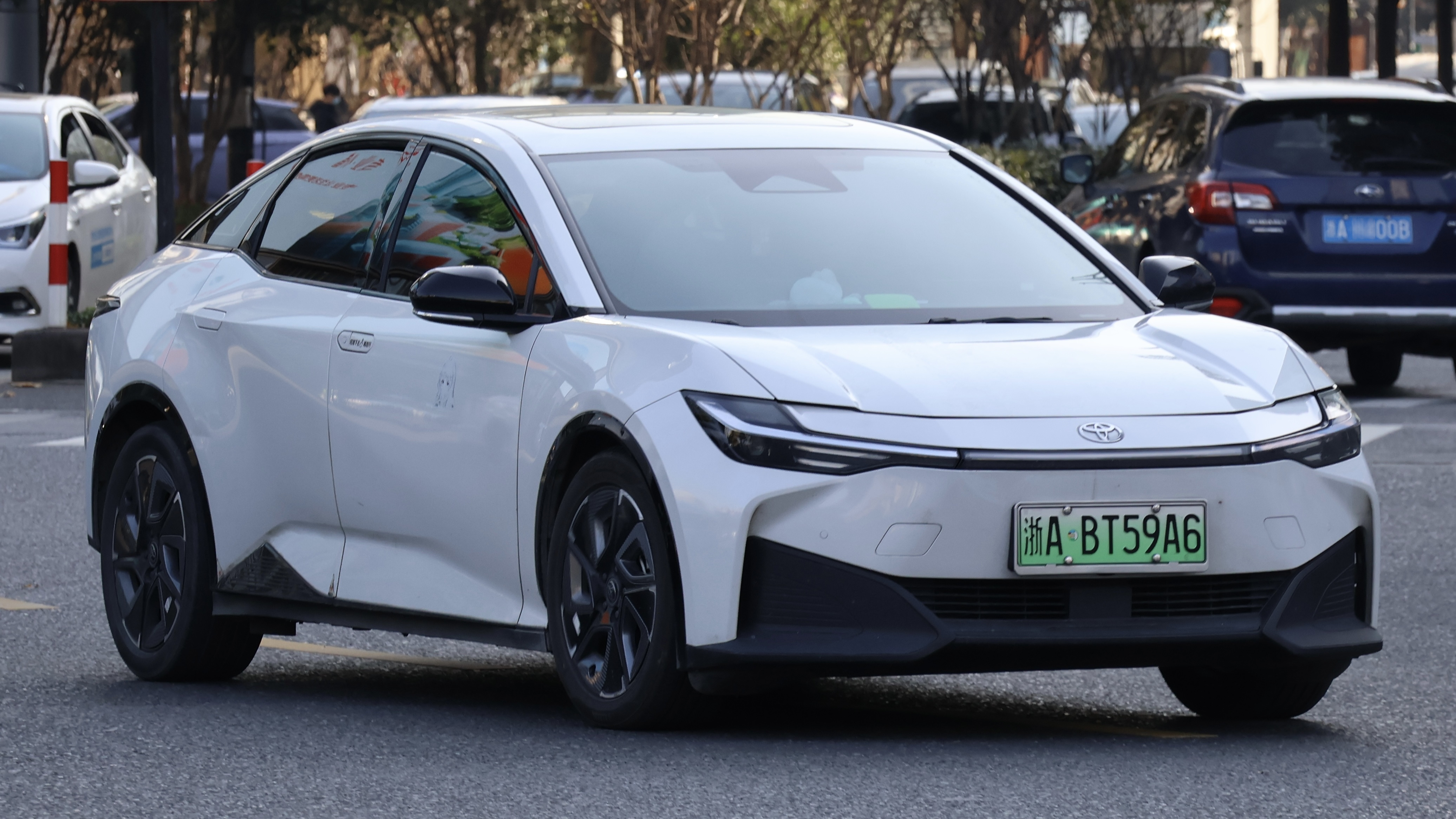
The Toyota bZ3, jointly developed between Toyota and BYD

BYD and Toyota formed a joint venture called BYD Toyota EV Technology Co., Ltd. (BTET), which was formalised in April 2020 and headquartered in Shenzhen, China. It was established with a focus on the research and development of battery electric vehicles. The first product conceived by the joint venture is the Toyota bZ3, a Chinese market battery electric sedan manufactured by FAW Toyota, followed by the Toyota bZ5 crossover SUV.

=== Hino Motors joint venture ===
In October 2020, BYD Auto Industry Co., Ltd. signed an agreement with Japanese truck and bus manufacturer Hino Motors to establish a joint venture for commercial battery electric vehicle development. The joint venture planned to introduce vehicles under the Hino brand by 2025.

In February 2023, Hino Motors halted sales of compact electric buses in Japan supplied by BYD due to the presence of hexavalent chromium, a carcinogenic chemical banned under Japanese industry guidelines. The affected model is the Hino Poncho Z EV. Hino was unable to negotiate with BYD to build the bus without using the chemical, while BYD Japan claims that the buses "meet all required laws and standards".

=== KG Mobility ===
In December 2021, BYD via its battery subsidiary FinDreams Industry Co., Ltd. signed a memorandum of understanding with SsangYong Motor to develop car batteries and produce battery packs for SsangYong's upcoming models, including its first electric vehicle, the U100, planned for mass production from 2023.

In November 2023, the company, by then renamed KG Mobility (KGM), signed an expanded next-generation hybrid system agreement with BYD. The agreement covered battery pack production at a new facility in Changwon, South Korea, and the joint development of full hybrid and plug-in hybrid systems beginning with a Torres-based hybrid model. The Torres EVX battery electric SUV, introduced in 2023, uses a BYD Blade battery pack.

In January 2026, KGM introduced its first hybrid models, the Torres Hybrid and Actyon Hybrid, both fitted with a Dual Tech Hybrid system developed in collaboration with BYD and derived from BYD's plug-in hybrid technology. It is adapted as a conventional full hybrid requiring no external charging. The system pairs a newly developed 1.5-litre turbocharged Miller cycle petrol engine with a P1 and P3 dual motor architecture, and a 1.83 kWh battery within a BYD-derived e-DHT (electrified Dual Hybrid Transmission).

=== GAC BYD ===
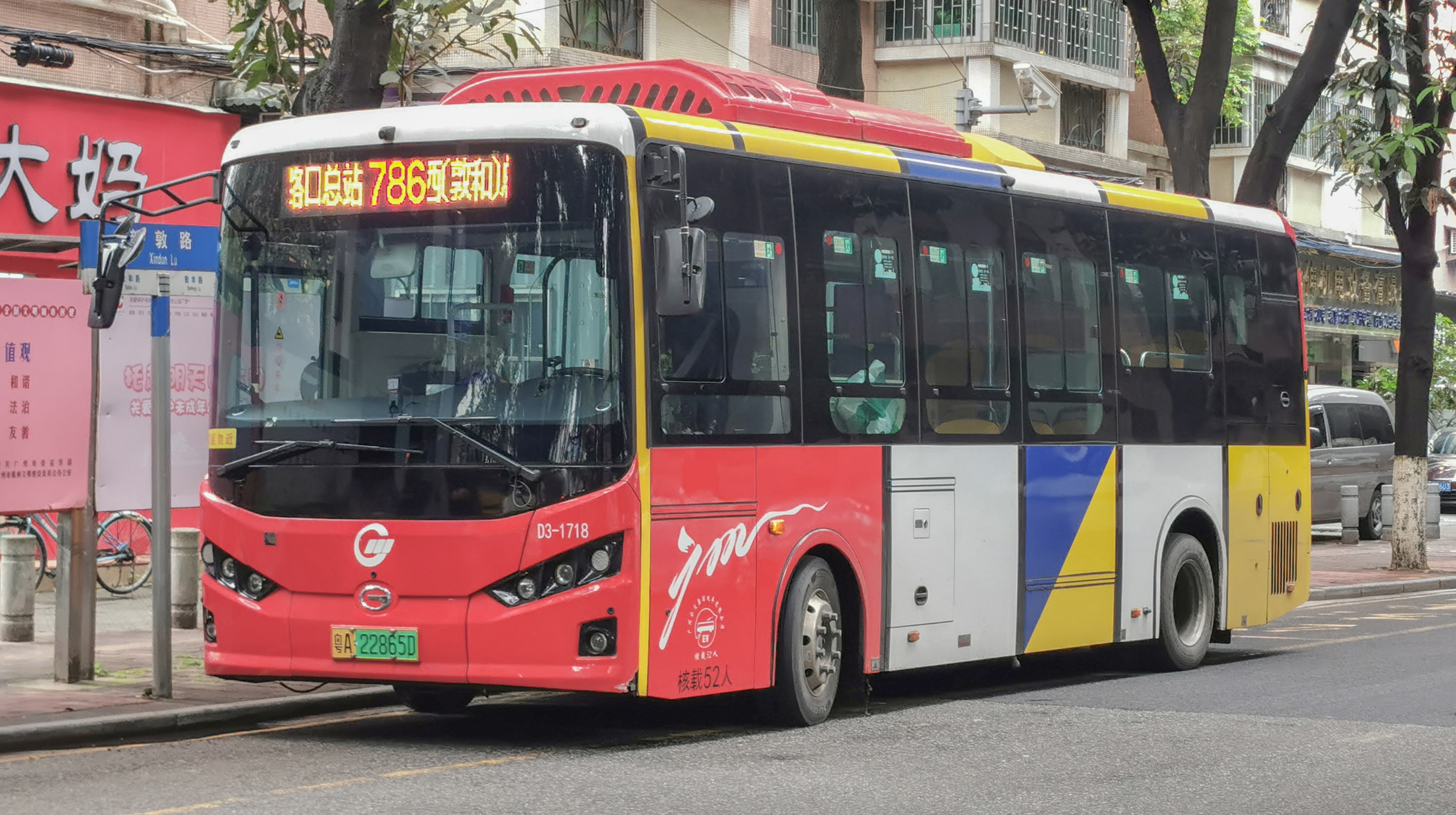
Guangzhou GZ6850HZEV1 (K7G) bus built by GAC BYD

In August 2014, BYD and GAC Group established a joint venture called Guangzhou GAC BYD New Energy Bus Co., Ltd. to produce electric buses in Guangzhou, the city where GAC is based. BYD holds a 51 percent stake while GAC held 49 percent. The joint venture mainly supplies buses to the local bus operator Guangzhou Bus Group.

=== Alexander Dennis ===
In 2015, BYD partnered with Alexander Dennis to produce all-electric buses for the British market, including London's first all-electric double-decker. Alexander Dennis built their first-generation Enviro200EV single-deck and Enviro400EV double-deck products on BYD's chassis. By 2023, the partnership had produced 1,500 buses.

=== Songsan Motor ===
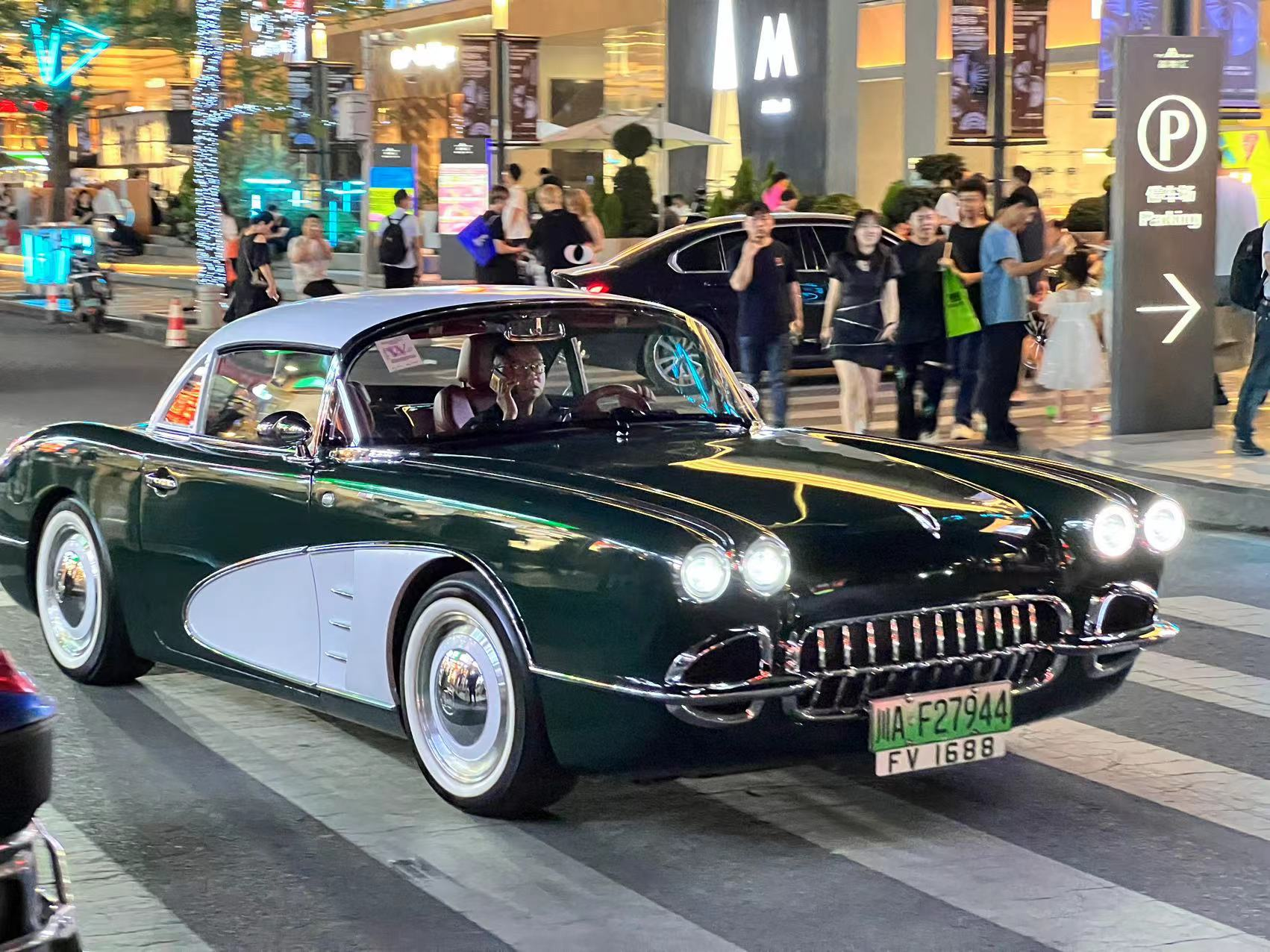
Songsan SS Dolphin

A small Chinese motorcycle manufacturer Songsan Motor contracted BYD to produce retro-styled cars, as the company does not have a production license. Its first vehicle, the Songsan SS Dolphin (unrelated to the BYD Dolphin) was introduced in 2019 using Chevrolet Corvette C1 as a design inspiration. It is based on BYD's platform and powered by a plug-in hybrid powertrain. As legally required, the car wears BYD badges alongside Songsan Motor logo. As of 2023, deliveries to customers have not started yet. Songsan sued BYD in September 2023 due to alleged contract disputes and fraudulent environmental certifications, an allegation that was denied by BYD.

== Motorsport ==
The Shark 6 competed and won the Frontera Aventura 2025 Rally in the Dominican Republic in March 2025. In 2026, BYD are officially in talks with the FIA and opened their interest to start as a new team in F1.

== Lawsuits and controversies ==
=== Poor construction labour conditions ===
==== Brazil ====
In December 2024, Brazilian authorities announced that they had found 163 Chinese nationals working in "slavery-like conditions" building a BYD plant in Bahia. Brazilian labour authorities stated that they were victims of human trafficking. Brazil's Ministry of Justice announced it would revoke residence permits for Chinese workers at the BYD factory if prosecutors confirm irregularities. Jinjiang Group, the contractor for BYD, claimed that Brazilian authorities' characterization of its employees as "enslaved" was "inaccurate" and due to "translation errors". The statement was shared by Li Yunfei, BYD's branding and public relations general manager, who alleged efforts by "foreign forces" to damage the reputation of Chinese brands. Both Jinjiang Group and BYD responded by housing the 163 workers in hotels until a deal to end their contracts is reached. Brazil's Ministry of Foreign Affairs announced that it had stopped issuing temporary work visas for BYD. In May 2025, Brazilian prosecutors filed a lawsuit against BYD.

==== Hungary ====
According to the investigation conducted by China Labor Watch, BYD’s factory development in Szeged, Hungary, also sees poor working conditions. Thousands of workers are required to work every day of the week, often in shifts exceeding 12 hours. Part of the workers' wages have been withheld by the company, deterring the workers from resigning on their own. Many workers went to Hungary without proper visas, making them vulnerable to exploitation.

=== Marketing and public relations ===
==== Sponsorship fraud case ====
In April 2018, British football team Arsenal F.C. announced BYD as its sponsorship partner. In July 2018, the sponsorship agreement was revealed as fraudulent after BYD claimed the person who signed a sponsorship deal with the club was not authorised to do so. BYD claims that Shanghai police detained a woman who was acting as the marketing manager on suspicion of contract fraud and forging business seals. The individual had signed numerous contracts with advertising agencies, but she has never been an employee of BYD.

==== Legal actions against online influencers ====
In China, BYD has taken legal action towards online bloggers and social media users. In July 2023, BYD formally sued a Sina Weibo user, Longzhu-JiChe, alleging that they had been posting false information about BYD. The company demanded a CN¥5 million compensation. In April 2024, BYD filed a lawsuit against a Chinese blogger, Huang, that posted a false claim in social media in January 2023 that BYD instructed its employees to organise consumers to "defend their rights against Tesla". The court ruled that Huang must publish a statement of apology and compensate BYD for losses. In May 2024, BYD filed another lawsuit against a Chinese blogger Yao Qiang, demanding that he make a public apology and pay a compensation of CN¥5 million. The blogger claimed the Fangchengbao Bao 5 had a poor fuel consumption of around 18 l/100 km (5.6 km/l; 13 mpg_{‑US}). Internet users found traffic violations in the test drive video and reported it to the police. Investigation by BYD revealed that the vehicle was driven abnormally and aggressively.

In mid-2024, following the lead of other automakers and in line with the Ministry of Public Security's "Regulations on the Governance of Online Violence Information," BYD in China introduced a bounty program to report evidence of internet "black campaigns" conducted by individuals, public relations firms, or rival car companies. Rewards range from 200,000 to 5 million yuan, with confidentiality guaranteed for those who provide information. In June 2025, BYD's Legal Department announced that it is taking legal action against 37 online influencer accounts and has placed an additional 126 accounts under internal monitoring for alleged disinformation and damaging content.

By May 2026, based on public court filings and company statements verified by CarNewsChina, BYD ranked first among Chinese automakers by total disclosed claim value, having pursued legal action against at least seven blogger accounts with cumulative claims totalling CN¥6,926,300 (approximately US$1.02 million). The largest individual case involved the blogger account "Long Ge Jiang Dian Che", operated by a repair-shop content creator surnamed Liu, whose posts discussed BYD's Blade Battery and hybrid systems; a second-instance court ruling in May 2026 ordered compensation of CN¥2 million and found that several disputed claims constituted commercial defamation and unfair competition. Other Chinese automakers including AITO (HIMA), Nio, and Xpeng have pursued similar proceedings.

=== Price reduction controversies ===
==== China ====
BYD has introduced multiple aggressive price reductions in the Chinese market, which have contributed to heightened competition and price war. In early 2023 and early 2024, BYD launched the Champion Edition and Honor Edition variants of its models, respectively. These variants introduced price cuts, intended to increase BYD's market share in China.

In July 2024, BYD's off-road vehicle brand, Fangchengbao, significantly reduced the price of its Bao 5 model in China by 50,000 yuan to better compete with the popular Tank series by Great Wall Motor. The price reduction had sparked controversy among previous buyers. Protests occurred with banners criticizing Fangchengbao's sudden price cut, as some customers expressed frustration after waiting months for delivery only to see the price drop soon after.

In early 2025, BYD avoided price cuts in favour of offering self-driving systems as standard. However, in May 2025, BYD announced substantial price reductions across 22 models, with discounts reaching up to 34%, due to increasing inventory levels. The BYD Seagull experienced a 20% reduction to 55,800 yuan, while the BYD Han DM-p was discounted by 34% to 102,800 yuan. The move further intensified the ongoing price war, and triggered broad concern within the industry. Great Wall Motor chairman Wei Jianjun publicly compared the situation to the pre-collapse state of the Evergrande real estate group. At the same time, BYD, along with Dongfeng Motor and other Chinese automakers were summoned by China's Ministry of Commerce to attend a meeting addressing the rising number of "zero-mileage" used car sales, shortly after Great Wall Motor chairman, Wei Jianjun, also highlighted an ongoing trend in which brand new vehicles were registered and sold on used car platforms. This sales practice has been linked to strategies used by automakers and dealers to meet sales targets. As a result of the news, shares of BYD declined by 3.1%.

==== Thailand ====
In June 2024, BYD came under investigation by Thai authorities, including the Consumer Protection Commission (CPC) and the Office of the Consumer Protection Board (OCPB), regarding its practices in offering price cuts in the Thai market. The investigation was prompted by a complaint from a customer, stating that a salesperson on 19 June had convinced them to purchase a BYD Dolphin by claiming that prices would increase after the discount period ended. Instead, BYD reduced the car's price by 140,000–160,000 baht on 1 July, causing the customer to experience "psychological distress". On 5 July, the issue was discussed by Thailand Prime Minister Srettha Thavisin and BYD CEO Wang Chuanfu shortly after they both opened the BYD Thailand manufacturing plant. Wang promised to resolve the issue.

=== Manufacturing plant pollution ===
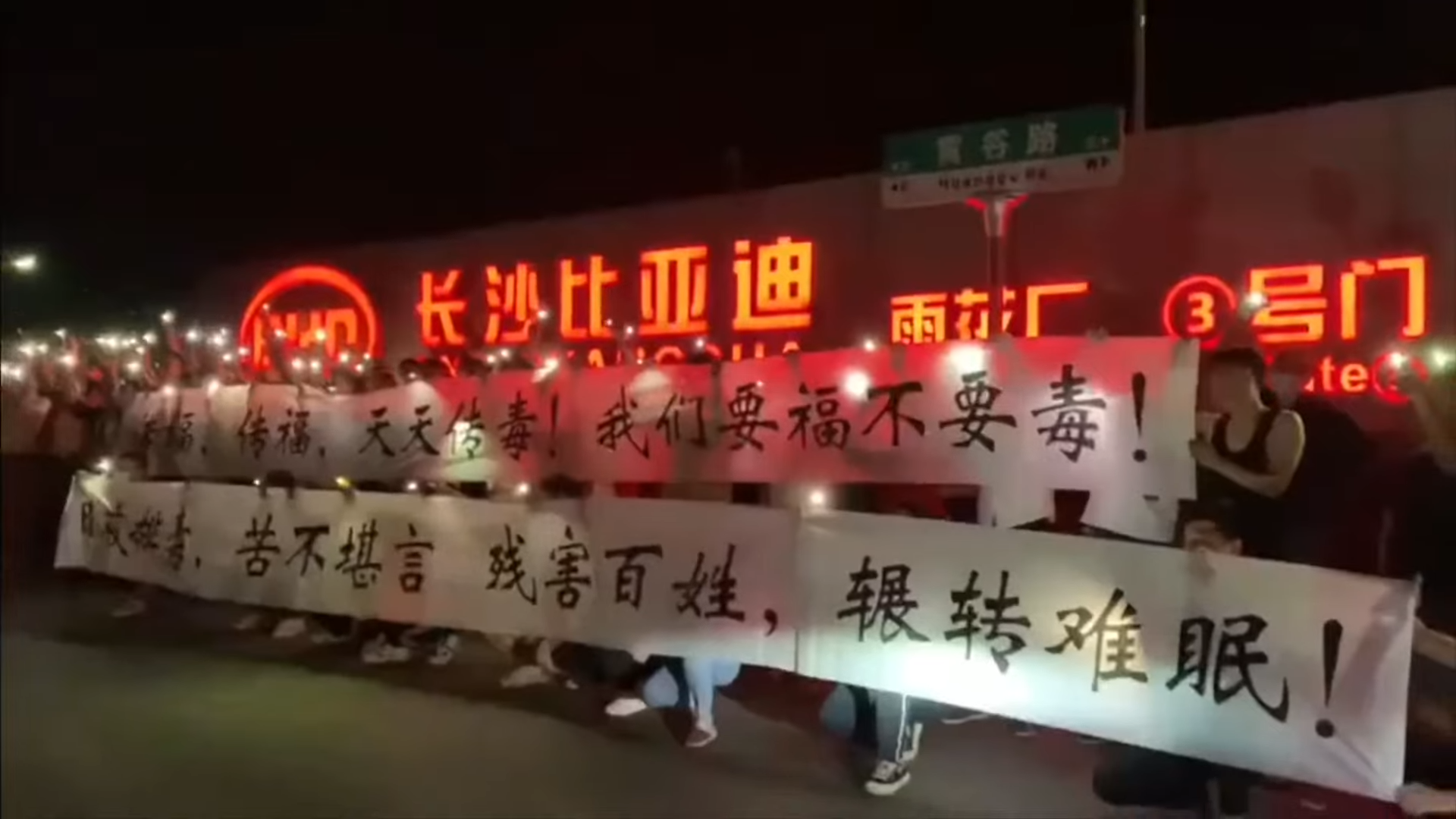
Protests at the BYD Auto Industry Changsha manufacturing plant

In May 2022, Changsha city authorities opened an investigation into a manufacturing plant owned by BYD Auto in the city following complaints from nearby residents. The allegations surfaced in April 2022 on a website belonging to state newspaper People's Daily, where people living near the factory left messages claiming the plant's pollution had a strong odour, which gave residents irritated throats and nosebleeds to children. Changsha residents purchased testing equipments and discovered that total volatile organic compound levels have exceeded safety standards. Residents protested at the Changsha plant's gate, urging the company to solve the problem. BYD denied the allegations, stating that all emissions from the plant were compliant with China's regulatory rules and standards, and threatened legal actions against people who spread rumours that emissions from the factory had caused nosebleeds. Production in the plant was partially halted during the investigation.

=== Emissions non-compliance allegations ===
In May 2023, rival Great Wall Motor (GWM) publicly reported through its social media that two BYD top-selling plug-in hybrid models did not meet emission standards. In a social media post, GWM accused BYD of using non-pressurised fuel tanks in its Qin Plus and Song Plus, enabling the liquid inside to evaporate more rapidly than it would in pressurised tanks, and announced that it had submitted evidence documents to Chinese authorities. BYD denied GWM's claim, saying the testing conducted by GWM was invalid as it had run its own tests by using a different testing method than required by authorities, and lacked third-party inspection.

=== Dealership fires ===
In May 2024, fire broke out in a BYD dealership in Fuzhou, Fujian. The Chinese language site of American news outlet NTDTV reported that it is the tenth BYD dealership fire since 2021. One BYD dealership fire case was reported in 2021, followed by four cases in 2022 and another four in 2023. Two factory fire cases were recorded in 2022 and 2023. BYD acknowledged the Fuzhou incident, but denied that the fire came from any of its vehicles and detected no abnormalities in the vehicle batteries during its inspection.

=== Alliance for American Manufacturing lawsuit ===
In November 2020, BYD in the U.S. filed a lawsuit against the Alliance for American Manufacturing (AAM), a non-profit lobbying group that advocated for a ban on using the federal tax budget to purchase rail cars or buses from foreign state-owned or controlled companies such like BYD, which has an electric bus factory in California, U.S. The rule was signed into law as the Transit Infrastructure Vehicle Security Act (TIVSA). BYD alleges that AAM has engaged in a "malicious, fraudulent, outrageous, and reckless campaign" that damages BYD's reputation. The Supreme Court of the United States rejected BYD's suit in August 2022.

=== Cybersecurity concerns ===
In July 2025, Israel's Ministry of Defense prohibited the use of certain BYD electric cars due to claimed cybersecurity concerns of unauthorized transmission of driver data to China.

In August 2025, Taiwan's Ministry of Economic Affairs restricted imports of BYD cars assembled in Thailand from entering the Taiwanese market due to considerations of national security, vehicle safety, information security and industrial development.

=== Quality concerns of buses ===
==== Quality issues in the United States ====
In December 2018, the Albuquerque, New Mexico council in the US sued BYD over the alleged poor welding, poor battery range, and malfunctioning doors and brakes of its buses. BYD denied the allegations, and the lawsuit was settled without money changing hands.

A 2018 investigation by The Los Angeles Times found quality and reliability issues with the BYD buses used by public transit agencies in California, such as frequent stalls and unpredictable driving ranges below advertised figures.

==== Toxic chemical use in Japan ====
In February 2023, BYD confirmed the presence of a toxic chemical, hexavalent chromium, in its electric buses in Japan. According to BYD, the contaminated vehicles will be "detoxified before being scrapped, leaving no impact on the environment."

==== Fraud and quality issues in the Netherlands ====
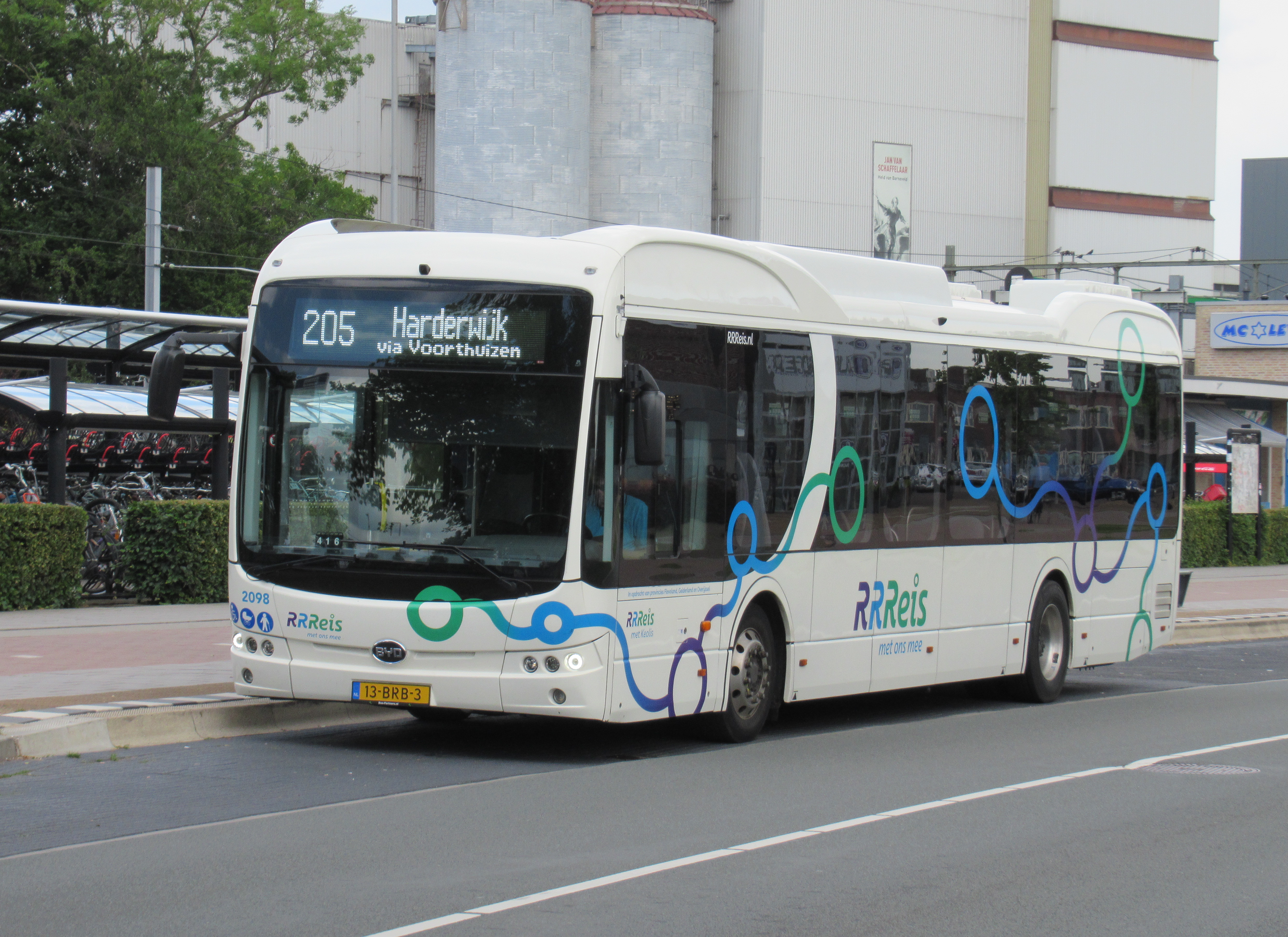
A BYD K9UB of Keolis in Barneveld

In December 2019, Keolis Nederland ordered over 250 buses from BYD for the IJssel-Vecht region in Eastern Netherlands, which was the largest order for electric buses in Europe at the time. Keolis was awarded a 10-year contract to run public transportation in the region starting in December 2020. In July 2020, it was revealed that Keolis did not provide all essential information in the bid to the provinces and tenderers. Keolis had made secret arrangements with BYD that was not disclosed during the bid, meaning that the company had essentially committed fraud to win the tender. Keolis was allowed to start operating in the area as part of an emergency concession as finding a new operator to takeover in such short notice would put the entire bus network in danger. The new contract running for 13 years from 2022 onward was awarded to EBS instead, which would take over 234 of the 259 BYD buses of Keolis.

BYD delivered the buses at the end of 2020. Immediately, problems arose with the quality and reliability of the buses, generally related with the electronics and the software. The most significant reported issue was the battery, which would be shown as full on the dashboard, only to suddenly empty out, leading to buses being stranded mid-route. Another prominent issue was the bus veering to the right while driving, causing the drivers to constantly steer to the left. Additionally, the driver's seat was not centered around the steering wheel and was too small in most cases. Because of the steering and seat issues, drivers have complained of experiencing physical pain during and after driving. While EBS was aware of the quality issues surrounding the BYD buses, these turned out to be "more numerous and persistent" than initially expected. The three companies involved have reached an agreement regarding the cost of repairs, though the contents of these have not been made public.

=== Electric bus subsidy fraud ===
In 2016, a suicide note by a dealership owner in Nanjing led to an investigation into government subsidy fraud. The note claimed that BYD had received subsidies for 600 electric buses it had never produced, with only a few dozen delivered to the city government. BYD reportedly forced dealerships to increase electric vehicle inventories, selling to people outside of Nanjing and helping them obtain temporary residence documents. The dealerships ended up paying subsidies on 80 percent of vehicles sold. Following the case, the Chinese Finance Ministry fined five manufacturers (not including BYD) for fraudulently obtaining over CN¥1 billion worth of subsidies. The companies were required to return the subsidies and pay penalties worth an additional 50% of the subsidies received.

== Sales ==
BYD yearly global sales (Note: Figures before 2012 exclude exports)
Year	Total	BYD	Denza	Yangwang	FCB
2003	21,253	21,253	-	-	-
2004	17,900	17,900	-	-	-
2005	11,038	11,038	-	-	-
2006	63,592	63,592	-	-	-
2007	101,665	101,665	-	-	-
2008	170,880	170,880	-	-	-
2009	448,458	448,458	-	-	-
2010	521,761	521,761	-	-	-
2011	454,676	454,676	-	-	-
2012	462,512	462,512	-	-	-
2013	514,188	514,188	-	-	-
2014	446,329	446,329	-	-	-
2015	451,868	449,068	2,800	-	-
2016	510,157	507,870	2,287	-	-
2017	421,158	416,445	4,713	-	-
2018	528,298	526,324	1,974	-	-
2019	467,960	465,871	2,089	-	-
2020	431,447	427,302	4,175	-	-
2021	749,325	744,617	4,708	-	-
2022	1,881,669	1,871,866	9,803	-	-
2023	3,024,417	2,888,864	127,840	2,001	5,712
2024	4,272,145	4,075,449	126,036	8,560	62,100
2025	4,602,436	4,105,211	157,134	4,785	234,637

BYD car sales in 2009 were 448,400 vehicles. Its F3 was the best-selling sedan in China with sales of over 291,000 units. In 2010, BYD sold 519,800 vehicles, representing 2.9% of the market in China, its sixth largest manufacturer. In 2011, the BYD sales rank was outside the top ten. In 2012, the company became the ninth largest car manufacturer in China, producing over 600,000 vehicles. In 2013, BYD sold 506,189 passenger cars in China, ranking tenth.

=== 2021–present: Rapid sales increase ===
Since 2021, BYD's sales have grown significantly, driven in part by the rapid increase in new energy vehicle sales as a share of total passenger vehicle sales in China during 2021 and 2022. While the new energy vehicle market share were stagnant between 4–5% since 2018, in 2021 and 2022, new energy vehicles accounted for 15.4 and 27.5% all passenger vehicle sales respectively. Within BYD's total vehicle sales, new energy vehicles also accounted for an increasing percentage from 52.4% in 2018 into reaching 99.2% in the first half of 2022, shortly before the company ended production of pure internal combustion engine vehicles.

In the first half of 2022, BYD becomes the top plug-in electric vehicle seller in the world after surpassing Tesla by selling 641,000 vehicles. In September 2022, BYD became the first carmaker in China to build one million new energy vehicles in a single year.

In late 2022 and early 2023, BYD plug-in hybrid vehicles surpassed the sales of its battery electric vehicles, which was partly attributed to the positive reception of BYD's DM-i system that replaced the older DM system in January 2021.

The company surpassed Tesla as the world's top battery electric vehicle manufacturer in the fourth quarter of 2023 by selling 526,409 battery electric cars, while Tesla delivered 484,507 vehicles. Meanwhile, throughout 2023, BYD remained the world's largest plug-in hybrid electric vehicle manufacturer and the second-largest battery electric vehicle manufacturer (after Tesla), with global market shares of 21.4% and 15%, respectively. In that period, 52.5% of BYD's sales volume were contributed by battery electric vehicles (including commercial vehicles).

BYD became the top-selling car brand in China ahead of Volkswagen in 2023, marking the first time another company has sold more cars than Volkswagen in the country. In early 2024, BYD sales in China were briefly surpassed by Volkswagen, ending its 11-month streak as the top-selling brand in China. This was attributed to the 2024 Chinese New Year holiday and reduced demand. BYD regained the top position by the second quarter of 2024. In that quarter, BYD global sales has surpassed Honda and Nissan, making it the seventh-largest automaker in the world.

BYD ended 2024 achieving 4,272,145 sales, a 41.3% increase compared to 2023. In the Chinese domestic market, with 3,718,281 retail sales, BYD is the market leader with a 16.2% share (all vehicles) and 34.1% share in the new energy vehicle category. Plug-in hybrid vehicles contributed about 60% of its wholesale sales in that year.

JPMorgan expects BYD to sell 6.5 million vehicles in 2026.

=== Quarterly sales (2018–present) ===
- ICE
- PHEV
- BEV
- Buses & trucks

BYD quarterly global sales (since 2018)
Quarter	ICE	PHEV	BEV	Buses & trucks	Total
Q1 2018	82,140	23,184	5,315	1,138	111,777
Q2 2018	67,473	24,246	18,525	2,476	112,720
Q3 2018	58,540	33,976	30,091	4,467	127,074
Q4 2018	64,723	42,483	49,332	12,578	169,116
Q1 2019	44,406	25,745	45,487	1,940	117,578
Q2 2019	38,013	19,237	50,292	2,952	110,494
Q3 2019	60,756	17,279	27,879	1,809	107,723
Q4 2019	88,718	9,907	23,527	3,452	125,604
Q1 2020	39,081	3,412	18,110	670	61,273
Q2 2020	58,870	7,776	28,151	2,467	97,264
Q3 2020	60,083	14,325	32,088	3,628	110,124
Q4 2020	79,249	22,571	52,981	3,556	158,357
Q1 2021	49,394	14,781	38,599	1,371	104,145
Q2 2021	42,716	41,990	54,841	2,444	141,991
Q3 2021	23,055	88,903	91,684	2,101	205,743
Q4 2021	21,183	127,261	135,686	3,257	287,387
Q1 2022	5,049	141,424	143,223	1,496	291,192
Q2 2022	0	173,124	180,296	1,601	355,021
Q3 2022	0	278,554	258,610	1,540	538,704
Q4 2022	0	343,047	329,011	1,382	673,440
Q1 2023	0	283,270	264,647	4,159	552,076
Q2 2023	0	348,081	352,163	3,317	703,561
Q3 2023	0	390,491	431,603	1,907	824,001
Q4 2023	0	416,242	526,409	2,128	944,779
Q1 2024	0	324,284	300,114	1,865	626,263
Q2 2024	0	556,708	426,039	3,973	986,720
Q3 2024	0	685,830	443,426	5,636	1,134,892
Q4 2024	0	918,556	595,413	10,301	1,524,270
Q1 2025	0	569,710	416,388	14,706	1,000,804
Q2 2025	0	520,180	606,993	17,977	1,145,150
Q3 2025	0	523,069	582,522	8,601	1,114,192
Q4 2025	0	675,750	650,811	15,729	1,342,290
Q1 2026	0	378,604	310,389	11,470	700,463
Q2 2026	0	531,292	557,090	19,666	1,108,048
Q3 2026	0	538,691	762,478	21,896	1,323,065

=== Milestones ===
Milestone	Date	Milestone model produced
1,000,000th NEV production	19 May 2021	BYD Han EV
2,000,000th NEV production	May 2022	
3,000,000th NEV production	16 November 2022	BYD Seal
5,000,000th NEV production	3 August 2023	Denza N7
6,000,000th NEV production	24 November 2023	Fangchengbao Bao 5
7,000,000th NEV production	25 March 2024	Denza N7
8,000,000th NEV production	4 July 2024	Thai-built BYD Dolphin
9,000,000th NEV production	25 September 2024	Yangwang U9
10,000,000th NEV production	18 November 2024	Denza Z9
15,000,000th NEV production	18 December 2025	Denza N8L
16,000,000th NEV production	22 April 2026	Denza D9
17,000,000th NEV production	8 July 2026	BYD Seal 08

== See also ==
- Automotive industry in China
- Automobile manufacturers and brands of China
- List of automobile manufacturers of China
- Plug-in electric vehicles in China
- Electric vehicle industry in China
- List of production battery electric vehicles
- BYD Company
- List of BYD Auto vehicles
- List of automotive manufacturers by production
