= New Europe =

New Europe may refer to:

== Entertainment ==
- Michael Palin's New Europe, a travel documentary presented by Michael Palin
- New Europe (book), the book that Michael Palin wrote to accompany the series
- New Europe Film Sales, a Polish independent film distributor
- Film New Europe Association
- New European Ensemble, classical music group
- New European Painting, emerged in the 1980s

== Periodicals ==
- The New Europe, defunct British magazine
- Business New Europe, a magazine
- Finance New Europe, a magazine and website in Prague, Czech Republic
- A10 – new European architecture, an architectural magazine

== Other ==
- A8 countries, central and eastern European countries that joined the EU in 2004
- "New Europe" (politics), a term referring to central and eastern European countries
- New Europe Bridge, between the cities of Vidin, Bulgaria and Calafat, Romania
- New European Driving Cycle, to assess car emissions and fuel economy
- New European Order, a neo-fascist alliance set up in 1951
- New European Transmission System, a project to unite Central and South Eastern Europe's natural gas transmission networks
- Newropeans, a former European political alliance

== See also ==
- Europe (disambiguation)
- New European (disambiguation)
- Nouvelle Europe, a Paris-based organization founded in 2003
- Old Europe (disambiguation)
