= BYD Dolphin =

Battery electric hatchback

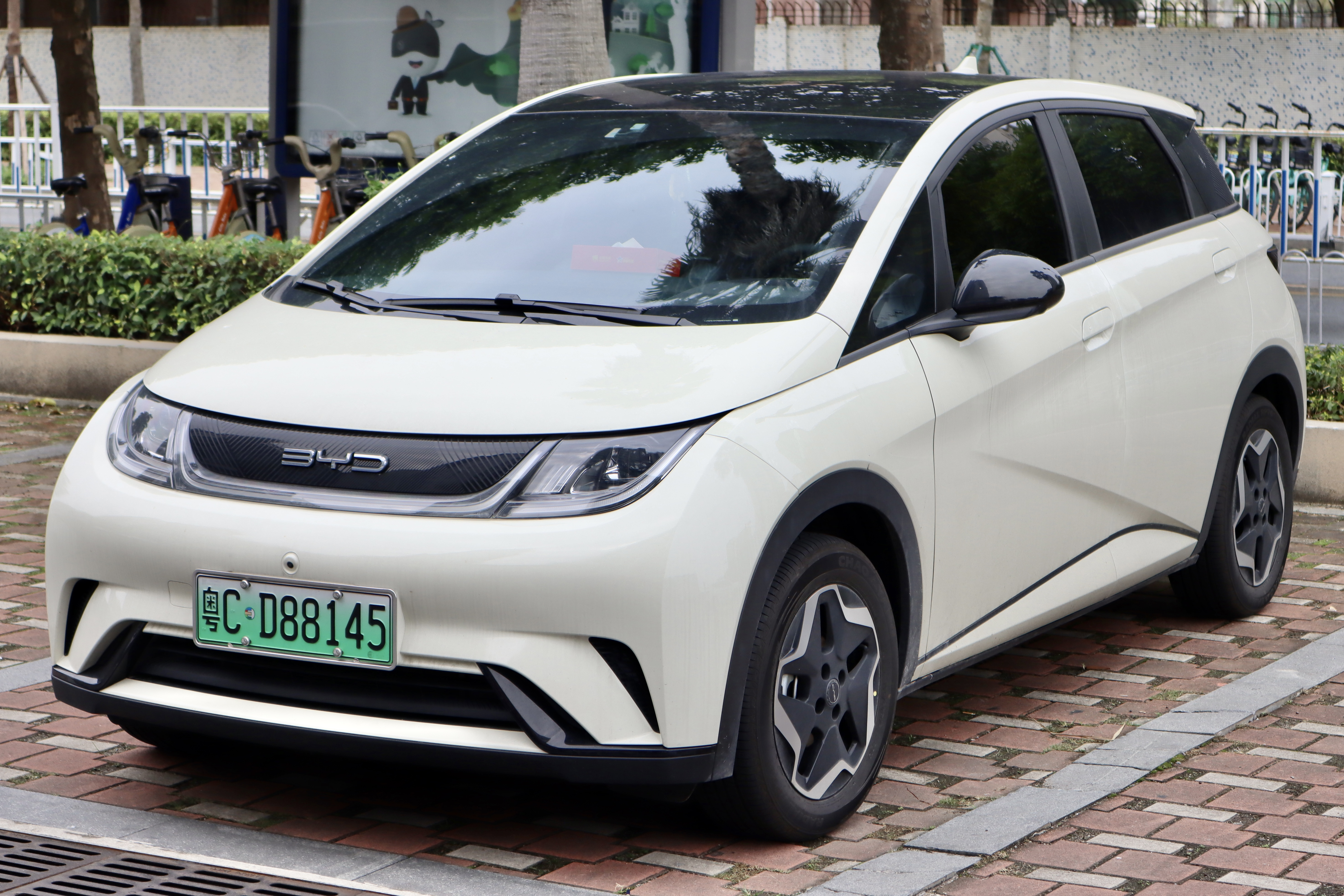

Overview
- Manufacturer: BYD Auto
- Model code: EA1; EM2E
- Also called: BYD New E2 (Uruguay); BYD New E2 X (facelift, Uruguay)
- Production: August 2021 – present
- Assembly: China: Shenzhen, Guangdong; Changsha, Hunan; Thailand: Rayong (BYD Auto (Thailand), 2024–present)
- Designer: Under the lead of Wolfgang Egger

Body and chassis
- Class: Subcompact car (B, China; 2021–2025); Compact car (C, Global; 2023–present)
- Body style: 5-door hatchback
- Layout: Front-motor, front-wheel-drive; Front-engine, front-motor, front-wheel-drive
- Platform: e-Platform 3.0
- Related: BYD Seagull; BYD Yuan Up / Atto 2; BYD Yuan Plus / Atto 3

Powertrain
- Electric motor: Permanent magnet synchronous
- Power output: 70 kW (95 PS; 94 hp); 130 kW (177 PS; 174 hp); 150 kW (204 PS; 201 hp) (outside China)
- Transmission: 1-speed A/T
- Battery: 30.72–60.48 kWh BYD Blade LFP
- Electric range: 301 km (187 mi) (NEDC, 30.72 kWh); 401–405 km (249–252 mi) (NEDC, 44.928 kWh); 427 km (265 mi) (WLTP, European 60.48 kWh)
- Plug-in charging: AC: 7.4 kW; 11 kW (Europe, except base model); DC: 40 kW (30.7 kWh, China); 60–65 kW (44.9 kWh); 70 kW (50.25 kWh); 88 kW (global); V2L

Dimensions
- Wheelbase: 2,700 mm (106.3 in)
- Length: 4,070–4,150 mm (160.2–163.4 in) (China; 2021–2025); 4,280 mm (168.5 in) (China, 2025–present); 4,290 mm (168.9 in) (global / Dolphin Plus)
- Width: 1,770 mm (69.7 in)
- Height: 1,570 mm (61.8 in)
- Curb weight: 1,285–1,658 kg (2,832.9–3,655.3 lb)

The BYD Dolphin (Chinese: 比亚迪海豚; pinyin: Bǐyǎdí Hǎitún) is a battery electric hatchback produced by the Chinese manufacturer BYD Auto since 2021. A subcompact (B-segment) hatchback, the Dolphin is positioned above the Seagull in the Chinese market and part of BYD's Ocean Series.

The Dolphin has been exported to overseas markets such as Europe, Australia and Southeast Asia since 2023 with lengthened dimensions to satisfy more stringent crash safety standards, and placing it in the compact or C-segment space.

== Overview ==
During Auto Shanghai in April 2021, BYD presented a pre-production prototype of the Dolphin called BYD EA1 Concept, while also announcing a modernized design language and company logo. The company also introduced presented a new generation of electric car platform called the e-Platform 3.0, which offer more efficient performance and range.

The production model was presented three months later as the BYD Dolphin, and became available in August 2021. The Dolphin adopts BYD's Marine Aesthetics design language that is also used in other Ocean Series models, a one-box side silhouette devised by head of BYD design team Wolfgang Egger. The Dolphin was the first production model to feature the new BYD logo.

The interior of the Dolphin features a rotatable 12.8-inch infotainment screen, and a full 5-inch LCD instrument panel. It comes standard with the LFP blade battery in varying capacities.

The modified version destined for the global market was introduced in 2023. For most export markets, the Dolphin was lengthened by approximately 20 cm (7.9 in) in order to accommodate a new front-end crash structure, which was designed to achieve a five-star Australian ANCAP safety rating. The global model received different front and rear bumpers, front hood and wing fenders that extended its overhang, which increased its length to 4,290 mm (168.9 in) and placing it as a C-segment car.

On 22 September 2023, the 500,000th Dolphin rolled off the assembly line after 25 months in production.

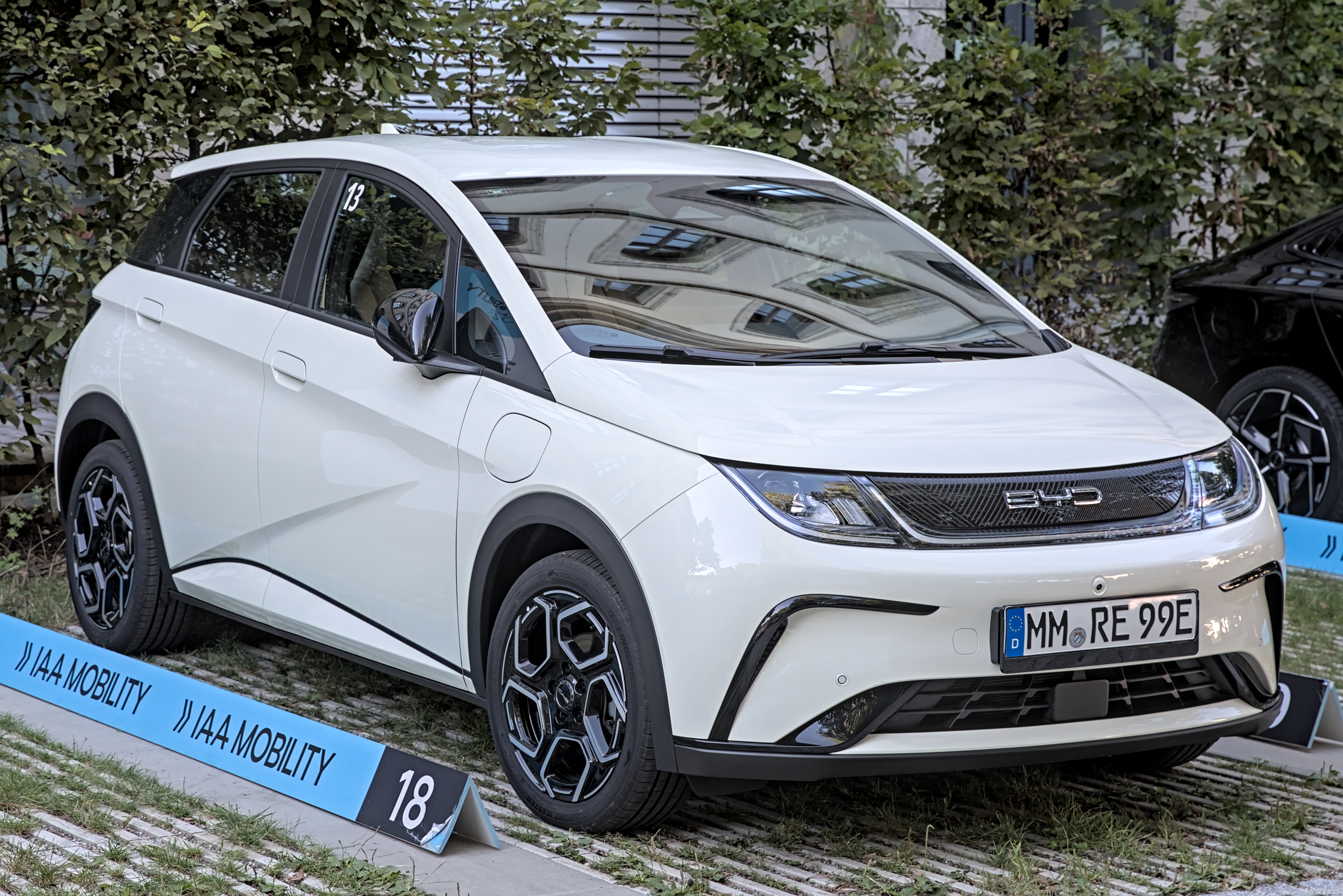
Front view (global)

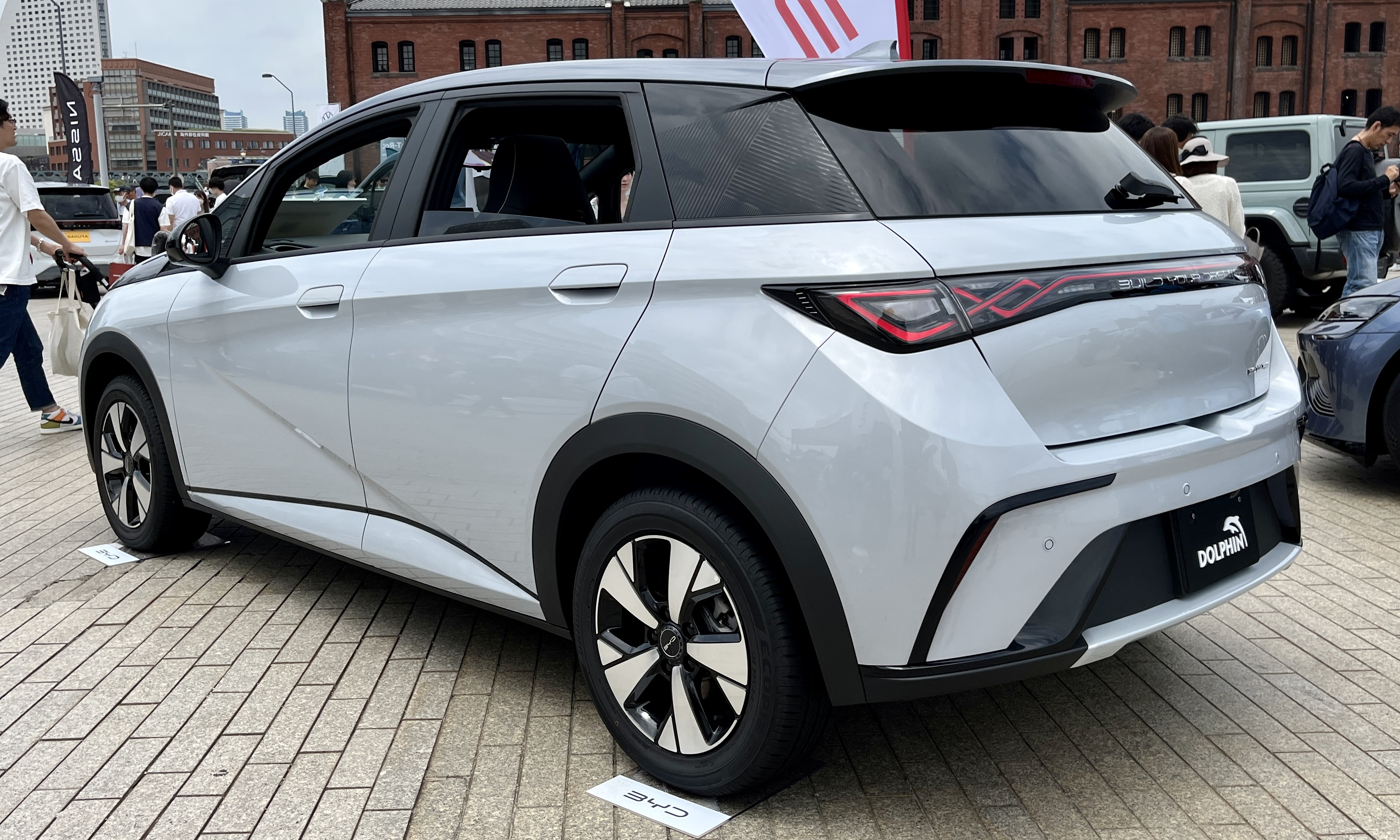
Rear view (global)

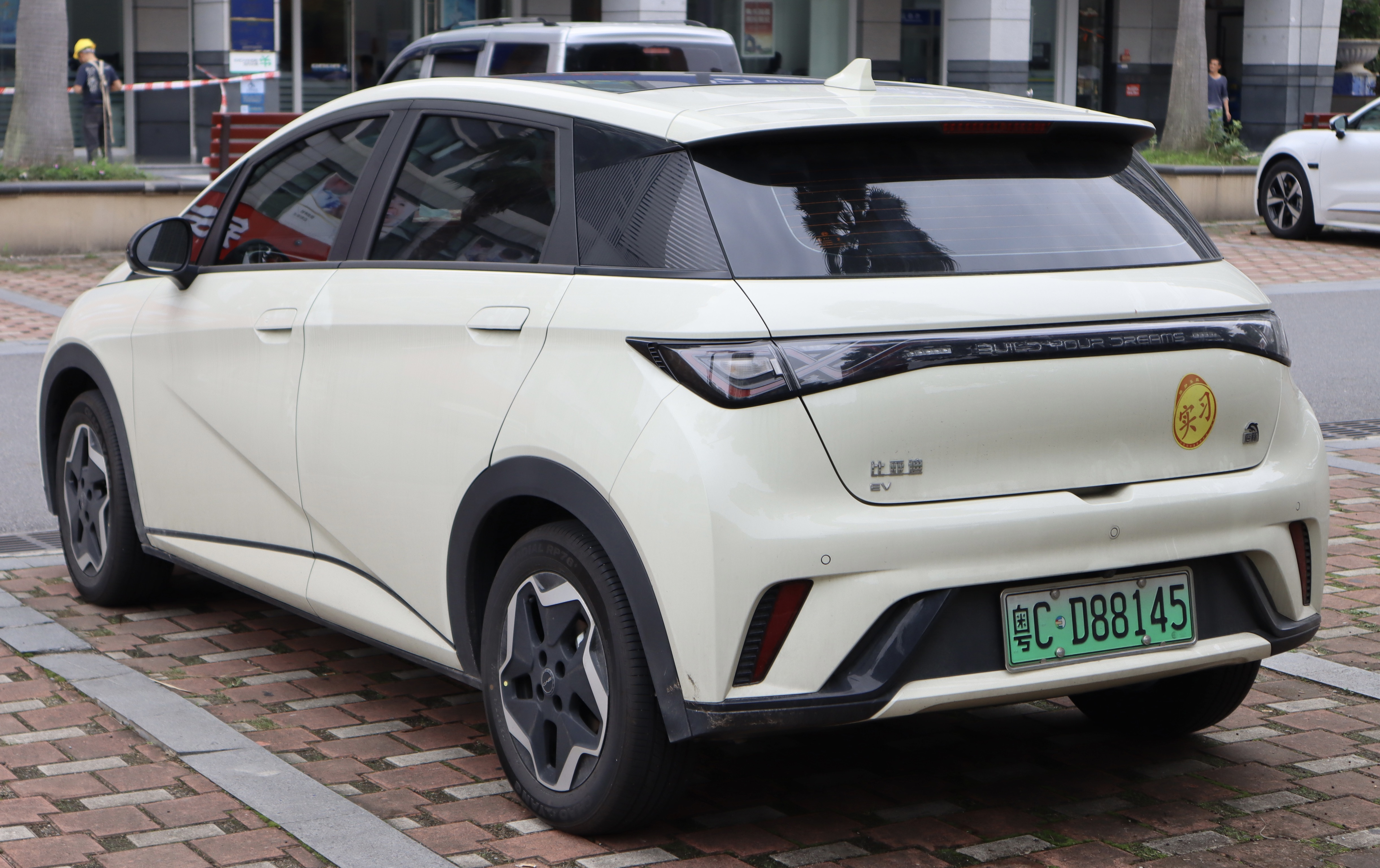
Rear view (China)

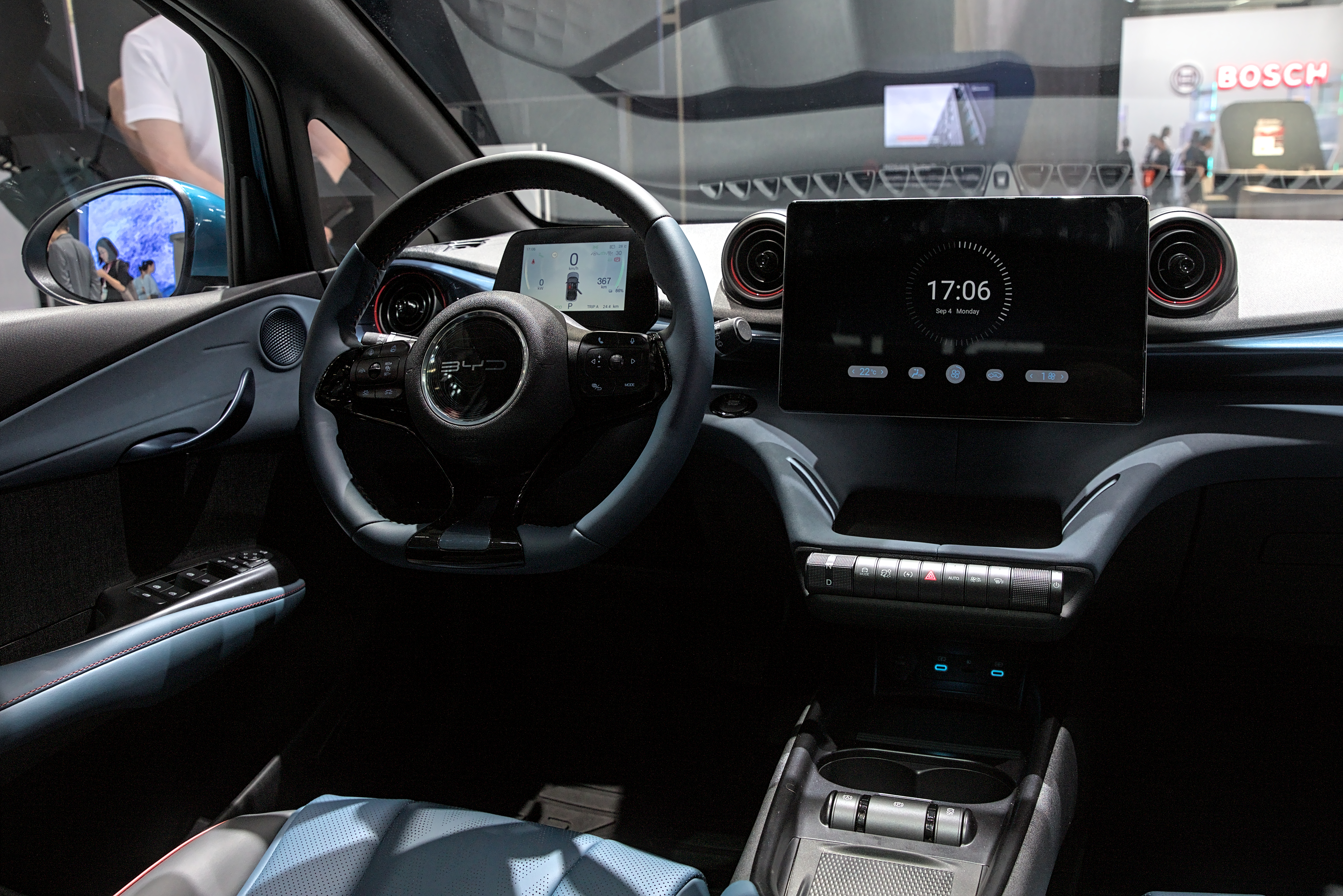
Interior

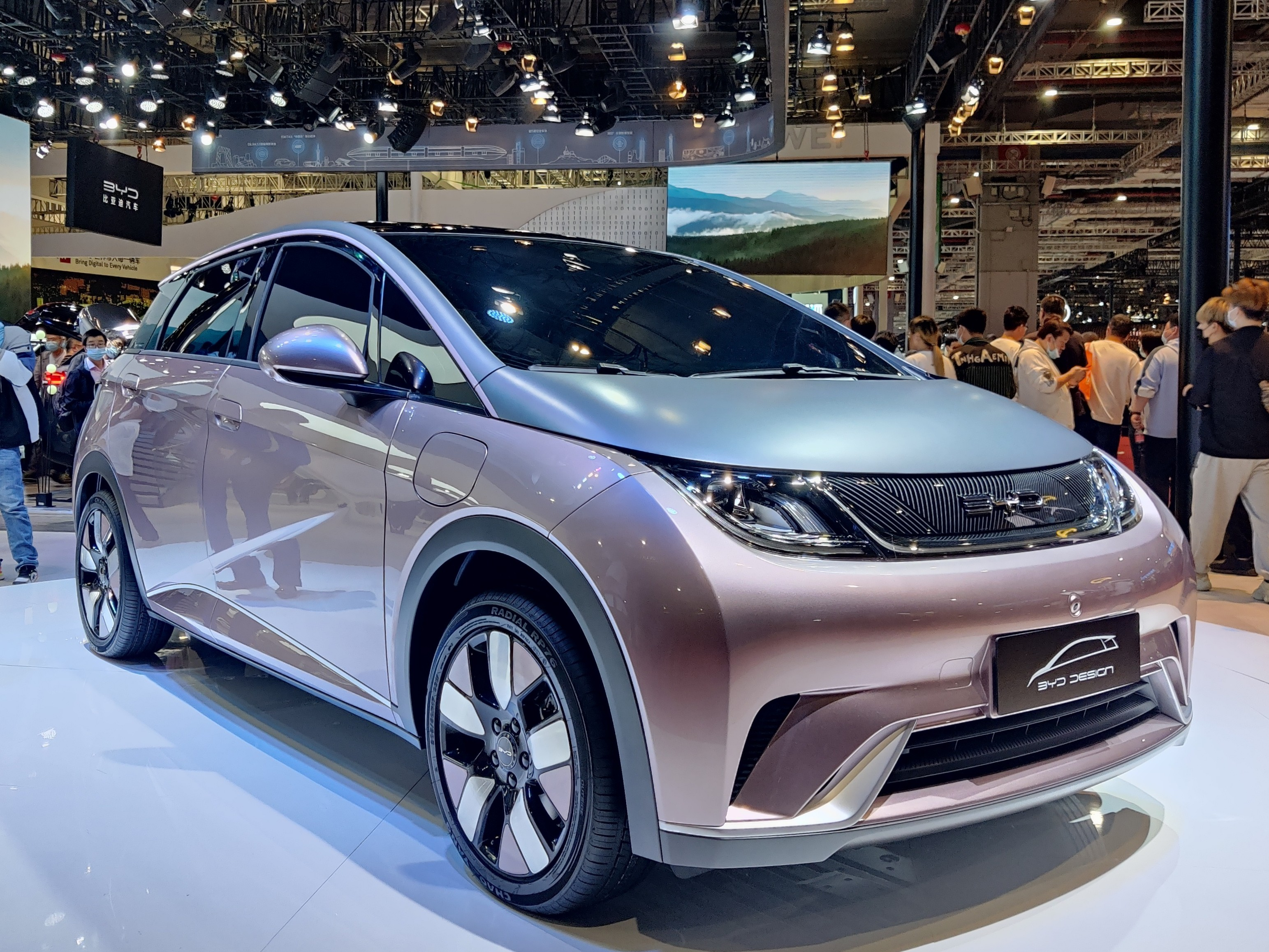
BYD EA1 Concept

=== 2025 facelift ===
The Dolphin received a major update in March 2025 for the Chinese market. The model received a redesigned front and rear design which increased its length by 130 mm (5.1 in), revised dashboard design, and a steering-mounted gear selector. It is also equipped with BYD's latest advanced driver assistance system marketed as God's Eye C and DiPilot 100 as standard.

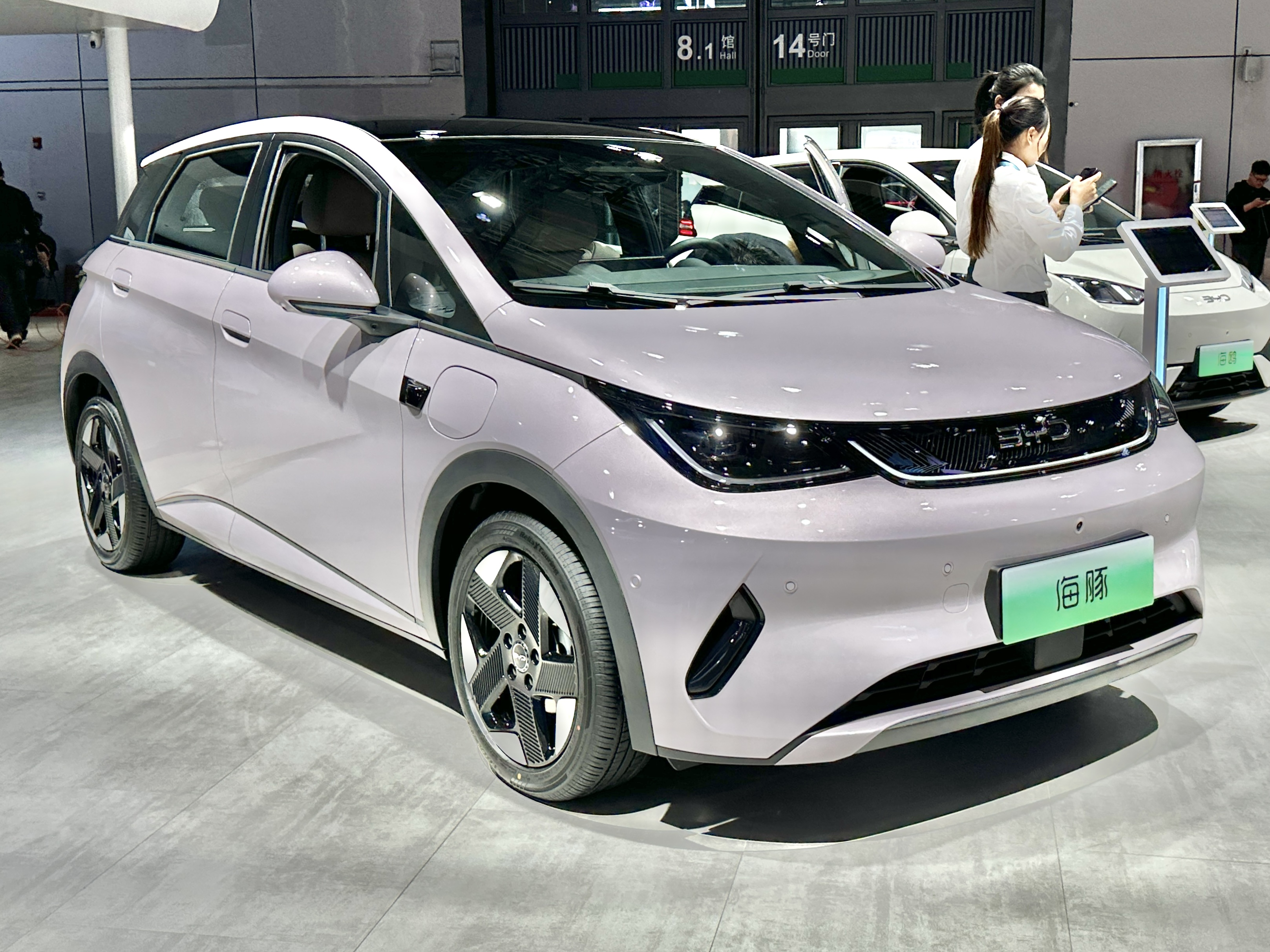
2025 BYD Dolphin facelift

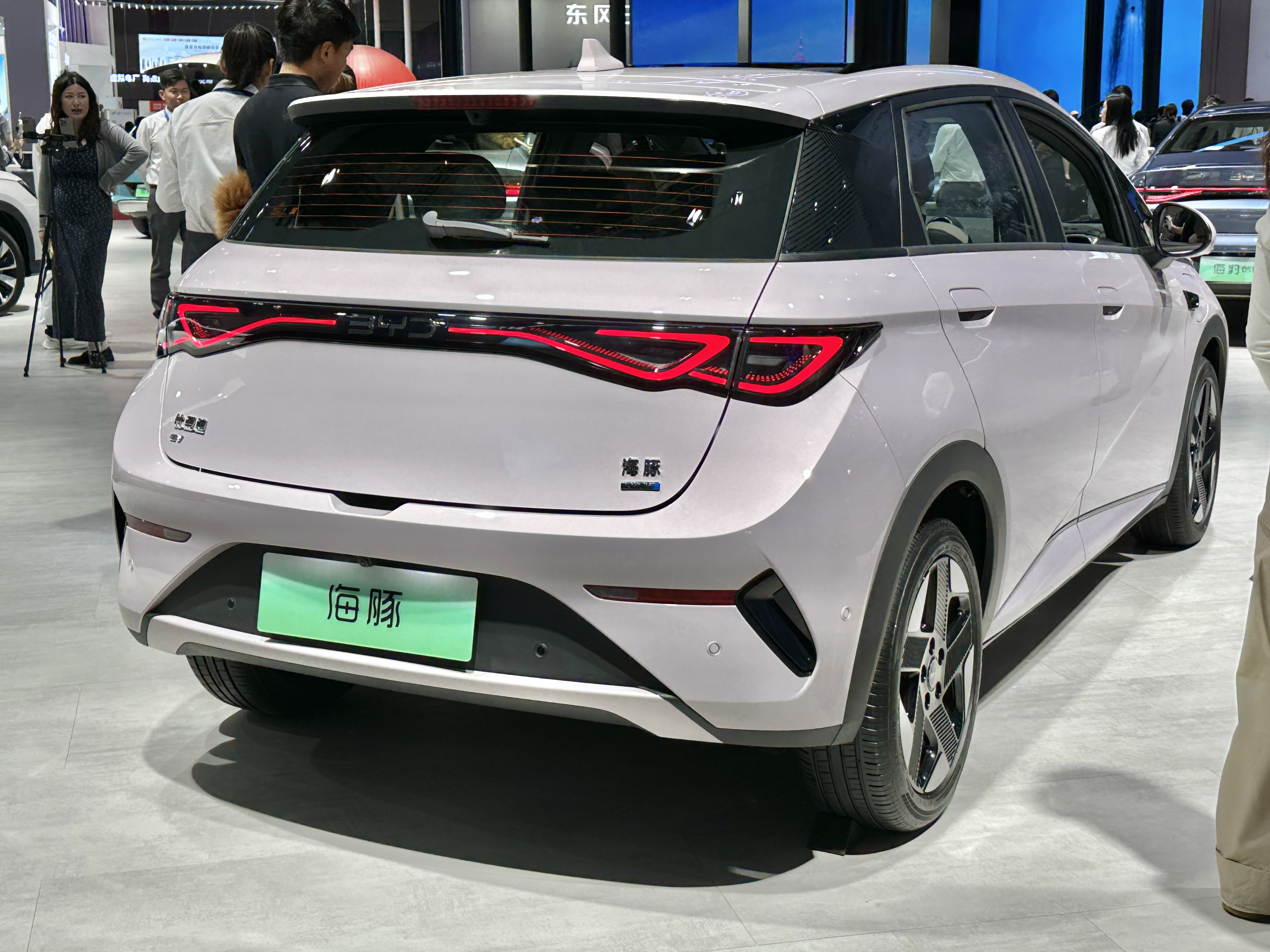
Rear view

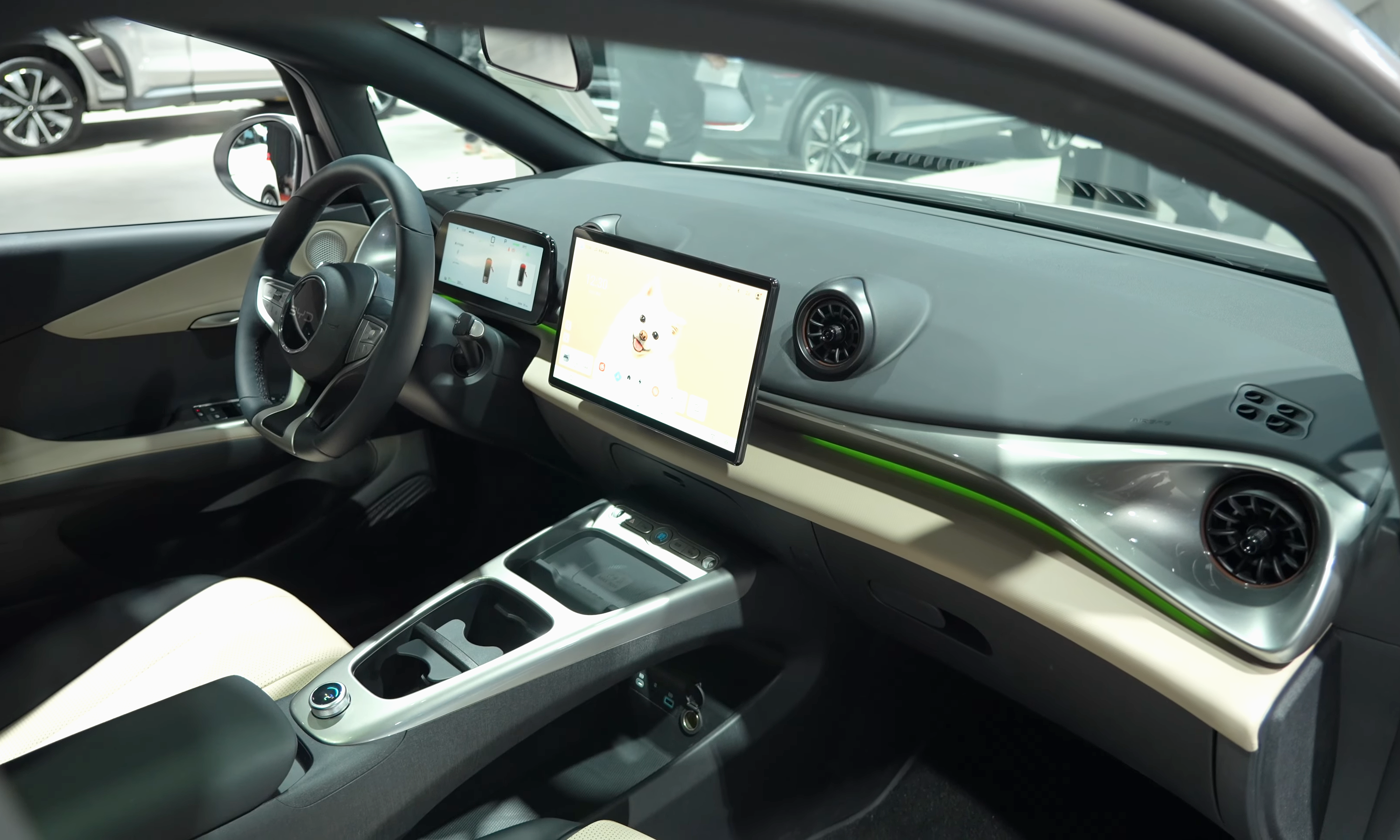
Interior

== Dolphin G DM-i (2026) ==
The BYD Dolphin G DM-i is an upcoming plug-in hybrid compact hatchback that was first unveiled in Europe in late-May 2026, and is the first BYD Dolphin hatchback to adopt the plug-in hybrid system. It uses a different bodywork from the electric version, this model is not available for sale in China.

== Powertrain ==
=== China / Latin America ===
The specifications below corresponds to the 4.1-metre (161.4 in)-long Dolphin marketed in China and some export markets such as Latin America.

| Battery | Layout | Electric motor | Power | Torque | 0–100 km/h (0–62 mph) (claimed) | Range (claimed) | | | Calendar years | Note |
| Battery | Layout | Electric motor | Power | Torque | 0–100 km/h (0–62 mph) (claimed) | CLTC | NEDC | WLTP | Calendar years | Note |
|---|---|---|---|---|---|---|---|---|---|---|
| 30.72 kWh LFP blade battery | FWD | Permanent magnet synchronous motor | 70 kW (94 hp) | 180 N⋅m (18.4 kg⋅m; 133 lb⋅ft) | 10.5 seconds | 301 km (187 mi) | | | 2021–2022 | |
| 44.9 kWh LFP blade battery | FWD | Permanent magnet synchronous motor | 70 kW (94 hp) | 180 N⋅m (18.4 kg⋅m; 133 lb⋅ft) | 10.9 seconds | 420 km (261 mi) | 405 km (252 mi) | | 2021–present | Exported to Latin America |
| 44.9 kWh LFP blade battery | FWD | Permanent magnet synchronous motor | 130 kW (174 hp) | 290 N⋅m (29.6 kg⋅m; 214 lb⋅ft) | 7.5 seconds | 401 km (249 mi) | | | 2021–present | |
| 60.48 kWh LFP blade battery | FWD | Permanent magnet synchronous motor | 150 kW (201 hp) | 310 N⋅m (31.6 kg⋅m; 229 lb⋅ft) | | 520 km (323 mi) | | | 2024–present | Available with the Dolphin Champion Edition |

=== Global ===
The global, 4,290 mm (168.9 in)-long Dolphin became available in 2023 in Europe, and right-hand drive markets such as Australia, Thailand and Malaysia. The global version is also sold in Latin America as the Dolphin Plus. For the Extended Range version, it receives a more sophisticated independent multi-link rear suspension setup replacing torsion beam.

| Type | Battery | Layout | Electric motor | Power | Torque | 0–100 km/h (0–62 mph) (claimed) | Range (claimed) | | Calendar years |
| Type | Battery | Layout | Electric motor | Power | Torque | 0–100 km/h (0–62 mph) (claimed) | NEDC | WLTP | Calendar years |
|---|---|---|---|---|---|---|---|---|---|
| Standard Range | 44.9 kWh LFP blade battery | FWD | Permanent magnet synchronous motor | 70 kW (94 hp) | 180 N⋅m (18.4 kg⋅m; 133 lb⋅ft) | 12.3 seconds | 410 km (255 mi) | 340 km (211 mi) | 2023–present |
| Standard Range | 44.9 kWh LFP blade battery | FWD | Permanent magnet synchronous motor | 130 kW (174 hp) | 260 N⋅m (26.5 kg⋅m; 192 lb⋅ft) | 7.5 seconds | | 315 km (196 mi) | 2024–present |
| Standard Range | 50.25 kWh LFP blade battery | FWD | Permanent magnet synchronous motor | 70 kW (94 hp) | 180 N⋅m (18.4 kg⋅m; 133 lb⋅ft) | 12.3 seconds | 435 km (270 mi) | | 2024–present (Thailand) |
| Extended Range | 60.48 kWh LFP blade battery | FWD | Permanent magnet synchronous motor | 150 kW (201 hp) | 310 N⋅m (31.6 kg⋅m; 229 lb⋅ft) | 7.0 seconds | 490 km (304 mi) | 427 km (265 mi) | 2023–present |

== Markets ==
=== Asia ===
==== Brunei ====
The Dolphin has been launched in Brunei on 15 June 2024 and it was only offered in Dynamic Standard Range (44.9 kWh) in a single trim.

==== China ====
In China, the Dolphin is available in two versions and three trim levels. The Free and Fashion trim levels is equipped with a 70 kW (95 PS; 94 hp) motor, while the Knight Edition has a more powerful 130 kW (177 PS; 174 hp) motor. Previously, the Dolphin was available in a basic trim with a 30.72 kWh blade battery, with a range of 301 km (187 mi). Between 2023 and 2024, all versions uses the same 44.9 kWh blade battery. With the body kit equipped to the Knight Edition, the variant is 30 mm (1.2 in) longer.

In September 2023, the Dolphin 500,000 Commemorative Edition was released to celebrate the production of the 500,000th Dolphin. It was available in two sub-variants, Pro and Plus.

In February 2024, the Dolphin Champion Edition went on sale as the 2024 model year. It received an independent multi-link rear suspension setup, a 60 kWh battery option with a 150 kW (204 PS; 201 hp) electric motor and a wireless charger, which were previously reserved for the global market version.

In February 2025, the Dolphin was facelifted with the new design front and rear with the length increased 4,280 mm (168.5 in).

==== Indonesia ====
The Dolphin was introduced in Indonesia in January 2024 alongside the Atto 3 and Seal, as part of BYD's entry to the Indonesian passenger car market. Sales price were announced at the 31st Indonesia International Motor Show in February 2024. It is available in two variants: the Dynamic Standard Range (70 kW (95 PS; 94 hp) and the Premium Extended Range (150 kW (204 PS; 201 hp).

==== Japan ====
The Dolphin was launched in Japan in September 2023, with two variants: the Dolphin (44.9 kWh 70 kW (95 PS; 94 hp) and the Dolphin Long Range (58.56 kWh 150 kW (204 PS; 201 hp).

==== Malaysia ====
The Dolphin was launched in Malaysia on 27 July 2023, as the second BYD model to be marketed in Malaysia, with deliveries started in August 2023. It is available in two variants: Dynamic Standard Range (70 kW (95 PS; 94 hp) and Premium Extended Range (150 kW (204 PS; 201 hp).

==== Nepal ====
The Dolphin was launched in Nepal on 11 September 2023, by Cimex Inc., the authorized distributor. The electric hatchback features a 44.9 kWh battery with a range of up to 340 km.

==== Thailand ====
In March 2023, the global right hand drive version of Dolphin was shown to the public for the first time as the Standard Range (70 kW (95 PS; 94 hp) with 44.9 kWh blade battery) at the Bangkok International Motor Show 2023. Rever Automotive, BYD's Thailand distributor, introduced Standard Range 95 PS and Extended Range (150 kW (204 PS; 201 hp) with 60.48 kWh blade battery) to the press at the end of June 2023.

In July 2024, the locally assembled model went on sale with a lower price. The Standard Range model received a larger 50.25 kWh battery, increasing its NEDC-rated range to 435 km (270 mi). It also received faster DC charging capacity from 60 kW to 70 kW.

==== Vietnam ====
The Dolphin was introduced in Vietnam on 18 July 2024 alongside the Atto 3 and Seal, as part of BYD's entry in Vietnam. Initially imported from China, it is available in a sole GLX variant using the Standard Range 44.9 kWh powertrain. In April 2026, the Dolphin became imported from Thailand for the Vietnamese market, updated features, and is available in the sole variant with an upgraded battery capacity of 50.25 kWh.

=== Europe ===
The European version of the Dolphin was introduced in April 2023. As with the global specification, the European market Dolphin occupies the C-segment as it received different front and rear bumpers that extended its length to of 4,290 mm (168.9 in). In addition, the powertrain of the European-spec Dolphin is upgraded. The car is powered by a 150 kW (204 PS; 201 hp) front-wheel drive motor, paired with a 60.48 kWh battery which is shared with the Atto 3.

=== Latin America ===
==== Brazil ====
The Dolphin was released in Brazil In July 2023. It is available in two models, which are Dolphin and the global market Dolphin Plus.

The Dolphin sold 6,812 units in Brazil in 2023, making it the best-selling electric car in the country.

==== Mexico ====
The Dolphin was launched in Mexico on 20 September 2023, as the fourth BYD model to be marketed in Mexico.

=== Oceania ===
==== Australia ====
In February 2022, BYD's Australian distributor, EVDirect, announced plans to sell the Dolphin in Australia. The Dolphin went on sale in Australia on 22 June 2023, with three grades: Dynamic, Premium and Sport. The Dynamic grade use the 44.9 kWh blade battery pack, while the Premium and Sport grades use the 60.48 kWh blade battery pack. The Dynamic was replaced by the Essential (44.9 kWh) as the entry-level trim for the Dolphin in January 2025.

==== New Zealand ====
In New Zealand, the Dolphin is available with two range variants: the Standard Range has a 44.9 kWh blade battery with a WLTP range of 340 km (210 mi) and the Extended Range carries a 60.48 kWh blade battery, increasing the WLTP range to 427 km (265 mi).

=== South Africa ===
The Dolphin was launched in South Africa on 18 May 2024, with two variants: Standard Range (44.9 kWh) and Extended Range (60.48 kWh).

== Recall ==
On 30 September 2024, BYD recalled 96,714 Dolphin and Yuan Plus vehicles in China due to a fire risk. The affected vehicles were manufactured between November 2022 and December 2023. At the time, it was BYD's largest recall to date. The issue involves a defect in the production of the electric power steering column assembly (CEPS) controller. When the tool cover is closed, it may press against internal components, causing tiny cracks. Over time, these cracks may expand and lead to short circuits, overheating, or fires. BYD dealers would install insulation pads on the controllers to eliminate the safety risk.

== Safety ==
Euro NCAP test results BYD Dolphin (LHD) (2023)
| Test | Points | % |
|---|---|---|
| Overall: | 5 /5 stars | |
| Adult occupant: | 35.8 | 89% |
| Child occupant: | 43 | 87% |
| Pedestrian: | 53.9 | 85% |
| Safety assist: | 14.4 | 79% |

ANCAP test results BYD DOLPHIN (2023, aligned with Euro NCAP)
| Test | Points | % |
|---|---|---|
| Overall: | 5 /5 stars | |
| Adult occupant: | 35.81 | 89% |
| Child occupant: | 42.43 | 86% |
| Pedestrian: | 53.65 | 85% |
| Safety assist: | 14.04 | 77% |

Latin NCAP 3.5 test results BYD Dolphin Plus + 7 Airbags (2024, similar to Euro NCAP 2017)
| Test | Points | % |
|---|---|---|
| Overall: | 5 /5 stars | |
| Adult occupant: | 37.04 | 93% |
| Child occupant: | 45.65 | 93% |
| Pedestrian: | 36.97 | 77% |
| Safety assist: | 36.63 | 85% |

== Awards ==
BYD Dolphin won the title of 'Best Small Electric Car' at the Carbuyer Best Car Awards 2024.

In March 2024, BYD Dolphin won the Japan EV of the Year 2023 award.

== Sales ==
| Year | Sales | | | | | | Total production |
| Year | China | Thailand (Note: Figures based on registration (Thailand)) | Malaysia (Note: Figures based on registration (Malaysia)) | Australia | Brazil | Indonesia | Total production |
|---|---|---|---|---|---|---|---|
| 2021 | 29,598 | | | | | | |
| 2022 | 204,674 | | | | | | 205,417 |
| 2023 | 299,708 | 9,410 | 1,313 | 925 | 6,812 | | 367,419 |
| 2024 | 160,594 | 13,386 | 1,431 | 2,116 | 15,202 | 1,186 | 198,320 |
| 2025 | 160,745 | 12,435 | 87 | | 15,238 | | |

== See also ==
- List of BYD Auto vehicles
