= Soul Collector =

Mythological character

Soul collector is a figure in mythology, folklore, religion, and fiction that gathers, guides, transports, judges, or otherwise takes possession of the souls of the dead. Examples include the Grim Reaper, psychopomps such as Hermes and Anubis, angels of death, and various supernatural beings associated with the transition between life and death.

== History ==
The concept of beings associated with the dead dates back to some of the earliest recorded religions. Ancient civilizations developed myths describing supernatural figures who accompanied, protected, judged, or received the dead after death.

In ancient Egypt, such roles were associated with deities including Anubis, while Greek traditions featured figures such as Charon and Hermes. Similar concepts appeared throughout the ancient Near East, ancient Asia, ancient Europe, and the Americas.

During the medieval period, European artistic and religious traditions increasingly personified death as a single figure, contributing to later depictions such as the Grim Reaper. The idea has since become a recurring theme in folklore, literature, film, and popular culture.

== See also ==
- Grim Reaper
- Psychopomp
- Angel of Death
- Anubis
- Charon
- Personification of Death
