= Old Europe =

Old Europe or Old European may refer to:

- Old Europe (archaeology) (c. 6500 – c. 2800 BC), a culture of Neolithic Europe
- Old European languages, the mostly unknown languages that were spoken in Europe prior to the spread of the Indo-European and Uralic families
- Old European script, Vinča symbols
- Old European hydronymy (c. 2500 – c. 1500 BC), in Central and Western Europe
- "Old Europe", a term for pre-modern (i.e. pre-1800) European history coined by Austrian historian Otto Brunner
- "Old Europe" (politics), used by former U.S. Secretary of Defense Donald Rumsfeld
- Old Europe, New Europe, Core Europe, a book

== See also ==
- Ancient Europe (disambiguation)
- History of Europe
- New Europe (disambiguation)
