= Grim Reaper =

Popular personification of death

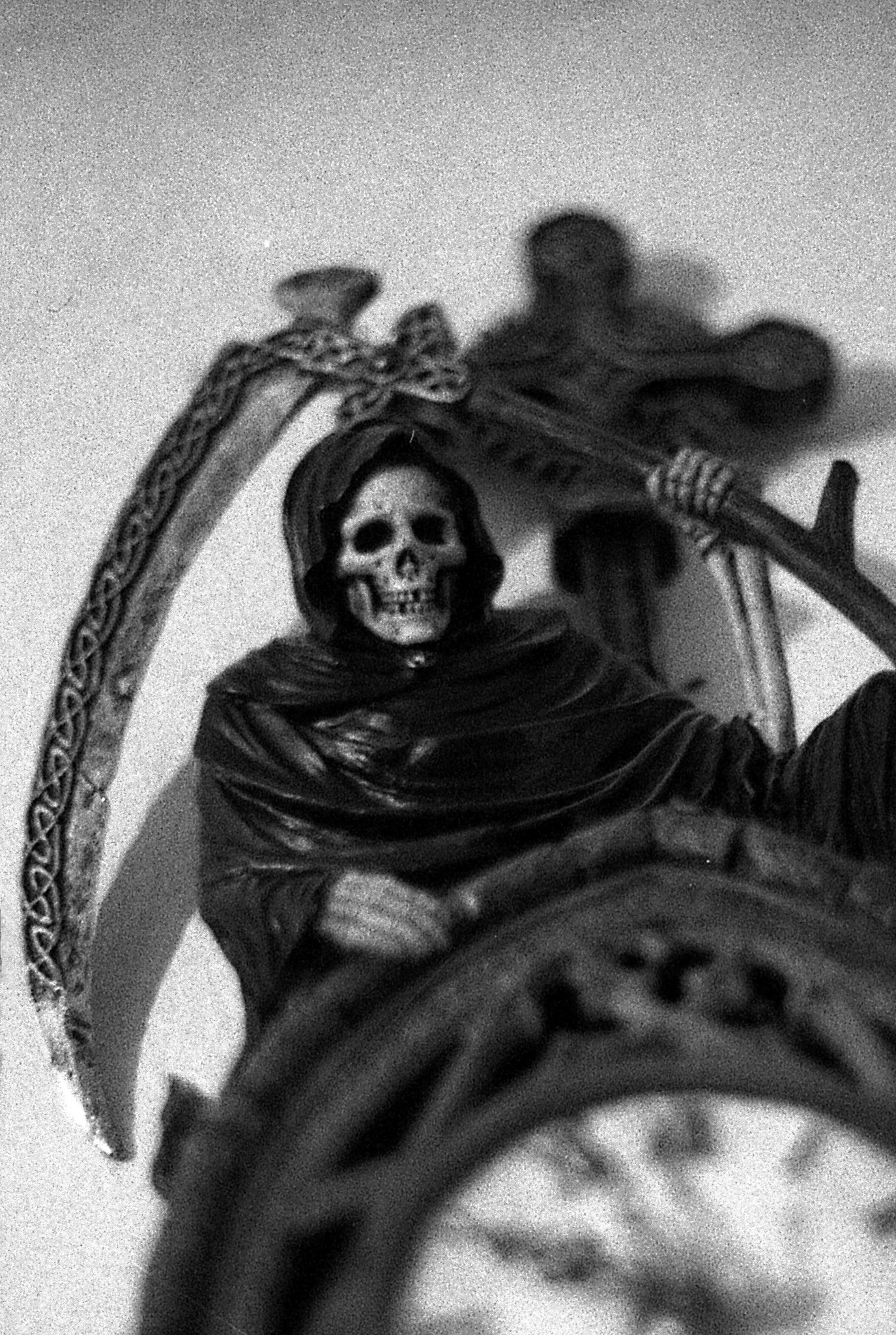
A Mexican Santa Muerte figurine with a conventional Grim Reaper appearance.

The Grim Reaper is a popular personification of death in Western culture in the form of a hooded skeletal figure wearing a black robe and carrying a scythe.

Since the 14th century, European art connected each of these various physical features to death, though the name "Grim Reaper" and the artistic popularity of all the features combined emerged as late as the 19th century. Sometimes, particularly when winged, the character is equated with the Angel of Death.

The scythe as an artistic symbol of death has deliberate agricultural associations since the medieval period due to the importance of farming and seasons. The tool symbolizes the removal of human souls from their bodies in huge numbers, with the analogy being to a farmer (reaper) cutting through large swaths of grain crops during harvest. A Grim Reaper is a soul collector, a common type of stock character in mythology, folklore, and storytelling.

== History ==
The Grim Reaper is a modern blend of various medieval or older European personifications of death, with its earliest direct inputs evident in art of 14th-century Europe, mostly in connection with the Black Death (bubonic plague) pandemic then ravaging the continent. Romance language cultures, like in Italy and France, traditionally tend to imagine death as female, while Slavic and Germanic language cultures, including English culture, tend to imagine death as male. Time and the harvest were already artistically connected with death in the medieval period.

=== 14th century ===
From Italy to England in the late Middle Ages, death was popularly depicted in art with one or multiple animate skeletons. Several "Triumph of Death" paintings from Italy in the 14th century show such skeletal characters, as well as death in the form of a long-haired woman-like figure with wings carrying a scythe. The latter figure is most famously characterized in a Camposanto Monumentale fresco believed to have been painted even before the Black Death in 1347. A female horseback rider killing humans with an outstretched weapon is another common symbol for mass die-offs in this era.

=== 15th through 17th centuries ===
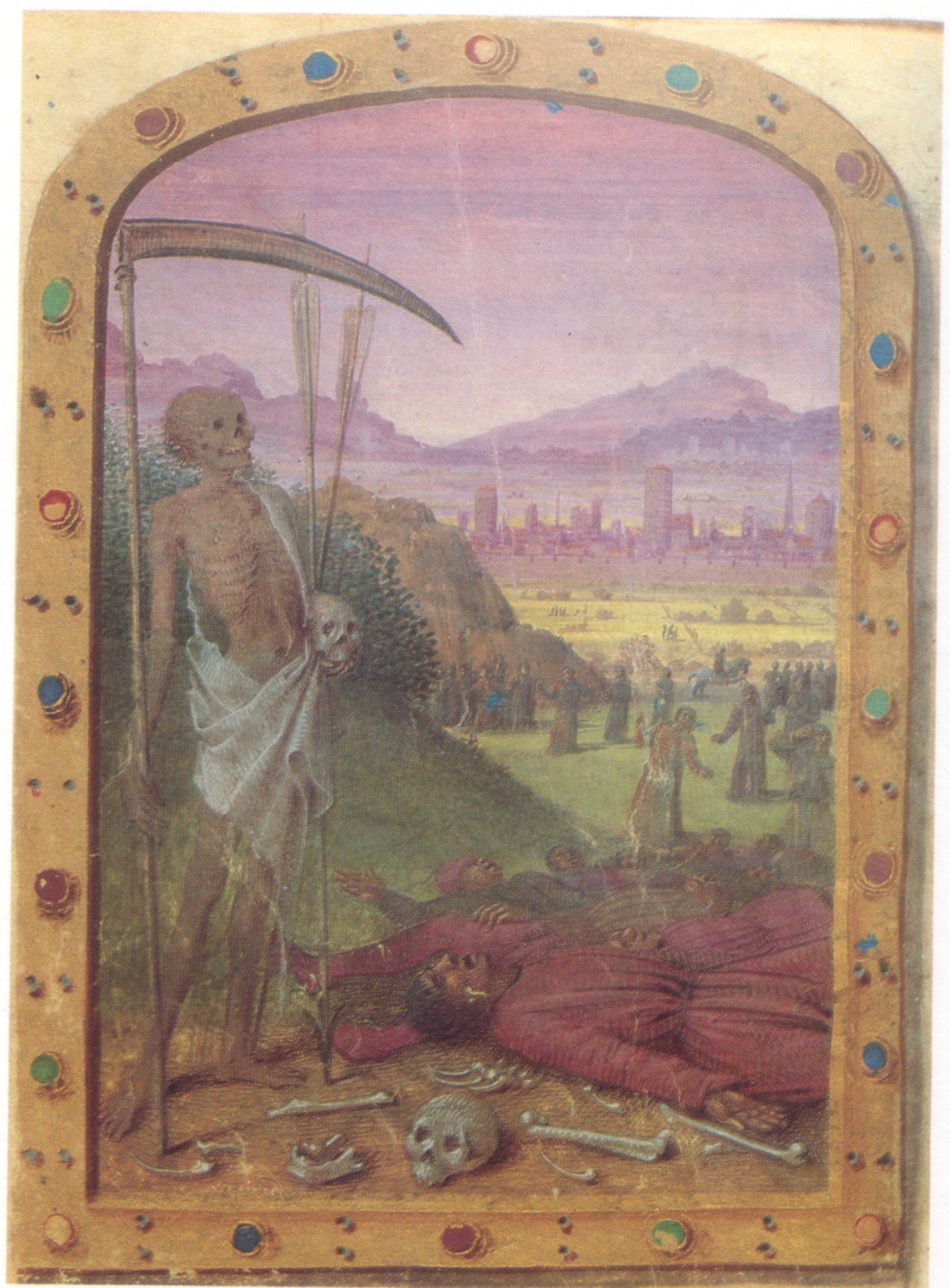
One of the oldest paintings with conventional "Grim Reaper" elements: a skeletal character with a scythe (circa 1460, by Jean Fouquet).

Italian Renaissance painter Francesco Pesellino characterized a feminine-looking, corpse-like standing figure of death with a scythe in his "Triumphs of Love, Chastity, and Death", created around 1450. The 15th century also popularized the motif of the Danse Macabre, a group of dancing skeletons leading people to their graves: another possible input for the later Grim Reaper image.

During the Renaissance, artists began combining the features of skeletons and scythes together, possibly further inspired by the ancient Greek deity Chronos, god of time, and the similarly-named Cronus, a Greek Titan associated with the harvest, both of whom are known for wielding a scythe or sickle. Thanatos, the Greek god of death, may also be related, though he has few physical features of note. German Renaissance artist Albrecht Dürer crafted a variety of personifications of death, often emaciated or corpse-like old men. However, in one 1505 charcoal drawing he presents a crowned skeleton (a motif of the era sometimes called "King Death") riding a horse and holding a scythe. Netherlandish Renaissance artist Pieter Bruegel the Elder painted an apocalyptic scene with multiple characters showcasing the combined features, some on horseback and some wearing white togas or sheets, in his Triumph of Death panel painting, dating from about 1562. A wooden figurine in an English church from 1640 portrayed a hooded and robed skeleton carrying a scythe and hourglass.

=== 19th century ===
The color black for the Grim Reaper's clothing may be as recent as the 19th century, related to the wearing of black at funerals. The full Grim Reaper appearance (hooded skeleton, black robe, and scythe) has become common only since the mid-19th century, for instance as described in multiple Edgar Allan Poe short stories. The Ghost of Christmas Yet to Come has a similar look in the classic 1843 novella A Christmas Carol by Charles Dickens: silent and wearing a black cloak that conceals its whole face and body, with its only visible body part being a single gesturing hand.

The term "Grim Reaper" only first emerged in English print in the 1840s.

== In modern media ==
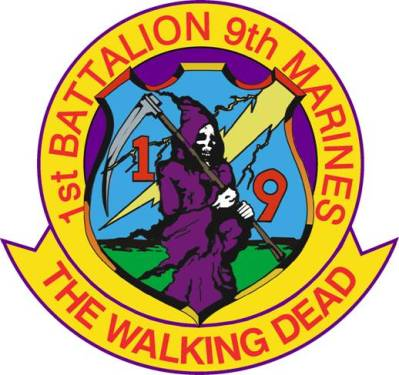
The Grim Reaper on the insignia of the US 1st Battalion, 9th Marines.

The Reaper has been variously portrayed in modern media ranging from books to films to television series to songs, in works of drama, comedy, and horror.

Death, hooded with a pale man's face, is a prominent character in Ingmar Bergman's 1957 film The Seventh Seal.

An archetypal Grim Reaper appears in Terry Pratchett's 1980s–2010s fantasy comedy series of novels Discworld (simply named Death); the 1991 science-fantasy comedy film Bill & Ted's Bogus Journey; the 1998 video game Grim Fandango; and the 2000s animated television series The Grim Adventures of Billy & Mandy.

The traditional character also makes occasional appearances as Death in the ongoing animated comedy series Family Guy, initially voiced by Norm Macdonald in his first appearance before being replaced by Adam Carolla.
