= Ancient Europe =

The expression Ancient Europe may be used in a variety of senses:

- The ancient concept of Europa in Greek geography, in origin "the landmass adjacent to Thrace"
  - Europa (ancient geography)
  - Europa (Roman province), in the Diocese of Thrace
- The territory of Europe (the continent according to its modern definition) in "ancient times":
  - Prehistoric Europe, human presence in Europe before recorded history
    - Neolithic Europe, 7000 BCE to 1700 BCE
    - Bronze Age Europe
    - Iron Age Europe
      - Roman imperial period (chronology)
      - Roman Iron Age
  - The territories of Europe participating in Classical antiquity
    - Ancient Greece
    - Ancient Rome
    - Illyria
    - Hellenistic period, emergence of the Roman Empire
    - Roman Empire, the post-Roman Republic period
    - Late antiquity, from classical antiquity to the Middle Ages

== See also ==
- Old Europe (disambiguation)
- Ancient history § Europe
- History of Europe
