= New European =

New European, may refer to either:

- The New European, a weekly pop-up newspaper published in 2016
- New European Recordings, a music label of Douglas Pearce
