= Paul Tan =

Malaysian motoring journalist

- Born: Paulvinder Tan Teck Kheong; 27 October 1984 (age 42); Kuantan, Pahang, Malaysia
- Education: Victoria Institution
- Occupation: Motoring journalist
- Spouse: Jenny Phang (m. 2012)
- Website: Paul Tan's Automotive News

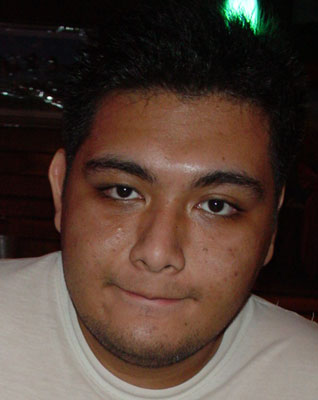
Paul Tan in 2007

Paul Tan (born 27 October 1984) is a Malaysian motoring journalist. He is best known for his website, paultan.org or Paul Tan's Automotive News, a popular news portal which covers the Malaysian & ASEAN automotive scenes. Paultan.org is managed by Driven Communications Sdn. Bhd., a company in which Paul Tan assumes the role as a managing director. The website also offers reviews, previews, test drives and covers various other topics that are automotive-related.

Established in 2004, paultan.org enjoyed a quick rise to fame. His website was the basis for the television programme in 2010 called Driven which ran for four seasons.

== Career ==
Paul Tan's career in automotive journalism has its roots in his childhood. Paul was not born into a privileged family. While Paul was studying at the Victoria Institution in Kuala Lumpur, his father had contracted cancer. Paul was forced into adversity at an early age and had to take several jobs to earn extra money for his family, which included his mother, a housewife, and a brother, who was four years younger. Paul worked as an intern in G-LabWorks Sdn Bhd between November and December 2000, where he exercised his HTML and JavaScript skills. For the first six months of 2001, he worked as a web developer at AMP Radio Networks (currently known as Astro Radio). He led a team of 3 other web developers for the Xfresh Teen Community online portal at www.xfresh.com. Paul also designed a bus wrap which promoted the Xfresh website on Intrakota buses. In 2001, Paul graduated with his Sijil Pelajaran Malaysia (SPM) certificate in the Science stream.

After graduating, Paul Tan enrolled in an I.T.-related degree in HELP University, Damansara Heights. However, when Paul was 19, his father died, forcing Paul to drop out of college to find a full-time job in an effort to pay the bills and his brother's education. Paul's first attempt at entrepreneurship came in the form of his 2003 employment at Hulk Solutions Sdn. Bhd. as Chief technology officer (CTO). He was responsible for managing Hulk Solution's information system resources, which included the maintenance of a rack server used for applications hosting in the Telekom Malaysia Internet Data Centre (TMIDC) in Cyberjaya. Paul coded on the LAMP platform and his clients included well-known names such as The Star, The Malay Mail, Monsoon Cup and Peugeot.

It was during Paul's tenure at Hulk Solutions that the idea of paultan.org developed. Initially starting out as a personal WordPress-based blog about the Malaysian automotive industry, Paul quickly recognised the potential of the platform when internet traffic to his blog began to grow over the months. By 2006, paultan.org had become a popular news portal in Malaysia, and with the use of Google AdSense, it was generating an income of between RM5,000 to 6,000 per month. The term 'paultan' was also among the most frequently searched in the 'persons category' by Malaysian Google users according to Google's 2007 Malaysia Year-End Zeitgeist.

With the continued rise of paultan.org, came a demand for a Malaysian motoring television show. During Paul's years in secondary school, he had become close friends with Harvinder Singh Sidhu. In 2008, Paul approached Harvinder, who had then just completed his diploma in UCSI University, Cheras, with the proposition of a television show. After careful consideration, both Paul and Harvinder came together and incorporated Driven Media Sdn. Bhd. (now known as Driven Communications Sdn. Bhd.) in October 2008. Initially, Driven Media was exclusively run and staffed by the two friends, but later grew to five or six staff after the unveil of a motoring television programme called Driven. The show was created for two reasons, according to Paul; the first was simply because there were no credible motoring television shows in Malaysia, at that period in time. The second was that the Driven show would lend significant legitimacy to the paultan.org website, which prior to the show, was often overlooked and underestimated by the mainstream media and automobile companies. They viewed paultan.org as a personal blog, and Paul Tan as a blogger. This image perception issue further catalysed the development of the Driven show, which finally materialised in early 2010, after the shooting process was completed in 2009. Driven Media Sdn. Bhd. found a sponsor, developed a dedicated website and booked airtime on 8TV (a national television channel), during Sunday nights, for broadcasting. On 11 April 2010, the first episode from the first season went live, and the final episode concluded on the 4th of July that same year. Driven was later renewed for a second season, spanning between 19 November 2013 and 17 December 2013 respectively.

As of the 2010s, Paul has shifted the scope of paultan.org to encompass the entire Southeast Asian or ASEAN region, where the website was formerly focused predominantly on the Malaysian automotive scene. Unlike most Malaysian mainstream motoring media which focus largely on topics relating to Malaysia, the crew of paultan.org actively travel to neighbouring ASEAN countries to cover local developments, motor shows and car reviews among others. Their efforts give paultan.org an edge in the sense that the website serves up original content and news faster than other mainstream motoring media in Malaysia. Paul has also iterated that paultan.org will never compromise on content, independence, objectivity and credibility for additional revenue from advertisers, as the crew values their readers and their comments respectively.

== Driven Communications ==
In 2008, Driven Communications was exclusively staffed by Paul Tan and his close friend, Harvinder Singh Sidhu. After the inception of the Driven programme, the staff grew to a count of 5 or 6. By October 2012, there were a total of 24 staff, which later grew to 35 in February 2014 respectively. Driven Communications generated RM6 million in revenue for 2013, which is a 50% increase over 2012. The company has targeted RM8 million in revenue for 2014. In February 2014, the Malaysian Digital Association (MDA) and comScore named paultan.org the 6th most popular website in Malaysia.
