= Nouvelle Europe =

France-based organization

Nouvelle Europe is a Paris-based organization founded in 2003 by Philippe Perchoc, a researcher at the European Parliament and lecturer at College of Europe and Université catholique de Louvain, and by Thomas Kurkdjian, a French civil servant.

Nouvelle Europe organizes regular conferences, debates and so-called s(t)imulation seminars with school classes to simulate the European Parliament or the Council of the European Union. Their events – which mostly take place in Paris, but also in cities such as Istanbul, Kaliningrad or Dnipro – cover topics related to the EU and its neighbourhood, with a particular focus on Central and Eastern Europe (such as the Visegrád Group), since Nouvelle Europe was born out of the motivation to foster greater understanding of the countries covered by the 2004 enlargement of the European Union.

The name Nouvelle Europe, which is French for 'New Europe', refers to this geographical region of Central and Eastern Europe, and is a term coined by Czech statesman and philosopher Tomáš Garrigue Masaryk.

Many of Nouvelle Europe's events are co-sponsored by the European Parliament, Sorbonne University, Sciences Po, Arte, Radio France Internationale and other institutions.

== Online-Journal ==
Nouvelle Europe has an online journal in both French and, since 2010, in English. As it bases many of its journalistic articles on findings and discussions from academic political science, it is since 2017 tracked by Altmetric.

It has conducted and published various interviews with notable personalities from academia, politics and diplomacy, including:

- Benoit d’Aboville (French ambassador to NATO)
- Renaud Dehousse (President of the European University Institute)
- Leonidas Donskis (MEP from Lithuania)
- Caspar Einem (former minister in Austria and vice-president of the European Forum Alpbach)
- Grzegorz Ekiert (professor at Harvard University)
- Simon Hix (professor at LSE)
- Alaksandar Milinkievič (opposition politician in Belarus)
- Timothy Snyder from Yale University
