= New European Driving Cycle =

Technical standard

The New European Driving Cycle (NEDC) was a driving cycle, last updated in 1997, designed to assess the emission levels of car engines and fuel economy in passenger cars (which excludes light trucks and commercial vehicles). It is also referred to as MVEG cycle (Motor Vehicle Emissions Group).

The NEDC, which is supposed to represent the typical usage of a car in Europe, is repeatedly criticised for delivering economy-figures which are unachievable in reality. It consists of four repeated ECE-15 urban driving cycles (UDC) and one Extra-Urban driving cycle (EUDC). The WLTP test cycle replaced NEDC for vehicles approved for sale in Europe after September 2018, and all published figures for vehicles on sale after January 2019 should use WLTP fuel economy figures

The NEDC test procedure is defined in UNECE R101 for the measurement of CO_{2} and fuel consumption and/or the measurement of electric energy consumption and electric range in hybrid and fully electric M1 and N1 vehicles, and UNECE R83 for the measurement of emission of pollutants of M, N1 and M2 vehicles. It was maintained by the UNECE World Forum for Harmonization of Vehicle Regulations (WP.29), which also worked on its successor, the Worldwide harmonized Light vehicles Test Procedures (WLTP).

Although originally designed for petrol-based road vehicles, the driving cycle is now also used for diesel vehicles and to estimate the electric power consumption and driving range of hybrid and battery electric vehicles.

== History ==
UNECE regulation 15 has become obsolete with introduction of UNECE regulation 83 related to "emission of pollutants according to engine fuel requirements".

== Measurements ==
=== UN Regulation 101 ===
Several measurements are usually performed along the cycle. The figures made available to the general public are:

- Urban fuel economy (first 780 seconds)
- Extra-Urban fuel economy (780 to 1180 seconds)
- Overall fuel economy (complete cycle)
- CO_{2} emission (complete cycle)

The following parameters are also generally measured to validate the compliance to European emission standards:

- Carbon monoxide
- Unburnt hydrocarbons
- Nitrogen oxides
- Particulate matter

=== UN Regulation 83 ===
Some or all of the following parameters are measured depending upon the requirements of the region implementing the test:

- Mass of carbon monoxide (CO)
- Mass of total hydrocarbons (THC)
- Mass of nonmethane hydrocarbons (NMHC)
- Mass of oxides of nitrogen (NO_{x})
- Combined mass of hydrocarbons and oxides of nitrogen (THC + NO_{x})
- Mass of particulate matter (PM)
- Number of particulates (PN)

The region implementing the test defines limits for each of the pollutants, for instance the Euro level within the EU.

== Test procedure ==
The cycle must be performed on a cold vehicle at 20–30 °C (typically run at 25 °C). The cycles may be performed on a flat road, in the absence of wind. However, to improve repeatability, they are generally performed on a roller test bench. This type of bench is equipped with an electrical machine to emulate resistance due to aerodynamic drag and vehicle mass (inertia).

For each vehicle configuration, a look-up table is applied: each speed corresponds to a certain value of resistance (reverse torque applied to the drive wheels). This arrangement enables the use of a single physical vehicle to test all vehicle body styles (Sedan, hatchback, MPV etc.) by simply changing the look-up table. A fan is coupled to the roller bench to provide the vehicle air intakes with an airflow matching the current speed. Many more tests can be performed during vehicle development with this arrangement than with conventional road tests.

The test is conducted with all ancillary loads turned off (Air conditioning compressor and fan, lights, heated rear window, etc.)

=== Urban driving Cycle ===
The NEDC is composed of two parts: ECE-15 (Urban Driving Cycle), repeated 4 times, is plotted from 0 s to 780 s; EUDC cycle is plotted from 780 s to 1180 s

The Urban Driving Cycle ECE-15 (or just UDC) was introduced first in 1970 as part of ECE vehicle regulations; the recent version is defined by ECE R83, R84 and R101. The cycle has been designed to represent typical driving conditions of busy European cities, and is characterized by low engine load, low exhaust gas temperature, and a maximum speed of 50 km/h.

When the engine starts, the car pauses for 11 s - if equipped with a manual gearbox, 6 s in neutral (with clutch engaged) and 5 s in the 1st gear (with clutch disengaged) - then slowly accelerates to 15 km/h in 4 s, cruises at constant speed for 8 s, brakes to a full stop in 5 s (manual: last 3 s with clutch disengaged), then stops for 21 s (manual: 16 s in neutral, then 5 s in the 1st gear).

At 49 s, the car slowly accelerates to 32 km/h in 12 s (manual: 5 s in 1st gear, 2 s gear change, then 5 s in the 2nd gear), cruises for 24 s, slowly brakes to a full stop in 11 s (manual: last 3 s with clutch disengaged), then pauses for another 21 s (manual: 16 s in neutral, 5 s in the 1st gear).

At 117 s, the car slowly accelerates to 50 km/h in 26 s (manual: 5 s, 9 s and 8 s in the 1st, 2nd and 3rd gears, with additional 2 × 2 s for gear changes), cruises for 12 s, decelerates to 35 km/h in 8 s, cruises for another 13 s, brakes to a full stop in 12 s (manual: 2 s change to the 2nd gear, 7 s in the 2nd gear, last 3 s with clutch disengaged), then pauses for 7 s (manual: in neutral with clutch engaged).

The cycle ends on 195 s after a theoretical distance of 994.03 meters, then it repeats four consecutive times. Total duration is 780 s (13 minutes) over a theoretical distance of 3976.1 meters, with an average speed of 18.35 km/h.

=== Extra-urban driving Cycle ===
The Extra-Urban Driving Cycle EUDC, introduced by ECE R101 in 1990, has been designed to represent more aggressive, high speed driving modes. The maximum speed of the EUDC cycle is 120 km/h; low-powered vehicles are limited to 90 km/h.

After a 20 s stop - if equipped with manual gearbox, in the 1st gear with clutch disengaged - the car slowly accelerates to 70 km/h in 41 s (manual: 5 s, 9 s, 8 s and 13 s in the 1st, 2nd, 3rd and 4th gears, with additional 3 × 2 s for gear changes), cruises for 50 s (manual: in the 5th gear [sic]), decelerates to 50 km/h in 8 s (manual: 4 s in the 5th and 4 s in the 4th gear [sic]) and cruises for 69 s, then slowly accelerates to 70 km/h in 13 s .

At 201 s, the car cruises at 70 km/h for 50 s (manual: in the 5th gear), then slowly accelerates to 100 km/h in 35 s and cruises for 30 s (manual: in the 5th or 6th gear).

Finally, at 316 s the car slowly accelerates to 120 km/h in 20 s, cruises for 10 s, then slowly brakes to a full stop in 34 s (manual: in the 5th or 6th gear, last 10 s with clutch disengaged), and idles for another 20 s (manual: in neutral).

Total duration is 400 s (6 minutes 40 s seconds) and theoretical distance is 6956 meters, with an average speed of 62.6 km/h.

=== Combined ===
The combined fuel economy is calculated by a total consumption of urban and extra-urban cycles over the total distance (theoretical 10932 meters). The total test time amounts to 1180 s with an average speed of 33.35 km/h. Sometimes the NEDC is also quoted at 1220 s, which includes the initial 40 s with the vehicle at standstill and combustion engine off.

== Criticism ==
=== Inability to represent real-life driving ===
The NEDC was conceived when European vehicles were lighter and less powerful. The test offers a stylized driving speed pattern with low accelerations, constant speed cruises, and many idling events. However, accelerations are much steeper and variable in practice, which is in part caused by the power surplus of modern engines as the 0–100 km/h (0–62 mph) average-time decreased from 14 seconds in 1981 to 9 seconds in 2007. In 1998, a Swedish researcher criticized the NEDC standard for allowing large emission differences between test and reality.

The UK consumer group Which?, criticized the NEDC test procedure as being out-of-date as its most recent update was made in 1997; before hybrid cars and stop-start technology was generally available. The group claimed the test did not replicate real-world driving conditions and had numerous loopholes which cause the results to be unachievable in practice. It was also claimed that no official body polices the tests and the vehicle manufacturers can arbitrarily reduce their results by 4% at the end of the cycle. Weaknesses noted are: (i) that tests are not necessarily repeatable and comparable; (ii) the test-cycle does not include sustained motorway driving; (iii) test-cycles can be performed using optional economy settings which will not typically be selected by drivers; (iv) the test-cycle is performed with ancillary equipment such an air-conditioning and heated windows switched off; (v) the tests can be conducted at 2 km/h (1.2 mph) below the required speed thus using less fuel; (vi) roof-rails and passenger door-mirror can be removed for the test, to reduce drag; (vii) tyre inflation for the test can be set above the recommended pressure values to artificially reduce rolling resistance.

=== Cycle beating ===
For the emission standards to deliver real emission reductions it is crucial to use a test cycle that reflects real-world driving style. However, the fixed speeds, gear shift points and accelerations of the NEDC offer possibilities for manufacturers to engage in what is called 'cycle beating' to optimise engine emission performance to the corresponding operating points of the test cycle, while emissions from typical driving conditions would be much higher than expected, undermining the standards and public health. In one particular instance, research from two German technology institutes found that for diesel cars no 'real' NO_{x} reductions have been achieved after 13 years of stricter standards.

=== Other deceptions ===
It is alleged that, under NEDC, some automakers overinflate tires, adjusting or disconnecting brakes to reduce friction, and taping cracks between body panels and windows to reduce air resistance, some go as far as removing wing mirrors, to inflate measured fuel economy and lower measured carbon emission.

In addition, the height of the simulated wind fan could alter the performance of after-treatment systems due to changes in temperature and, consequently, modify the pollutant emissions values.

== Successors ==
UNECE World Forum for Harmonization of Vehicle Regulations developed a new global harmonized driving cycle, the World Light Test Procedure (WLTP) to more closely reflect real-world driving conditions, with higher average and top speeds than the NEDC, steeper acceleration and deceleration, and simulation of more road types. Since September 2019 it has been mandatory for light duty vehicles (i.e. passenger cars and light commercial vans) in the EU, and mandatory in Japan since September 2021. China adopted a domestically-developed standard, the China Light-Duty Vehicle Test Cycle, to replace NEDC in the country.

== See also ==
- EPA Federal Test Procedure, commonly known as FTP-75
- Worldwide Harmonised Light Vehicles Test Procedure
- China Light-Duty Vehicle Test Cycle
