= BYD Yuan Plus =

Battery electric compact crossover SUV

Overview
- Manufacturer: BYD Auto
- Production: February 2022 – present

Body and chassis
- Class: Compact SUV (C-segment)
- Body style: 5-door crossover SUV

Chronology
- Predecessor: BYD Yuan

The BYD Yuan Plus (Chinese: 比亚迪元PLUS) is a battery electric compact SUV manufactured by BYD Auto. Part of the BYD Yuan series named after the Yuan dynasty, the Yuan Plus is sold through BYD's Dynasty Network dealerships. Unlike the preceding BYD Yuan, the Yuan Plus is offered exclusively as a battery electric vehicle. The first generation went on sale in February 2022, and a second generation was introduced in April 2026 at the Beijing Auto Show. It is positioned above the Yuan Up (Atto 2).

The first-generation model is exported worldwide, most extensively under the name BYD Atto 3; for many overseas markets, it represents BYD's first electric passenger car offering.

== First generation (SC2E; 2022) ==
First generation
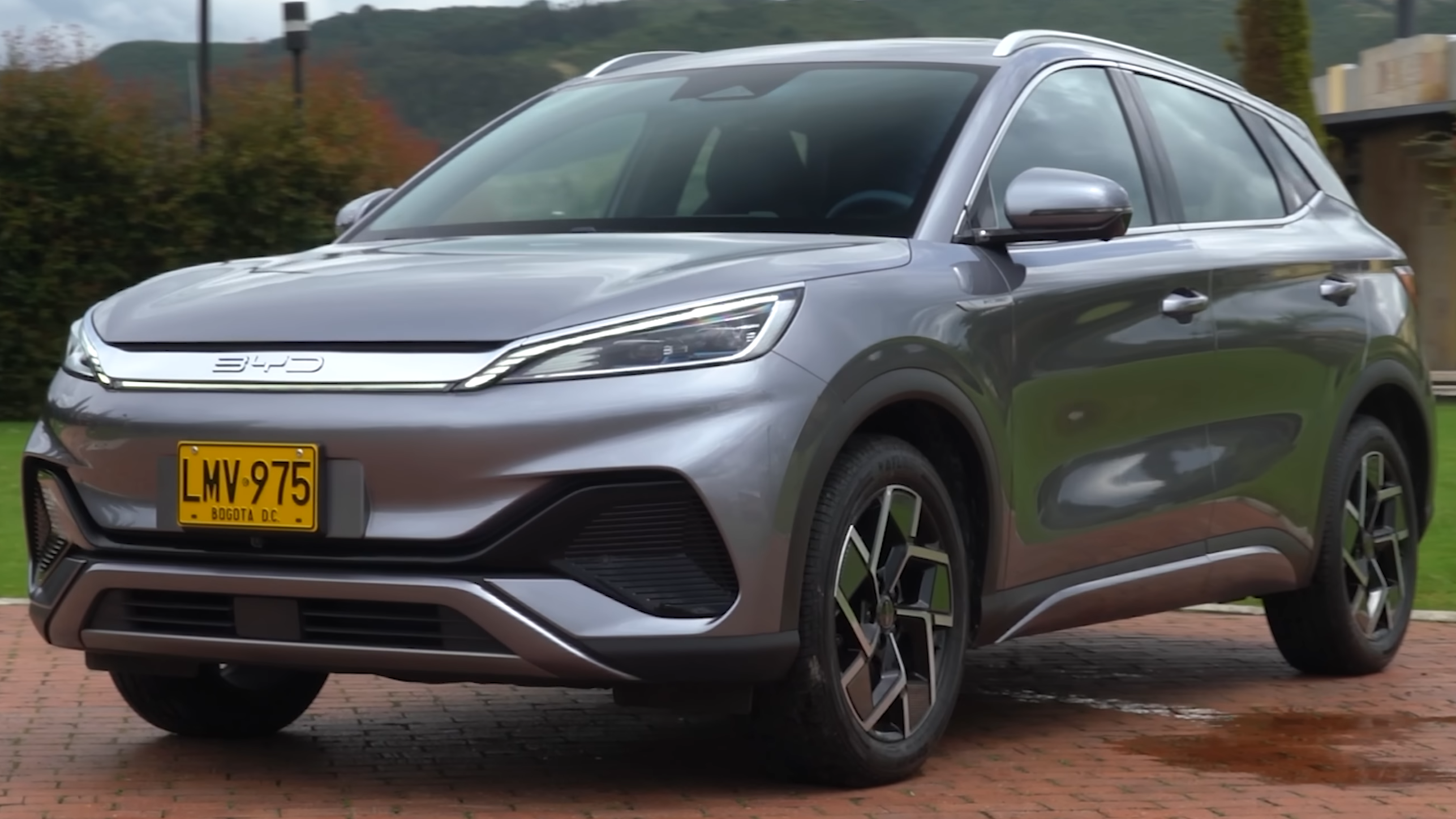

Overview
- Model code: SC2E
- Production: February 2022 – present
- Assembly: China: Changsha, Hunan; Changzhou, Jiangsu; Hefei, Anhui
- Designer: Under the lead of Wolfgang Egger

Body and chassis
- Layout: Front-motor, front-wheel-drive
- Platform: e-Platform 3.0
- Related: BYD Dolphin; BYD Yuan Up

Powertrain
- Electric motor: Permanent magnet synchronous motor
- Power output: 100–150 kW (134–201 hp; 136–204 PS)
- Battery: 49.92 kWh BYD Blade LFP; 60.48 kWh BYD Blade LFP
- Electric range: 430–510 km (267–317 mi) (CLTC)

Dimensions
- Wheelbase: 2,720 mm (107.1 in)
- Length: 4,455 mm (175.4 in)
- Width: 1,875 mm (73.8 in)
- Height: 1,615 mm (63.6 in)
- Kerb weight: 1,615–1,750 kg (3,560–3,858 lb)

The Yuan Plus was first shown in August 2021 at the Chengdu Auto Show and went on sale in China in February 2022, occupying the C-segment compact crossover space, classified domestically as an A-class vehicle. At the same event, BYD announced the model's export name, Atto 3, and confirmed a dedicated production line for right-hand drive markets.

Built on BYD's e-Platform 3.0, the Yuan Plus uses MacPherson strut front suspension and multi-link independent rear suspension. A single front-mounted permanent magnet synchronous motor produces 150 kW (201 hp; 204 PS) and 310 N⋅m (31.6 kg⋅m; 229 lb⋅ft) of torque, paired with either a 49.92 kWh or 60.48 kWh Blade LFP battery pack, providing a claimed CLTC range of 430 km (267 mi) or 510 km (317 mi) respectively.

The interior design draws on fitness-culture aesthetics, with styling elements referencing gym and sports equipment. The centre infotainment display, sized at 12.8 inches or an optional 15.6 inches, runs on Android and can rotate between portrait and landscape orientation.

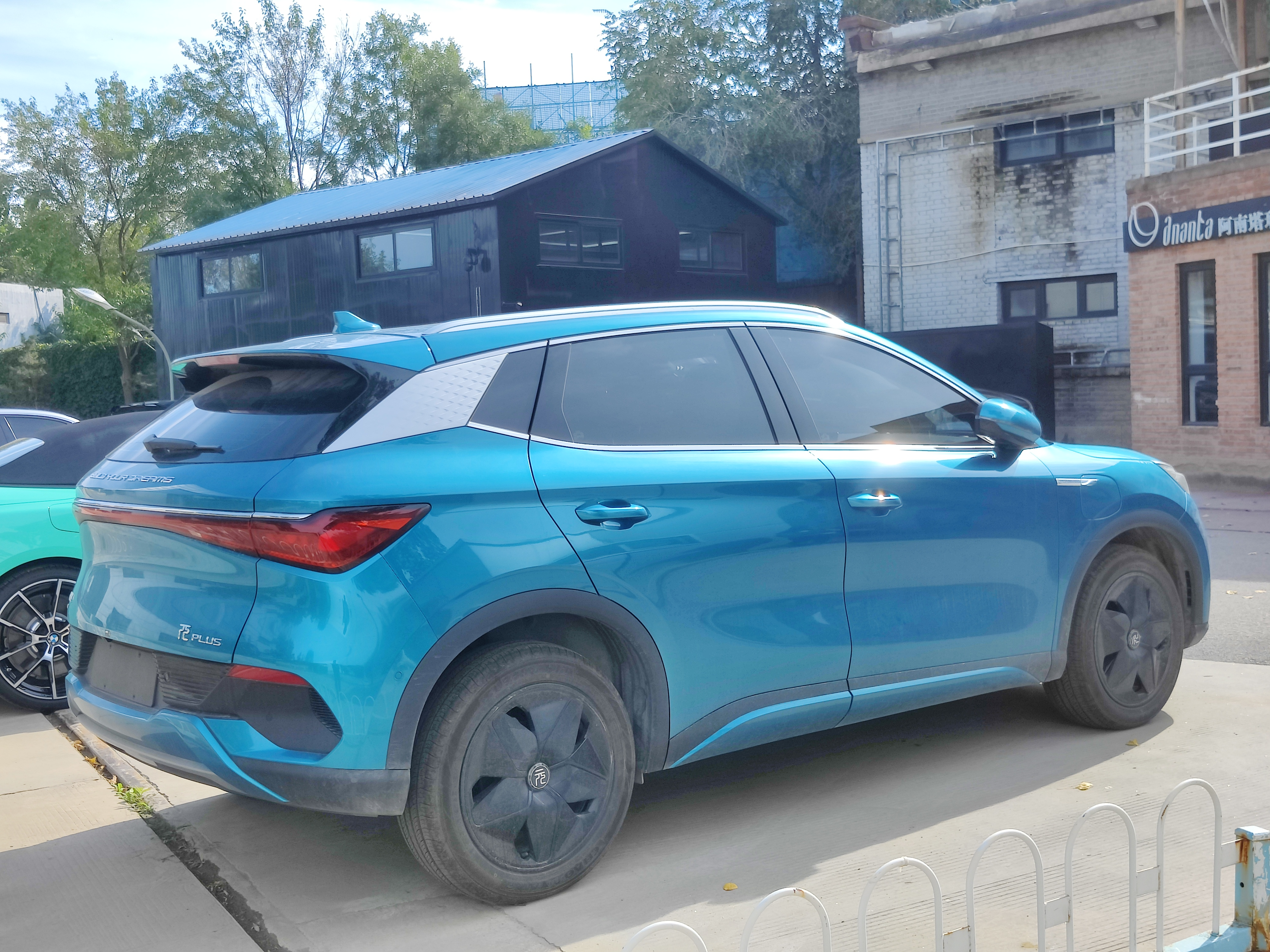
Rear view

=== Running changes ===
In September 2023, the Yuan Plus Champion Edition went on sale in China, introducing price reductions alongside additional equipment such as heated and ventilated front seats, privacy glass, and transparent rendering for the 360-degree camera view. By that month, the model had reached 500,000 cumulative units produced at BYD's Hefei plant, 19 months after launch, with 22 percent of production exported.

An updated Yuan Plus was introduced in China in early 2025 with BYD's "DiPilot" advanced driver-assistance suite. The facelift includes a redesigned front bumper with more prominent air intakes and a silver lower guard plate, revised D-pillar trim, new 17-inch and 18-inch wheel designs, and an updated rear light pattern. The interior received upgraded dashboard and door panel materials. The Intelligent Driving Edition, distinguished by a "DiPilot" badge, incorporates BYD's "God's Eye" C-level intelligent driving system with a 29-sensor suite comprising forward-facing, peripheral, and surround-view cameras alongside millimetre-wave and ultrasonic radar.

On 30 September 2024, BYD recalled 96,714 Dolphin and Yuan Plus vehicles in China, manufactured between November 2022 and December 2023, over a fire risk stemming from a defect in the electric power steering column controller. BYD dealers installed insulation pads on affected controllers to address the issue.

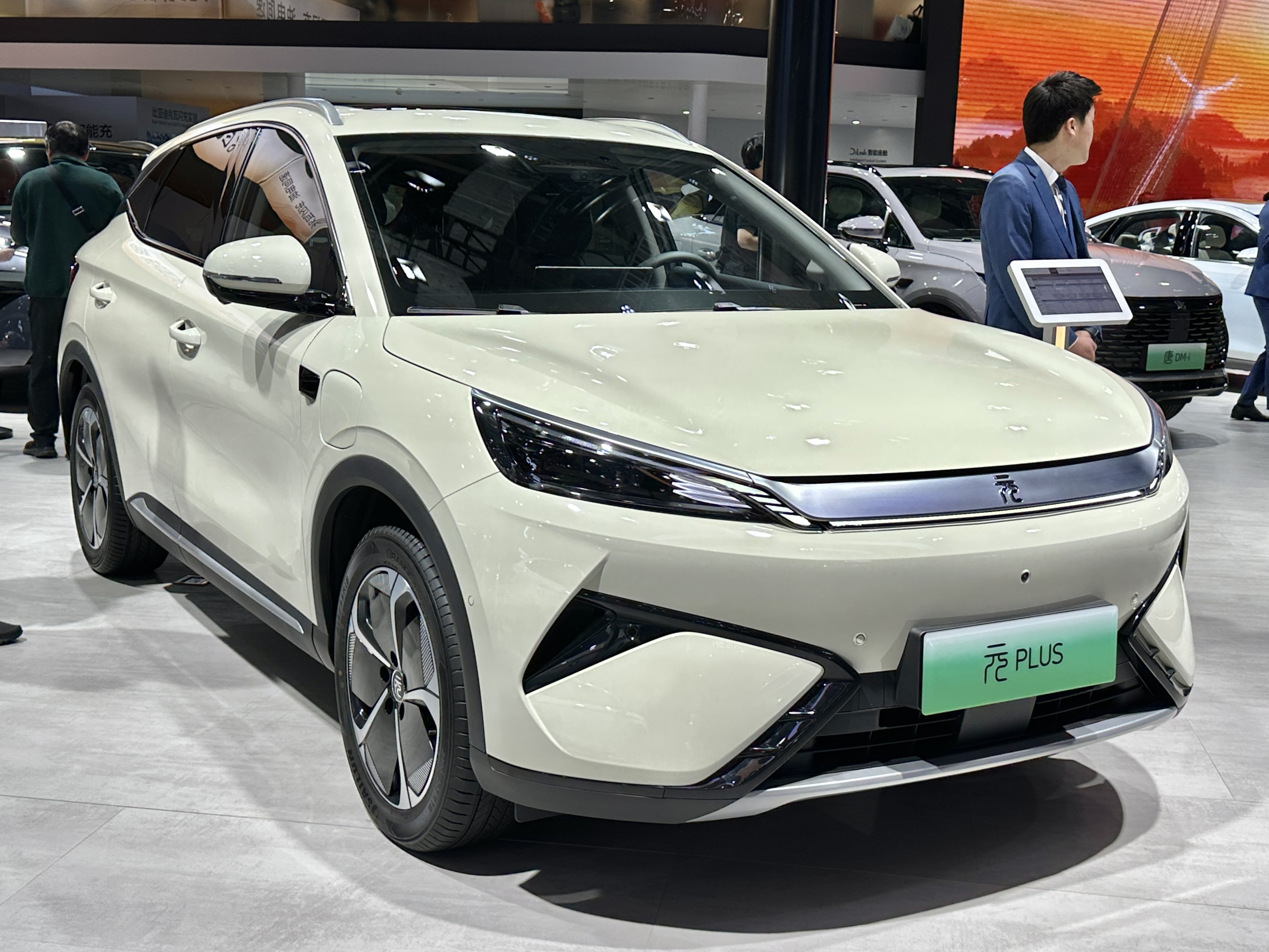
2025 facelift

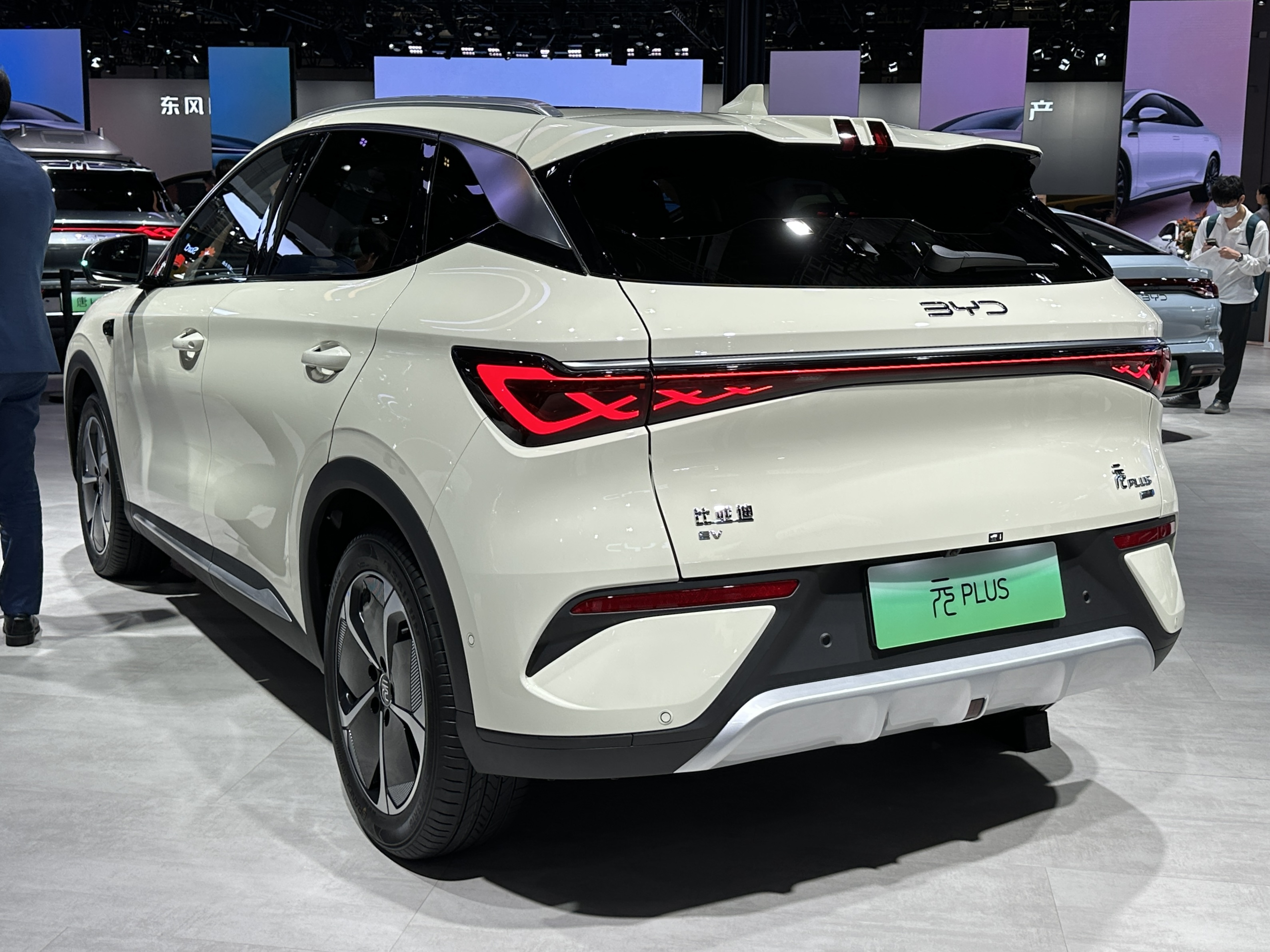
Rear view

== Second generation (SC6E; 2026) ==
Second generation
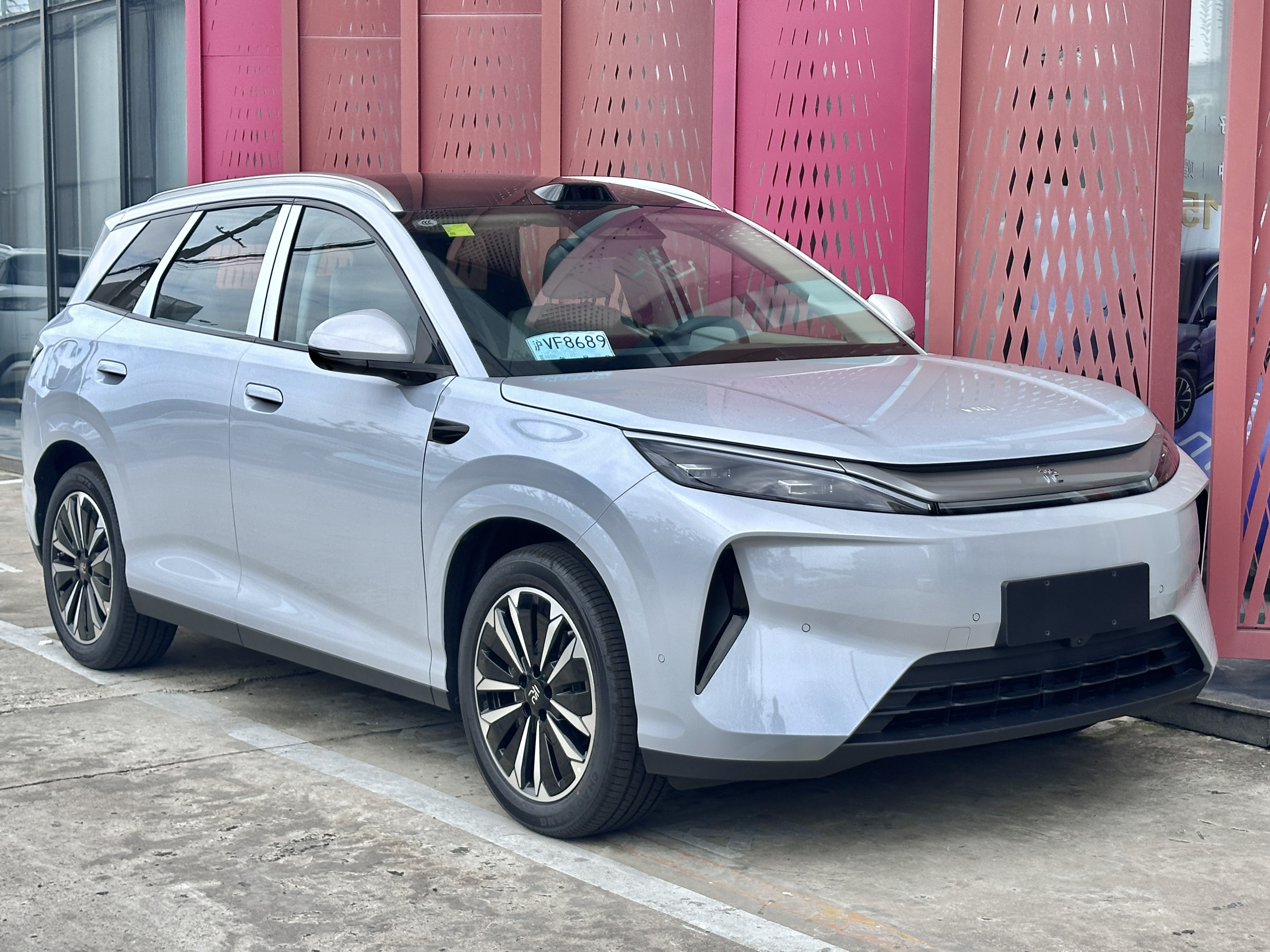

Overview
- Model code: SC6E
- Production: May 2026 – present

Body and chassis
- Layout: Rear-motor, rear-wheel-drive
- Platform: e-Platform 3.0 Evo
- Related: BYD Sealion 05 EV

Powertrain
- Electric motor: TZ200XSBR PMSM
- Power output: 200–240 kW (268–322 hp; 272–326 PS)
- Battery: 57.545 kWh BYD Blade 2.0 LFP; 68.547 kWh BYD Blade 2.0 LFP
- Electric range: 540–630 km (336–391 mi) (CLTC)

Dimensions
- Wheelbase: 2,770 mm (109.1 in)
- Length: 4,665 mm (183.7 in)
- Width: 1,895 mm (74.6 in)
- Height: 1,675 mm (65.9 in)
- Kerb weight: 1,690 kg (3,726 lb)

The second-generation Yuan Plus was unveiled in April 2026 at the Beijing Auto Show. BYD positions it as the "third generation" of the Yuan Plus nameplate. The release of the second-generation model followed a sharp decline in domestic sales of the first-generation Yuan Plus.

The model officially went on sale in China on 21 May 2026 in four trim levels. BYD stated the update offers up to 120 km of additional range over the outgoing generation. According to Lu Tian, general manager of BYD's Dynasty sales network, the model received more than 30,000 orders within its first week on sale.

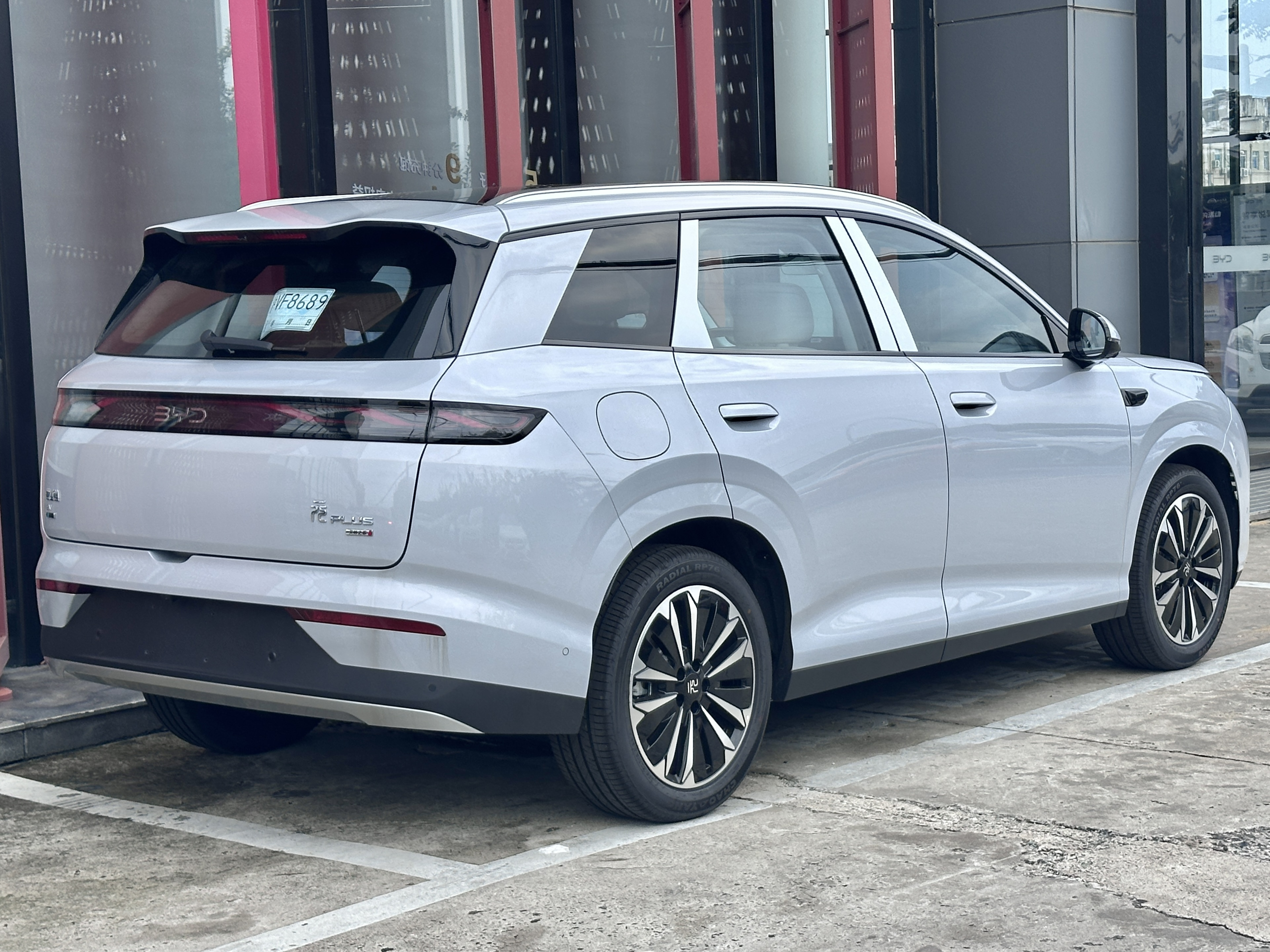
Rear view

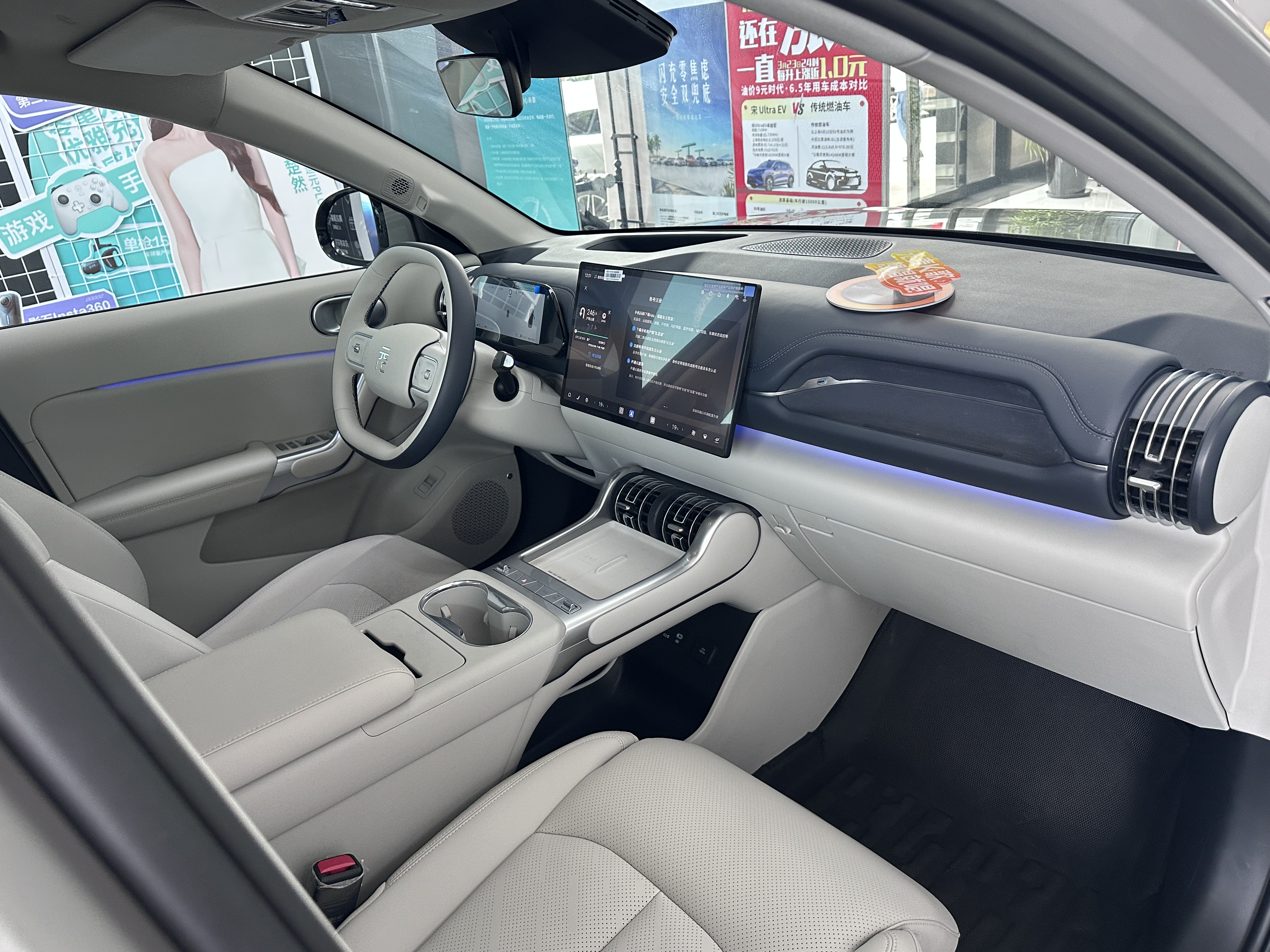
Interior

=== Design ===
The second-generation Yuan Plus adopts BYD's Loong Face (Dragon Face) design language with sharp headlights, a chrome element between them, and semi-hidden door handles. It also has a full-width rear light bar incorporating a woven-pattern lighting element. Compared to the first generation, the second-generation Yuan Plus grew by 210 mm (8.3 in) in length, 50 mm (2.0 in) in width, and the wheelbase was extended by 50 mm (2.0 in), moving the model in a larger segment. In China, the vehicle is offered in nine exterior finishes, including dual-tone versions of Fantasy Pink, Trendy Blue, and Green.

The cabin of the second-generation Yuan Plus uses a newly designed two-spoke steering wheel, a head-up display, a column-mounted gear shifter, and 50-watt wireless phone charging. Additional equipment includes a powered front-passenger "Queen Seat" with leg support, a refrigerated storage compartment, ventilated and heated front seats, a heated steering wheel, and a 16-speaker sound system. Further cabin storage includes a dedicated "figurine storage box" ahead of the front passenger seat, under-seat rear storage drawers, a glasses holder, and an integrated tissue-box compartment.

A powered front frunk with knock-to-open functionality provides 180 L (6 cu ft) of additional storage, while rear cargo volume reaches up to 750 L (26 cu ft).

=== Powertrain ===
The second-generation Yuan Plus switches from the front-wheel-drive layout of its predecessor to a rear-wheel-drive architecture, powered by a rear-mounted electric motor producing either 200 kW (268 hp; 272 PS) or 240 kW (322 hp; 326 PS), compared with 150 kW (201 hp; 204 PS) on the outgoing model. Two second-generation Blade Battery packs are offered, at 57.545 kWh and 68.547 kWh, providing CLTC range ratings of 540 km (336 mi) and 630 km (391 mi) respectively, running on an 800-volt architecture. The model supports BYD's Flash Charging system, capable of a 10 to 70 percent charge in five minutes, or 10 to 97 percent in nine minutes under suitable conditions.

The chassis uses front MacPherson strut and rear five-link independent suspension, along with BYD's DiSus-C intelligent damping body control system, iTAC 2.0 torque control, and TBC tyre-blowout stability control. Higher trims can be optioned with BYD's DiPilot 300 "God's Eye B" advanced driver-assistance system, incorporating lidar and a 30-unit sensor suite supporting highway and urban navigation assistance as well as automated parking.

Battery		Range
Type	Weight	CLTC
57.545 kWh LFP Blade 2.0	399.1 kg (880 lb)	540 km (336 mi)
68.547 kWh LFP Blade 2.0	486.9 kg (1,073 lb)	630 km (391 mi)

=== Export markets ===
The second-generation model is expected to be marketed overseas as the BYD Atto 5, with BYD's New Zealand subsidiary already confirming its nameplate. BYD Auto New Zealand general manager Warren Willmot stated the new model would replace the Atto 3 in the New Zealand range, with the higher numbering chosen specifically to signal the larger size. The model is considered unlikely to be introduced in neighbouring Australia, according to BYD Australia Chief Operating Officer Stephen Collins, who cited concerns that its mid-size SUV positioning would overlap with other SUV models in the local line-up, including the Atto 3 Evo.

== See also ==
- List of BYD Auto vehicles
