= BYD Atto 2 =

Subcompact crossover SUV

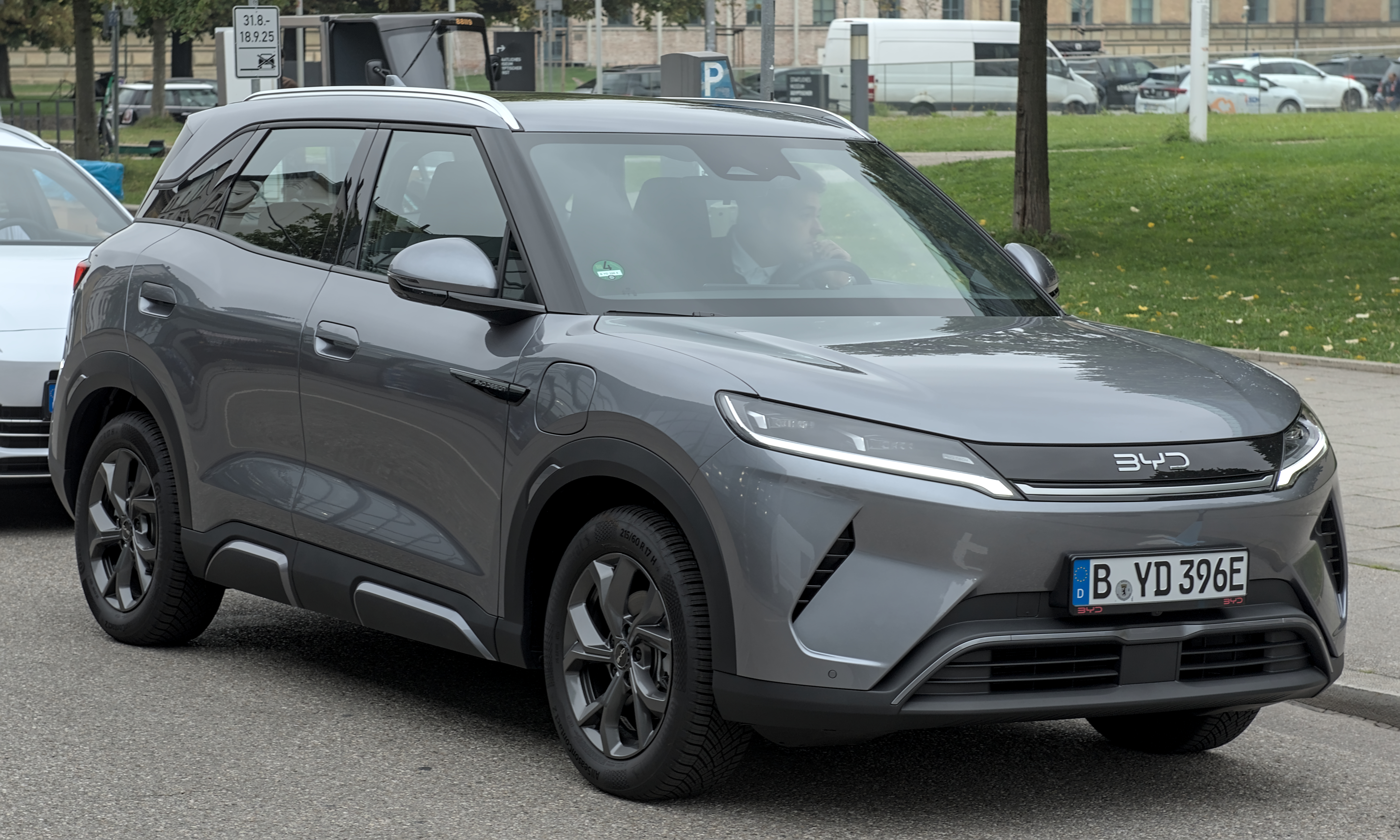
- 2025 BYD Atto 2

Overview
- Manufacturer: BYD Auto
- Model code: SC3E
- Also called: BYD Yuan Up (China, Uzbekistan, Colombia); BYD Yuan Pro (Latin America, except Colombia); BYD S1 Pro (Costa Rica)
- Production: March 2024 – present
- Assembly: China: Changsha, Hunan; Hefei, Anhui; Jinan, Shandong; Indonesia: Subang, West Java (BYD Auto Indonesia, 2027–present)
- Designer: Under the lead of Wolfgang Egger

Body and chassis
- Class: Subcompact SUV (B-segment)
- Body style: 5-door crossover SUV
- Layout: Front-motor, front-wheel-drive (EV); Front-engine, front-motor, front-wheel drive (DM-i)
- Platform: e-Platform 3.0
- Related: BYD Yuan Plus / Atto 3; BYD Dolphin

Powertrain
- Engine: Petrol plug-in hybrid: 1.5 L I4 (DM-i)
- Electric motor: Permanent magnet synchronous
- Power output: 70 kW (94 hp; 95 PS) (EV); 130 kW (174 hp; 177 PS) (EV); 150 kW (201 hp; 204 PS) (EV); 122 kW (164 hp; 166 PS) (DM-i); 156 kW (209 hp; 212 PS) (DM-i)
- Hybrid drivetrain: Plug-in hybrid (DM-i)
- Battery: 7.8 kWh BYD Blade LFP (DM-i); 18 kWh BYD Blade LFP (DM-i); 32 kWh BYD Blade LFP (EV); 45.1 kWh BYD Blade LFP (EV); 51.1 kWh BYD Blade LFP (EV); 64.8 kWh BYD Blade LFP (EV, Europe only)
- Range: 301–401 km (187–249 mi) (EV)

Dimensions
- Wheelbase: 2,620 mm (103.1 in)
- Length: 4,310 mm (169.7 in)
- Width: 1,830 mm (72.0 in)
- Height: 1,675 mm (65.9 in)
- Kerb weight: 1,430–1,540 kg (3,153–3,395 lb)

Chronology
- Predecessor: BYD Yuan Pro

The BYD Atto 2 is a subcompact SUV (B-segment) manufactured by BYD Auto since 2024. First sold in China as a battery electric vehicle called the BYD Yuan Up (Chinese: 比亚迪元UP) and part of the BYD Yuan series that is named after the Yuan dynasty, the Atto 2 was introduced in February 2024 and entered production in March 2024.

In September 2024, the car went on sale in the first export markets, starting with South America under the name BYD Yuan Pro (except in Colombia, where it retains its original name), and with a different local name BYD S1 Pro in Costa Rica. The vehicle is marketed in Europe, Southeast Asia, Australia and New Zealand as the BYD Atto 2.

In October 2025, BYD introduced a plug-in hybrid version of the vehicle, marketed as the BYD Atto 2 DM-i. Not available in China, the model debuted in Europe before expanding to other regions such as Latin America and South Africa.

== Overview ==
The Atto 2 was launched in China on 26 March 2024 in three variants, with the option between 32 and 45.1 kWh battery option sizes. The Yuan Up is based on the e-Platform 3.0 and powered by BYD Blade lithium-ion LFP Battery.

The Atto 2 adopts the Dragon Face design concept that is used on the Song L EV, with a 'dragon face' front fascia, flap-type door handles, a floating roof design, a full-width rear taillight bar, and the rear bumper apron mimics the front bumper design.

The interior has a D-shaped steering wheel with a signature Yuan (元) logo, 8.8-inch LCD instrument cluster, a 12.8-inch infotainment touchscreen display which can rotate between landscape and portrait modes, perforated leatherette upholstery for the seats, a wireless charging pad, a crystal gear selector and physical buttons in the centre console.

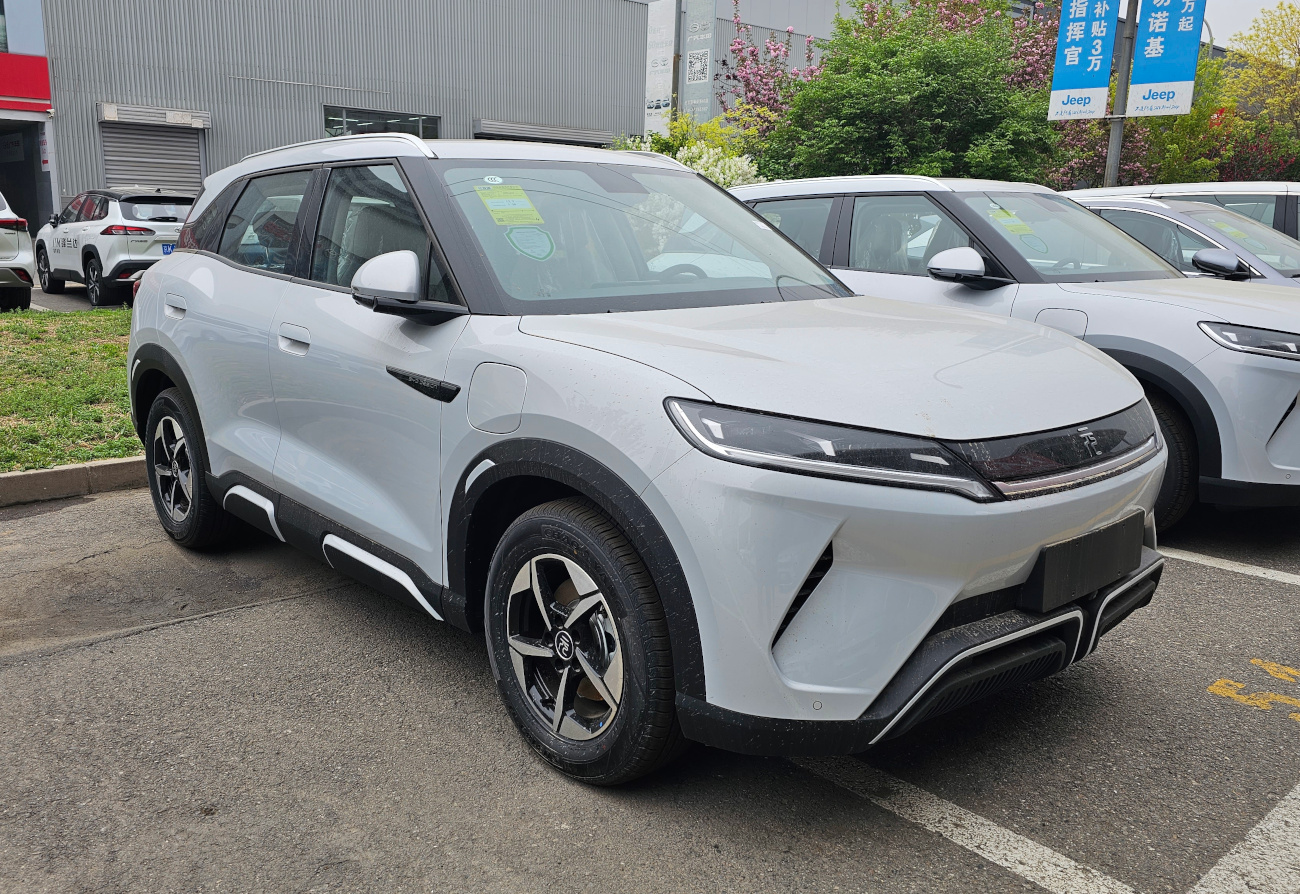
BYD Yuan Up

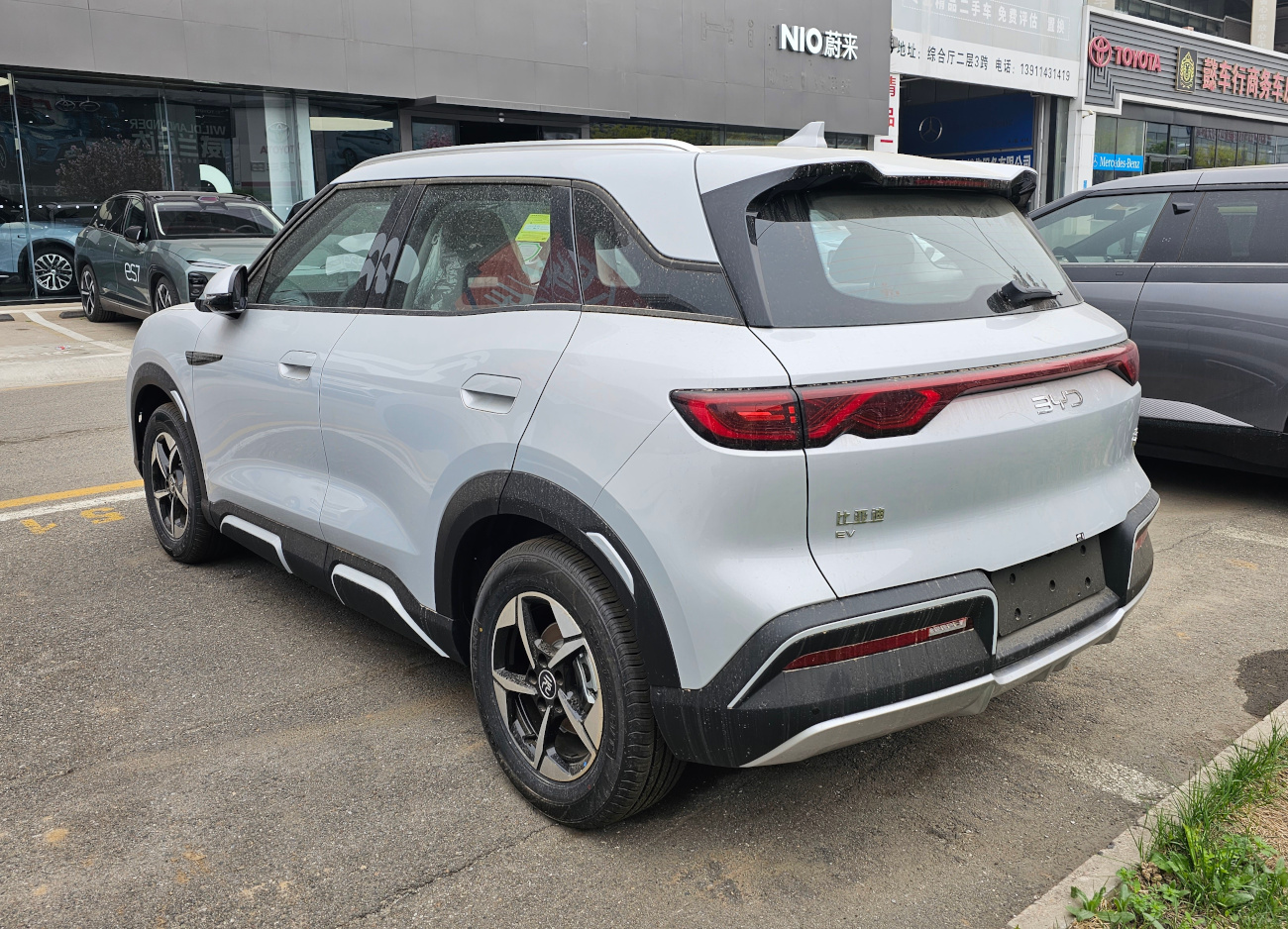
Rear view

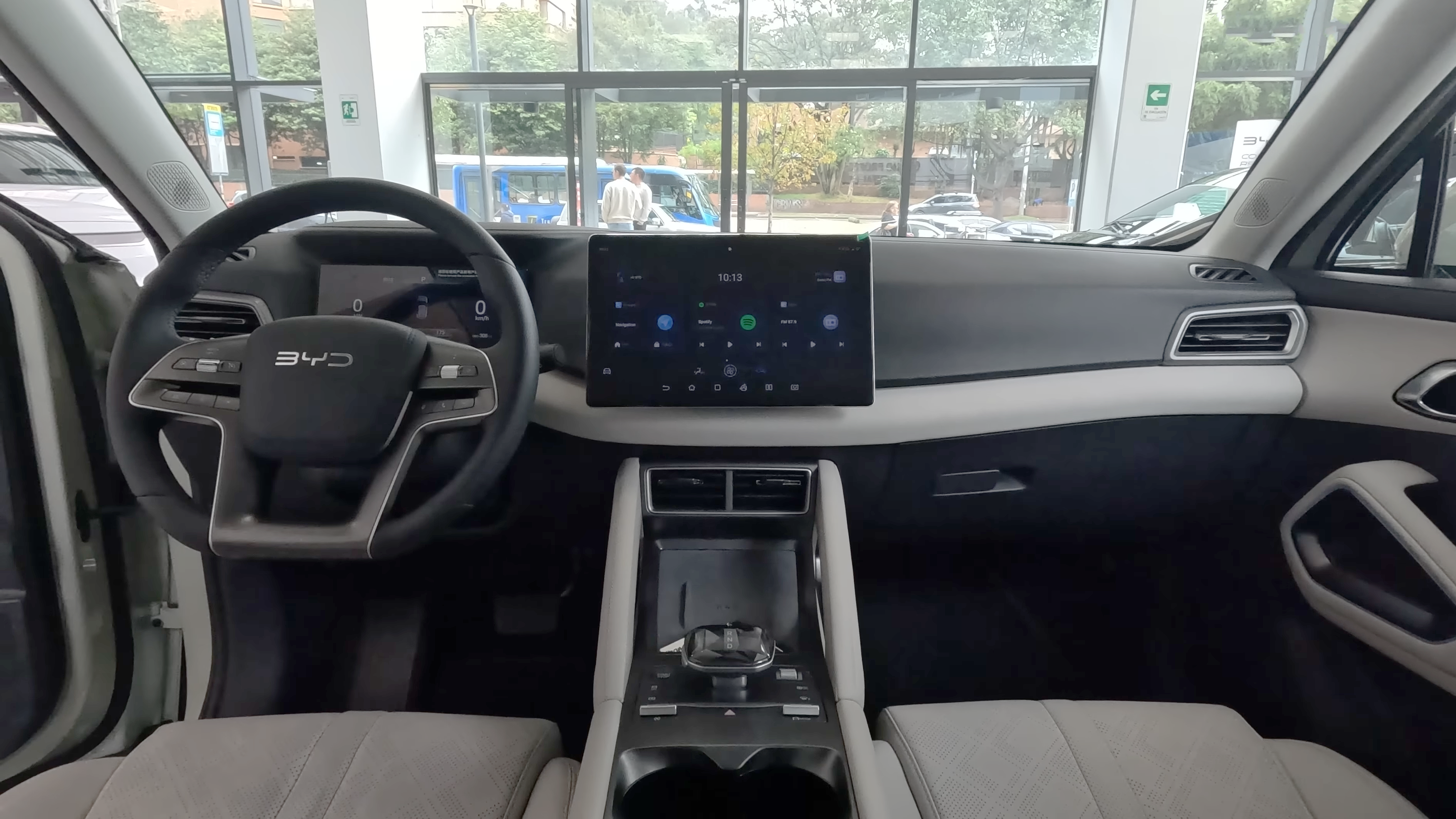
Interior

== Markets ==
=== Africa ===
==== South Africa ====
The vehicle is marketed in South Africa as the Atto 2 and launched on 11 June 2026. It is available as the DM-i model, with two variants: Comfort and Dynamic, both using the 7.8 kWh battery pack. At the time of its introduction, the Atto 2 DM-i was the cheapest plug-in hybrid electric vehicle (PHEV) on sale in South Africa.

In September 2026, the EV model was introduced in South Africa using the 51.1 kWh battery pack for the Dynamic variant.

=== Asia ===
==== Brunei ====
The vehicle is marketed in Brunei as the Atto 2 and launched on 29 July 2026 in a sole DM-i variant.

==== Malaysia ====
The vehicle is marketed in Malaysia as the Atto 2 and was launched on 24 July 2025 in a sole variant using the 51.1 kWh battery pack. The Malaysian-spec model uses a column-mounted gear selector from the Hong Kong-market right-hand-drive model and features a single row of physical buttons in the centre console.

==== Pakistan ====
The vehicle is marketed in Pakistan as the Atto 2 and was launched on 24 January 2026 in a sole EV variant using the 45.1 kWh battery pack and the 130 kW electric motor. The Pakistan-spec model uses a column-mounted gear selector and features a single row of physical buttons in the centre console.

==== Philippines ====
The vehicle is marketed in the Philippines as the Atto 2 and was launched on 28 July 2026 in both DM-i and EV versions. The Atto 2 DM-i is available in two variants, Dynamic and Premium using the 7.9 kWh battery pack, while the Atto 2 EV is available in a sole Premium variant using the 45.1 kWh battery pack.

==== Singapore ====
The vehicle is marketed in Singapore as the Atto 2 and was launched on 6 August 2025 in a sole variant using the 51.1 kWh battery pack.

==== Thailand ====
The vehicle is marketed in Thailand as the Atto 2 and was launched on 23 March 2026. It is available in two variants: Dynamic and Premium, both using the 51.1 kWh battery pack.

==== Vietnam ====
The vehicle is marketed in Vietnam as the Atto 2 and was launched on 4 July 2025 in a sole variant using the 45.1 kWh battery pack.

=== Europe ===
The Atto 2 was introduced to the European public at the 2025 Brussels Motor Show in January 2025 and went on sale across the continent in February 2025. At launch, it was available in two trim levels, Active and Boost, both using the 45.1 kWh battery and rated at 312 km (194 mi) of WLTP range. A larger battery variant marketed as Comfort was confirmed to follow later in 2025.

In October 2025, BYD announced a plug-in hybrid model for Europe, the Atto 2 DM-i, making its European debut at the Fleet Europe Days event in Luxembourg. It is formally launched on 20 November 2025. The Atto 2 DM-i is available in two variants, Active and Boost. The Active variant uses a 7.8 kWh battery, offering a claimed range of 40 km (25 mi), while the Boost variant uses an 18 kWh battery with a claimed range of 90 km (56 mi). Compared to the battery electric model, the DM-i is 20 mm (0.8 in) longer at 4,330 mm (170.5 in), and features a larger front grille, revised lower bumper, the removal of the side vents in the front wings, revised tailgate badging, and an "Midnight Blue" exterior colour option.

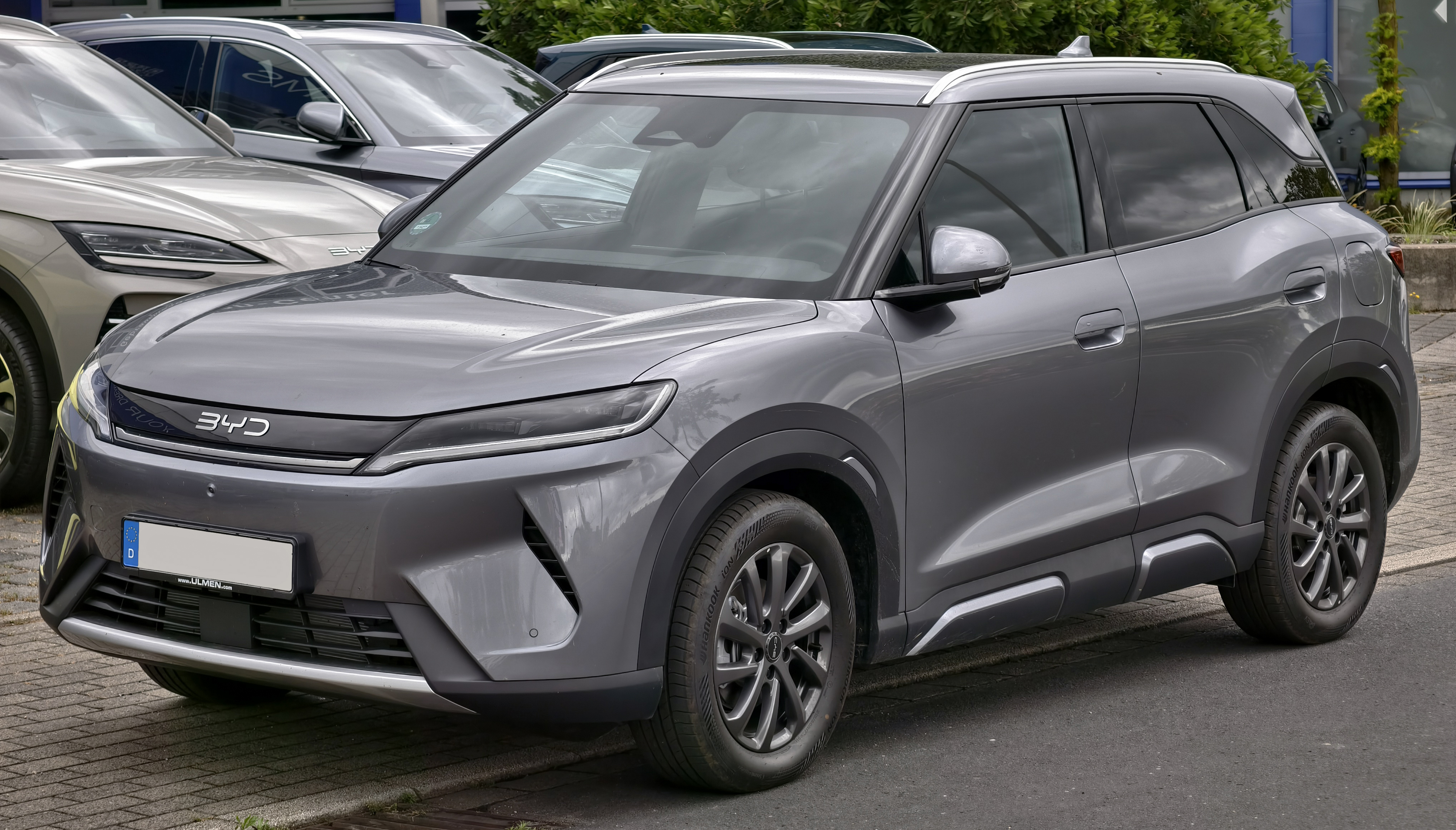
BYD Atto 2 DM-i

Rear view

==== United Kingdom ====
The vehicle is marketed in the United Kingdom as the Atto 2. Pricing and specification were confirmed on 20 August 2025, with customer deliveries of the entry-level Boost variant beginning in September 2025 and the Comfort variant following later in the year. It is available in two trim levels: Boost, using the 51.1 kWh battery, and Comfort, using the 64.8 kWh battery. The Comfort trim also supports a higher maximum DC charging rate of 155 kW, compared to 82 kW on the Boost.

The Atto 2 DM-i was made available to order in the United Kingdom from June 2026, with first deliveries from August 2026. It is available in Active and Boost variants. The Active uses a 7.8 kWh battery, while the Boost uses an 18 kWh battery.

=== Latin America ===
==== Argentina ====
The vehicle is marketed in Argentina as the Yuan Pro EV and was launched on 8 October 2025 as part of BYD's entry to the Argentinian market. It is available in two variants: GL and GS, equipped with a 45.1 kWh battery.

The plug-in hybrid version, marketed as the Atto 2 DM-i, was launched on 20 February 2026. It is available in the sole unnamed variant using the 18 kWh battery pack.

==== Brazil ====
The vehicle is marketed in Brazil as the Yuan Pro EV and went on sale on 5 September 2024 in a sole variant equipped with a 45.1 kWh battery. The plug-in hybrid version, marketed as the Atto 2 DM-i Flex, went on sale on 9 June 2026. It is the first ethanol flex-fuel plug-in hybrid model from BYD. The Atto 2 DM-i Flex is available in two variants, GL and GS, using 7.85 kWh and 18.03 kWh batteries respectively.

==== Colombia ====
The vehicle is marketed in Colombia as the BYD Yuan Up and went on sale on 30 July 2024 in a sole variant equipped with a 45.1 kWh battery.

==== Mexico ====
The vehicle is marketed in Mexico as the BYD Yuan Pro and went on sale on 6 November 2024 in a sole variant equipped with a 45.1 kWh battery.

The plug-in hybrid model, the DM-i, was introduced in Mexico on 8 April 2026 in the sole variant using the 7.85 kWh battery.

=== Oceania ===
==== Australia ====
The vehicle is marketed in Australia as the Atto 2 and went on sale on 13 November 2025. It is available in two variants, Dynamic and Premium, both using the 51.3 kWh battery pack. At the time of its introduction, the Atto 2 was the cheapest battery electric crossover SUV on sale in Australia.

The plug-in hybrid version, the DM-i, was introduced to Australia on 24 September 2026 for the Essential and Premium trims.

== Powertrain ==
Type	Battery	Layout	Electric motor	Power	Torque	0–100 km/h (0–62 mph) (claimed)	Range (claimed)			Calendar years
Type	Battery	Layout	Electric motor	Power	Torque	0–100 km/h (0–62 mph) (claimed)	CLTC	NEDC	WLTP	Calendar years
301 km	32 kWh LFP blade battery	FWD	TZ180XSF PMSM	70 kW (94 hp; 95 PS)	180 N⋅m (18.4 kg⋅m; 133 lb⋅ft)	12 seconds	301 km (187 mi)	N/A	N/A	2024–present
401 km	45.12 kWh LFP blade battery	FWD	TZ200XSW PMSM	70 kW (94 hp; 95 PS)	180 N⋅m (18.4 kg⋅m; 133 lb⋅ft)	12.9 seconds	401 km (249 mi)	N/A	N/A	2024–present
401 km	45.12 kWh LFP blade battery	FWD	TZ200XSW PMSM	130 kW (174 hp; 177 PS)	290 N⋅m (29.6 kg⋅m; 214 lb⋅ft)	7.9 seconds	401 km (249 mi)	380 km (236 mi)	312 km (194 mi)	2024–present
Standard Range (export)	51.1 kWh LFP blade battery	FWD	TZ200XSW PMSM	130 kW (174 hp; 177 PS)	290 N⋅m (29.6 kg⋅m; 214 lb⋅ft)	7.9 seconds	N/A	410 km (255 mi)	344 km (214 mi)	2024–present
Long Range (export)	64 kWh LFP blade battery	FWD	TZ200XSW PMSM	150 kW (201 hp; 204 PS)	310 N⋅m (31.6 kg⋅m; 229 lb⋅ft)	7.9 seconds	N/A	495 km (308 mi)	430 km (267 mi)	2024–present

== See also ==
- List of BYD Auto vehicles
