= BYD Yuan =

Subcompact crossover SUV

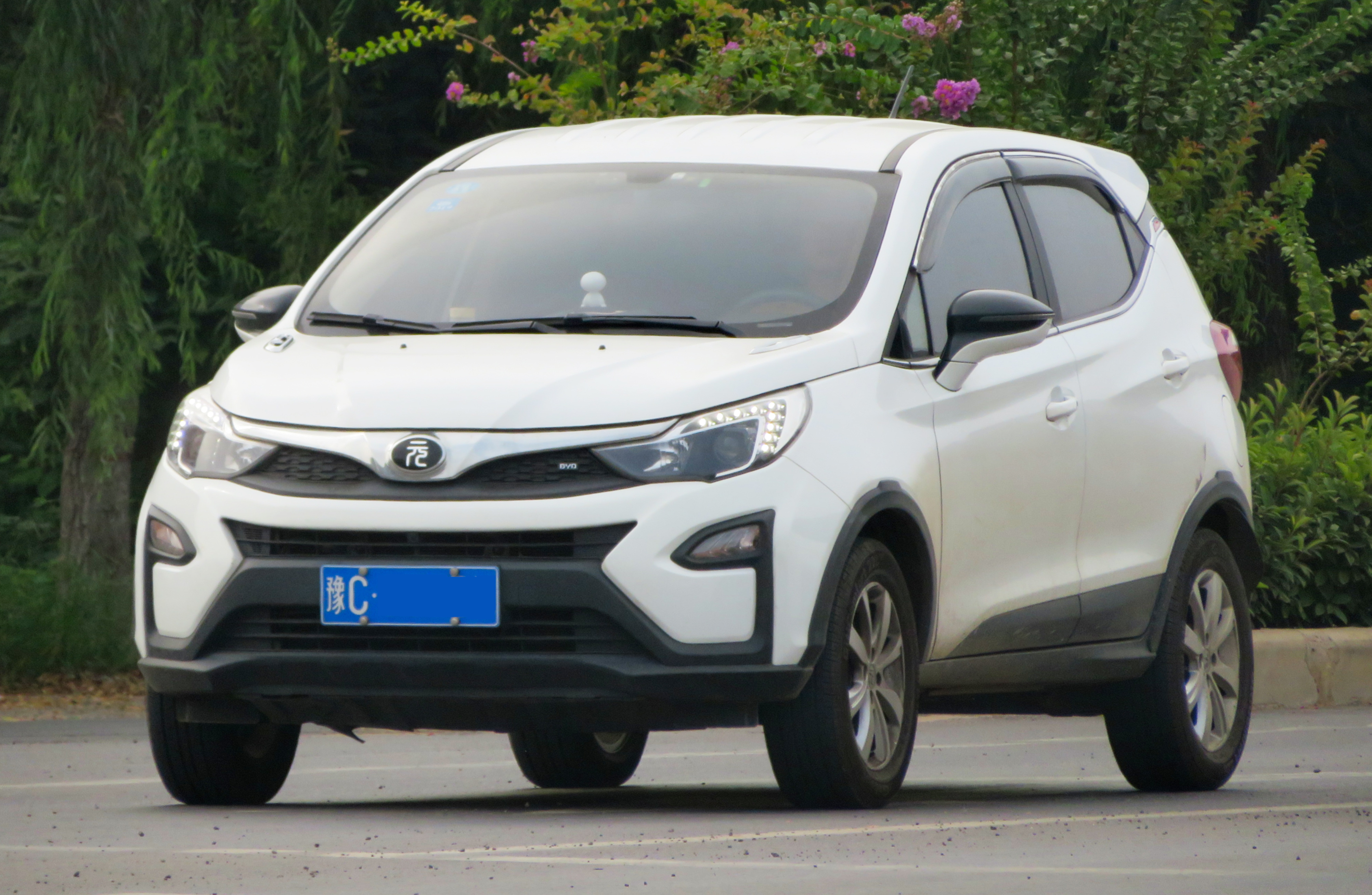
- BYD Yuan Sport

Overview
- Manufacturer: BYD Auto
- Production: 2016–present

Body and chassis
- Class: Subcompact SUV
- Body style: 5-door crossover SUV
- Layout: Front-engine, front-wheel-drive

Chronology
- Predecessor: BYD S1
- Successor: BYD Yuan Up/Pro / Atto 2 / S1 Pro; BYD Yuan Plus / Atto 3

The BYD Yuan (Chinese: 比亚迪元) is a subcompact SUV produced by Chinese electric vehicle manufacturer BYD Auto, slotting below the BYD Song compact crossover. It is part of BYD's "Dynasty Series" of production vehicles, and is named after the Yuan dynasty.

Released since March 2016, the BYD Yuan is currently available only as an all-electric vehicle, although previously a gasoline and a plug-in hybrid version were also offered. The gasoline version of BYD Yuan was sold since 2015 as the BYD S1 before being renamed and becoming part of the Yuan family. In some markets the S1 name was kept, and reused even for the all-electric version. The BYD S2 is an all-electric subcompact crossover that is essentially a rebadged Yuan, shorter than the original Yuan and the S1, and was launched in 2019.

The battery electric Yuan Plus variant was revealed in July 2021. It is marketed as the BYD Yuan Plus (or BYD Atto 3 in many markets). Compared to the first generation, it is classified as a compact crossover and features slightly larger dimensions, a more upmarket design, and BYD's proprietary blade battery. In March 2024, the second generation Yuan called the Yuan Up was launched, slotting under the Yuan Plus and continue to serve as BYD's subcompact crossover offering.

== Yuan / Yuan Pro (2015) ==
BYD Yuan / Yuan Pro
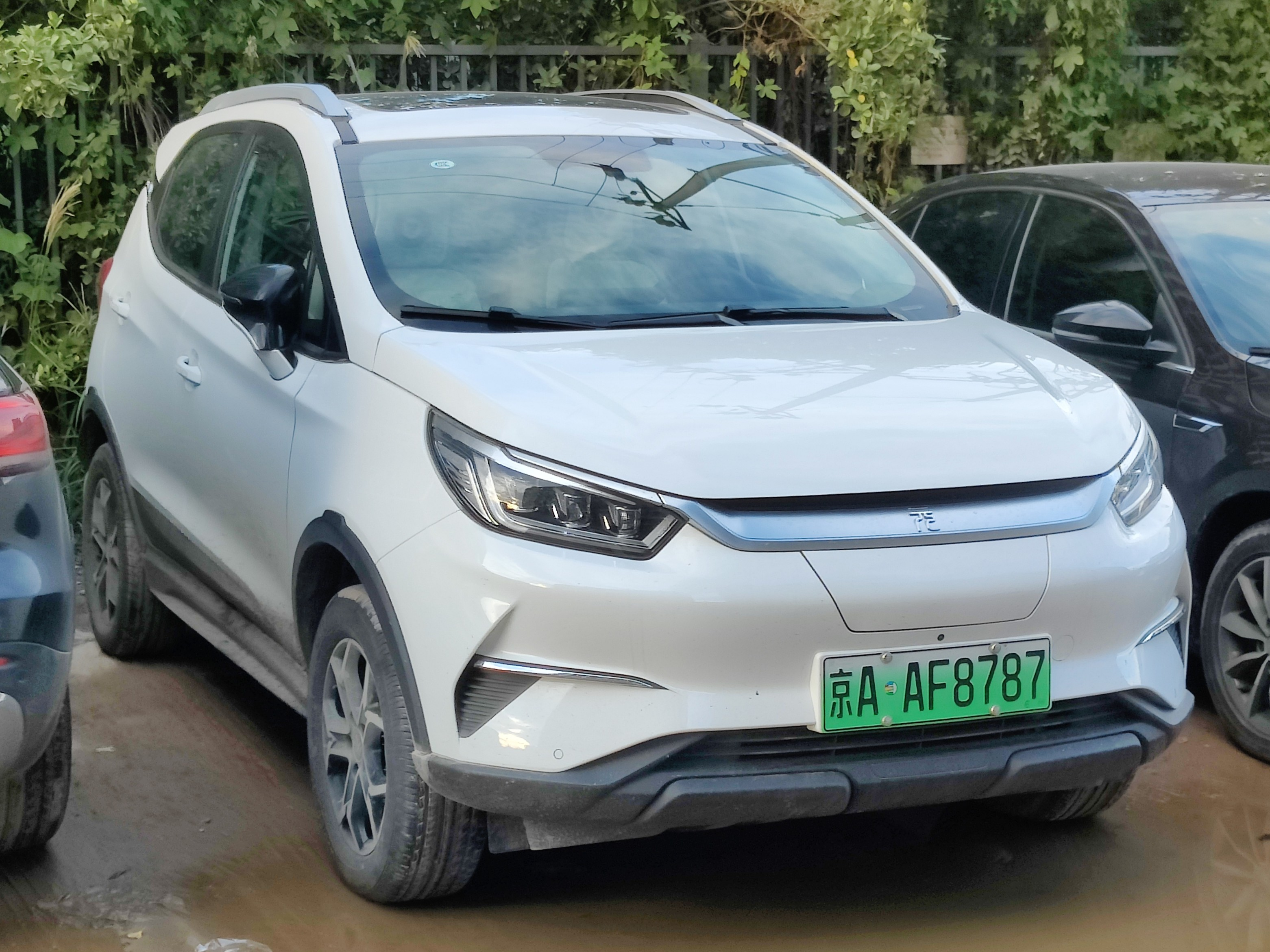

Overview
- Also called: BYD S1
- Production: 2015–2021 (Yuan); 2021–2024 (Yuan Pro); 2019–2022 (BYD S2)

Body and chassis
- Related: BYD S2

Powertrain
- Engine: 1.5 L BYD473QE I4 1.5 L BYD476ZQA I4 turbo
- Electric motor: Permanent magnet synchronous motor 70 kW or 120 kW
- Transmission: 5-speed manual 6-speed DCT; CVT
- Battery: 53.22 kWh; 40.62 kWh; 42 kWh

Dimensions
- Wheelbase: 2,520 mm (99.2 in)
- Length: 4,320 mm (170.1 in)
- Width: 1,765 mm (69.5 in)
- Height: 1,630 mm (64.2 in)

The BYD Yuan is the fourth BYD product and the third BYD crossover using the Chinese dynasty naming system, following the BYD Song compact crossover, the BYD Tang mid-size crossover and the BYD Qin compact sedan. Just like they did with the BYD Song, BYD has decided to use the same name (Yuan) for the entire powertrain range, including a gasoline version, a hybrid version and an electric version (previously the gasoline version was known as the S1, while the hybrid and electric versions used the Yuan nameplate from the beginning).

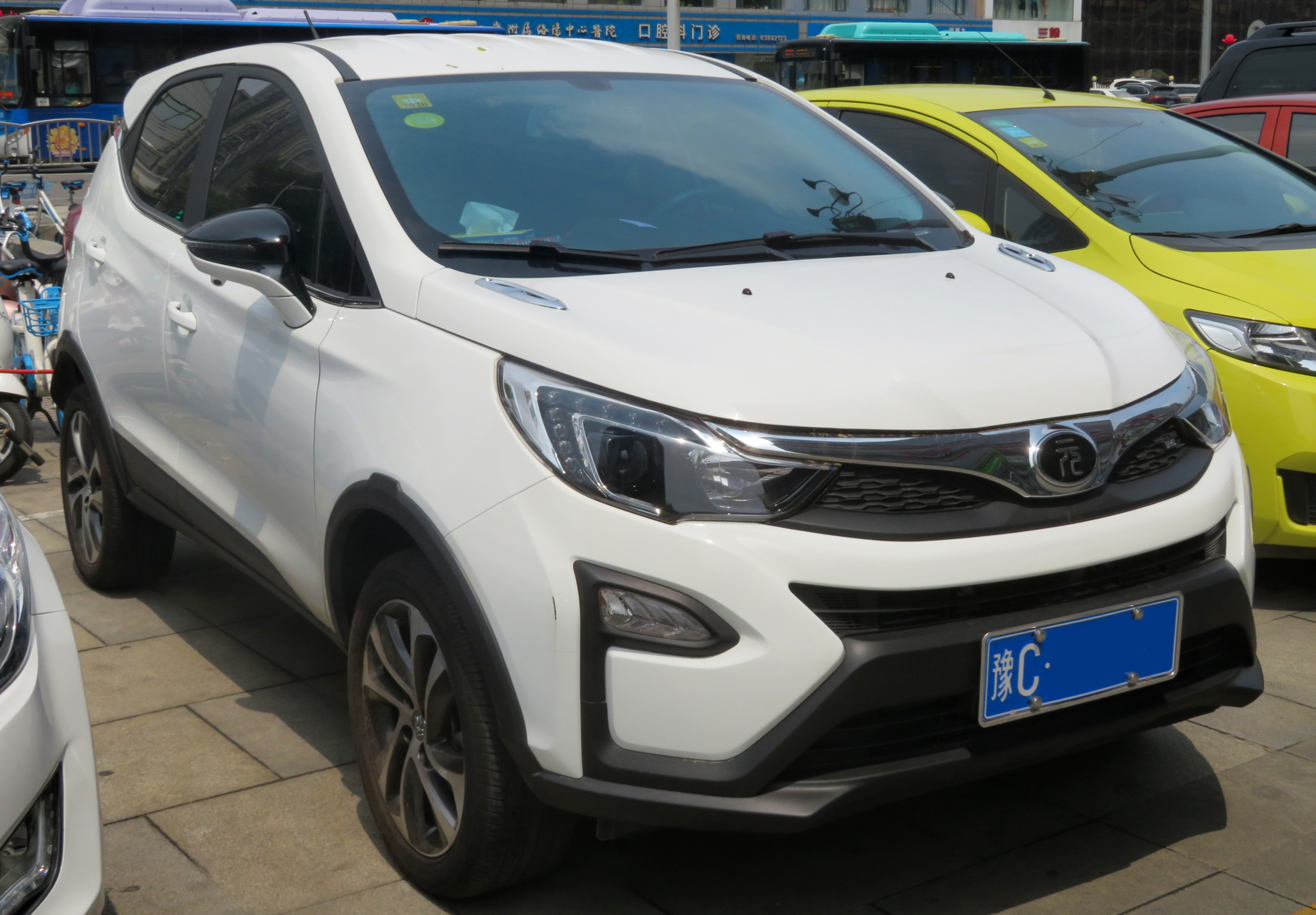
BYD Yuan (pre-facelift; front)

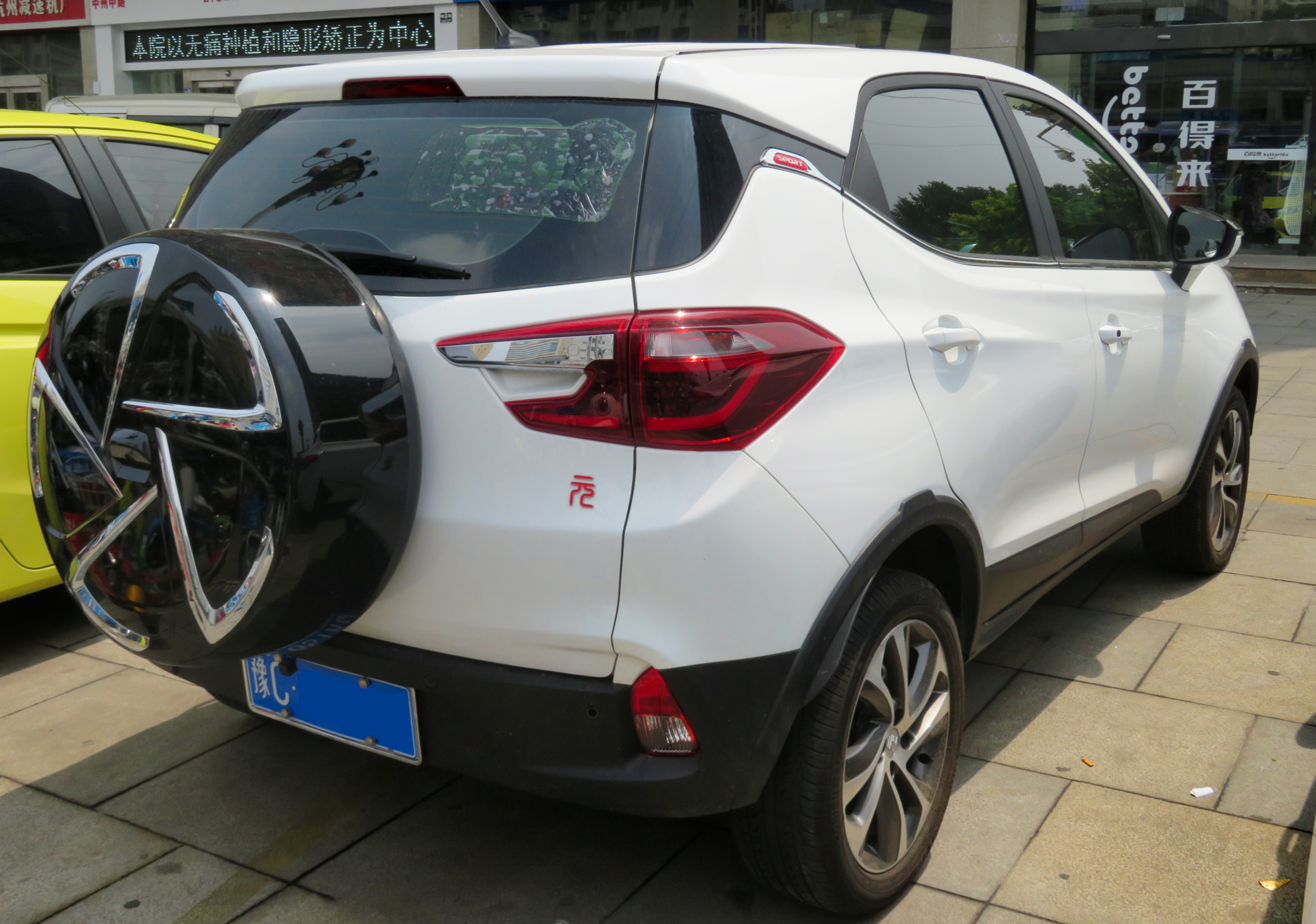
BYD Yuan (pre-facelift; rear)

=== BYD S1 ===
The BYD S1 is a gasoline-powered subcompact crossover launched by BYD in 2015. Besides the Chinese market, it was also offered in the Philippines. In the Chinese market, with the introduction of the Yuan nameplate in 2016, the S1 was renamed and was since sold as the gasoline version of the Yuan.

In some non-Chinese markets, the old S1 name was kept, despite the renaming of the vehicle in China. Even the all-electric variant of the Yuan was known in some markets as the S1 EV.

=== BYD Yuan facelift and Yuan EV ===
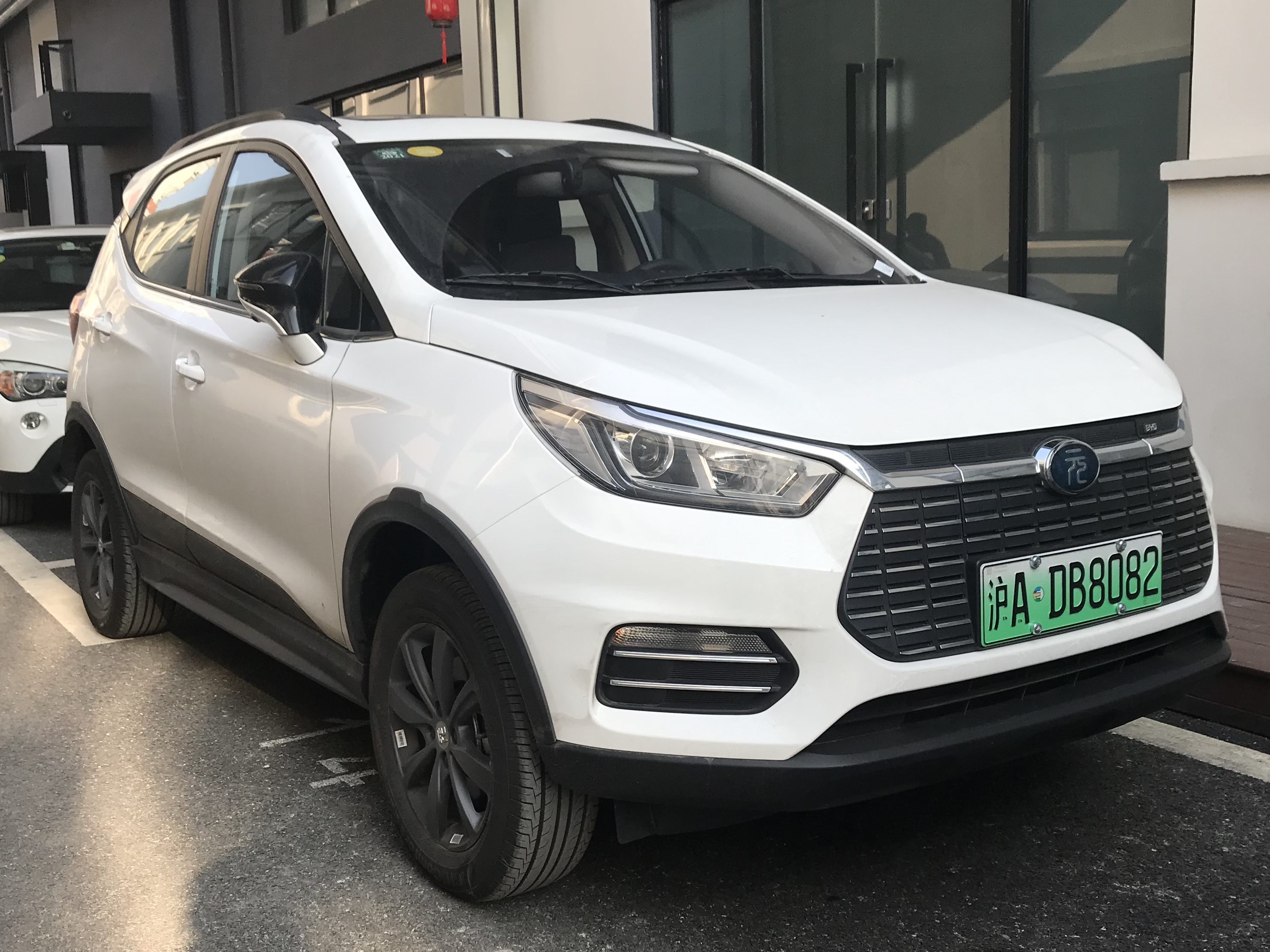
BYD Yuan facelift (EV)

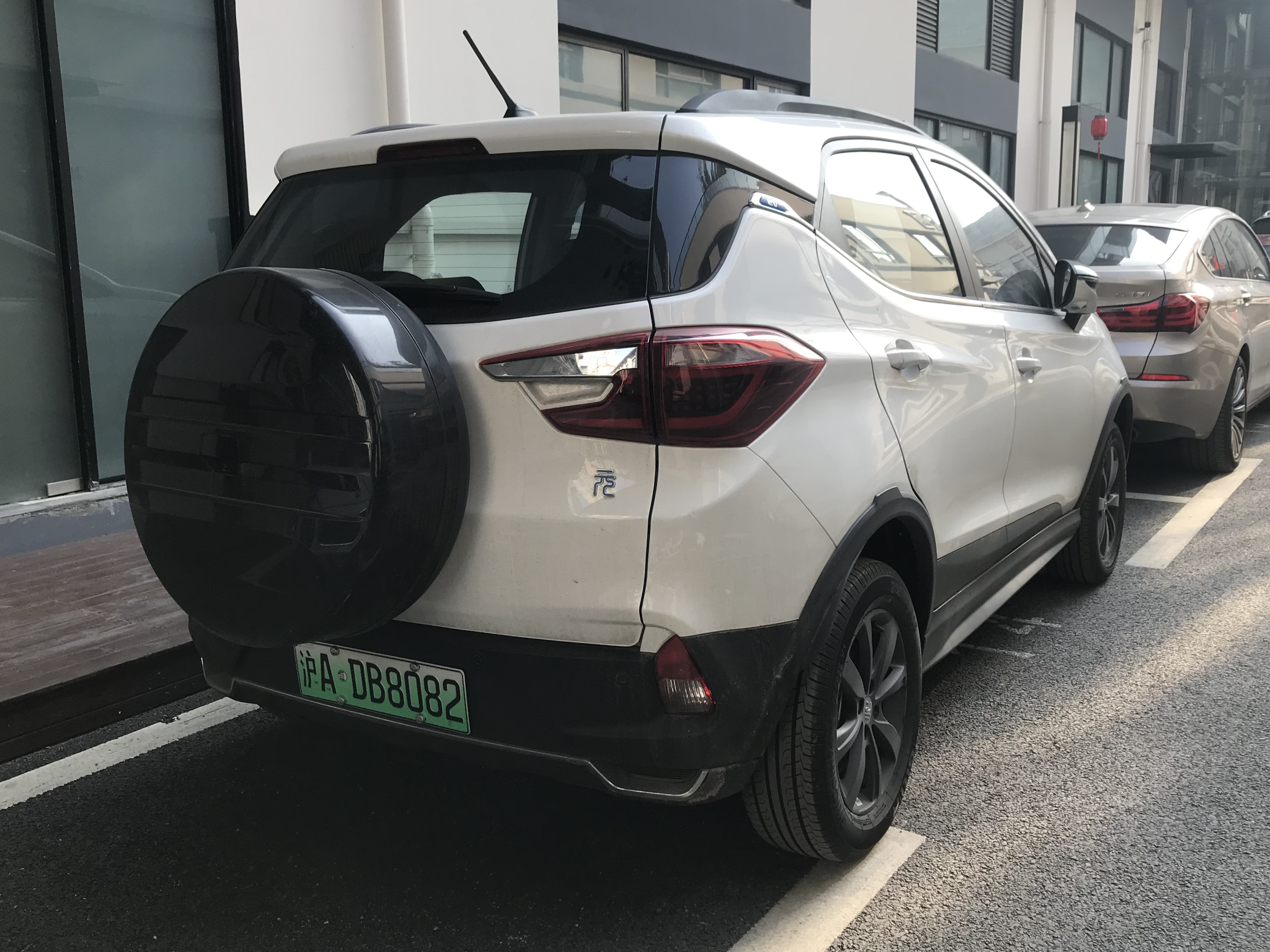
BYD Yuan facelift (EV)

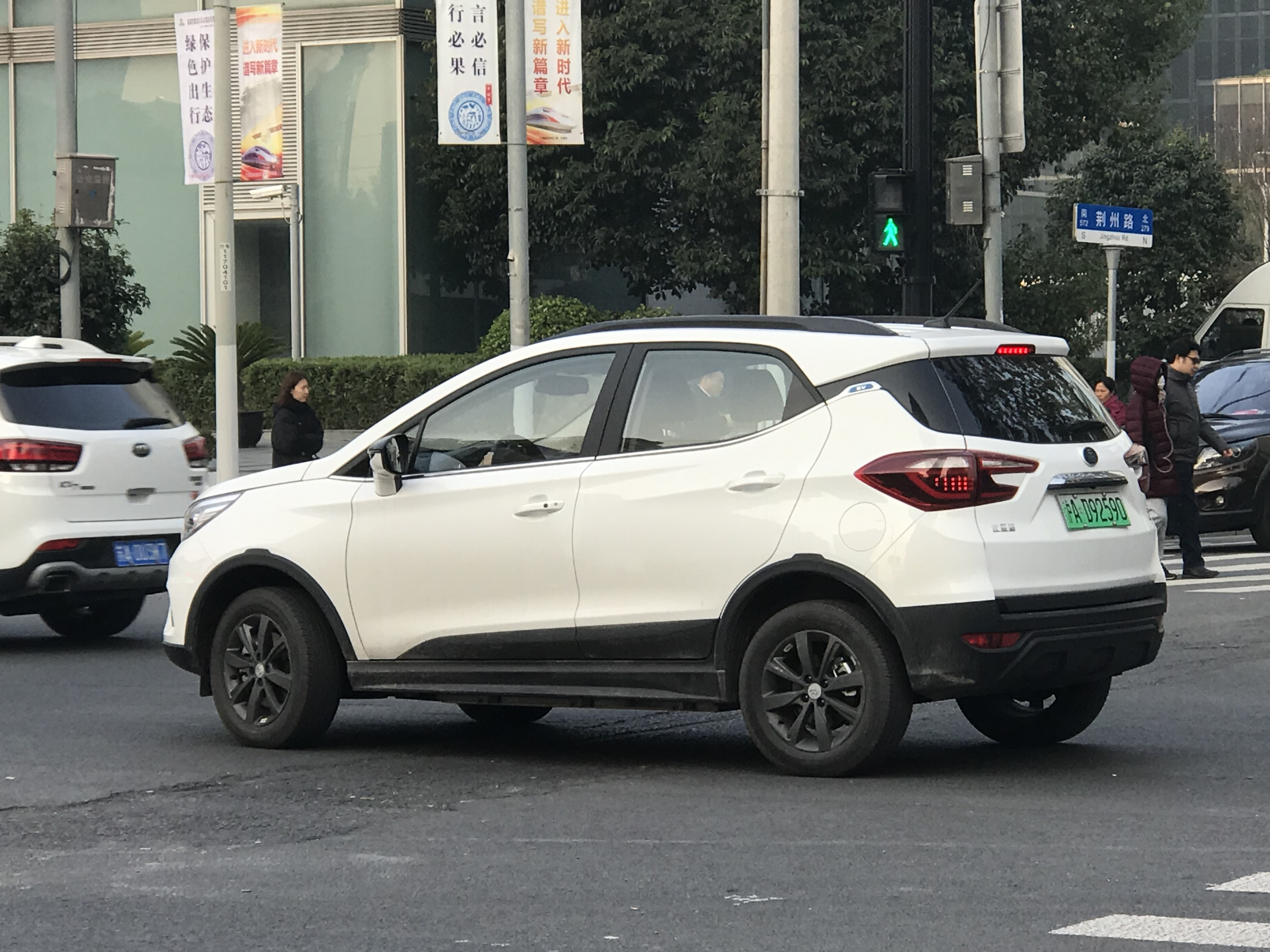
BYD Yuan facelift (EV; without spare tire)

In 2018, the BYD Yuan was facelifted, with the new "Dragon Face" styling of the front end, in line with all the other "dynasty" series products. The all-electric Yuan EV360 was also launched with prices ranging from 79,900 yuan to 99,900 yuan. The BYD Yuan EV360 has a 43.2kWh battery with a maximum range of 305 kilometres (190 mi). There is also the BYD Yuan EV535 with a larger, 53.2 kWh battery.

=== BYD S2 ===
The BYD S2 is an all-electric subcompact crossover sold in China since 2019. The battery capacity is 40.62 kWh.

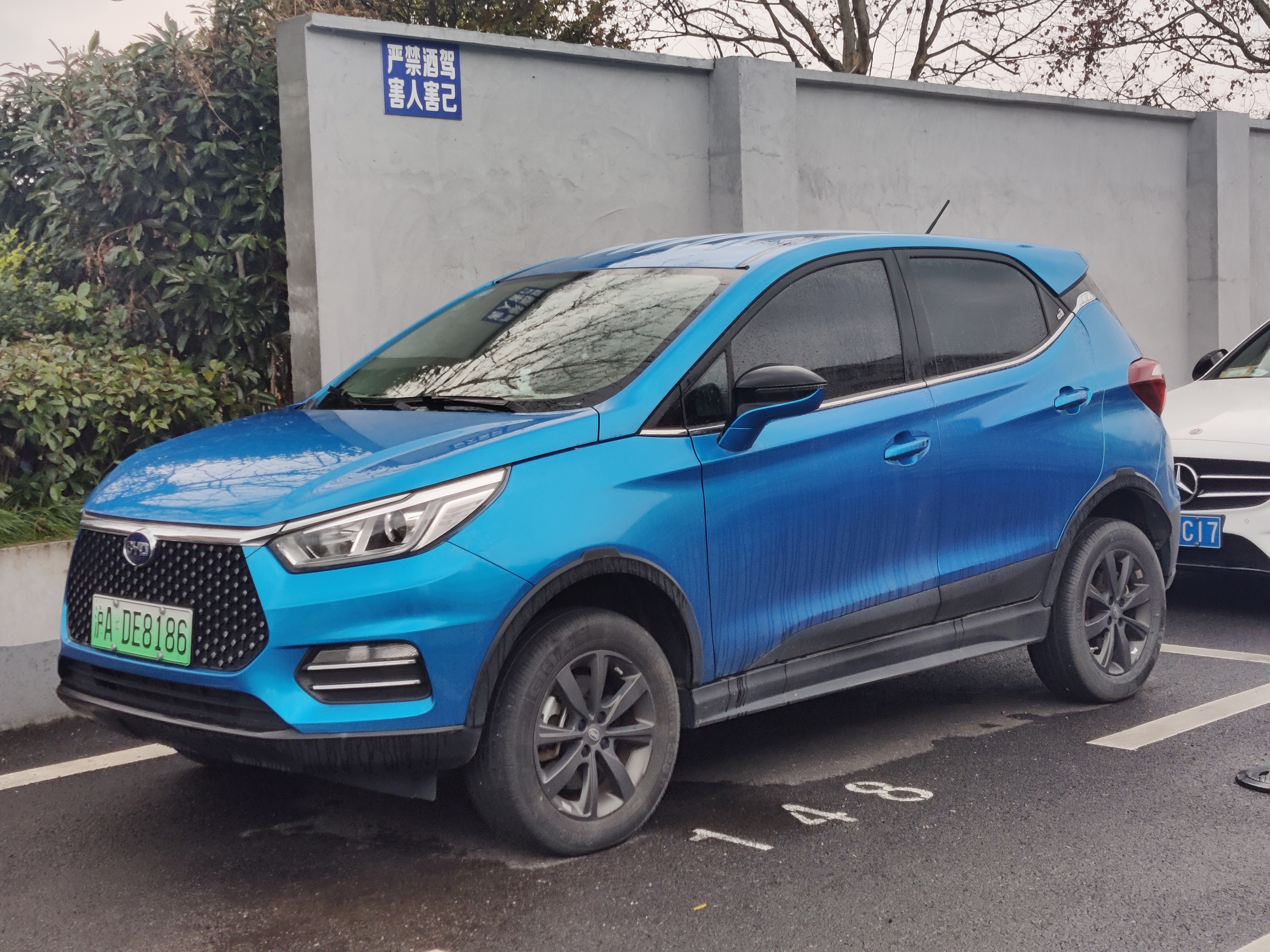
BYD S2 (front)

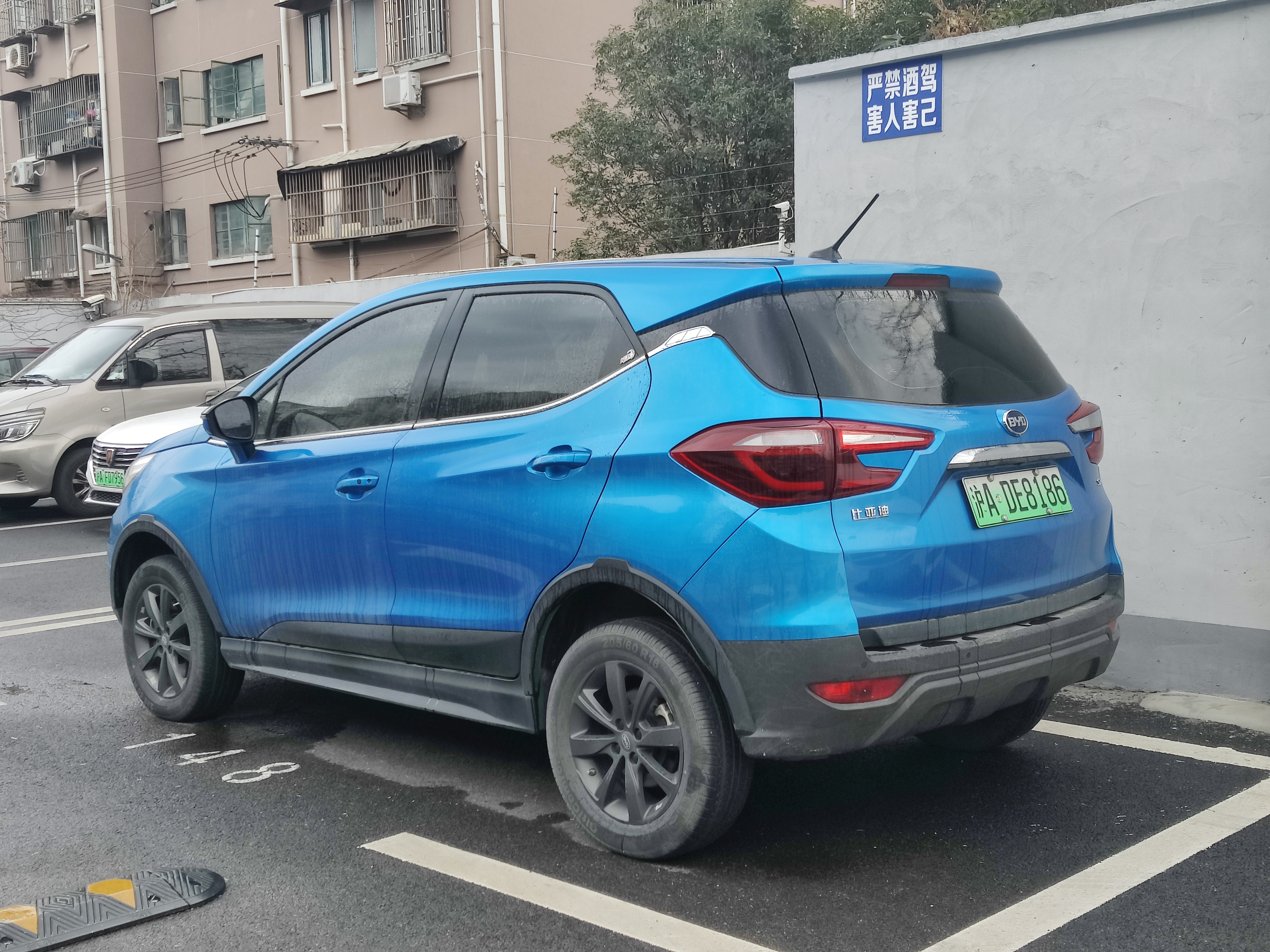
BYD S2 (rear)

=== 2020 Yuan EV ===
As of August 2020, the only variants of the Yuan advertised by BYD in China are all-electric. Alongside the 2019 BYD Yuan EV360 (42 kWh battery), the 2020 BYD Yuan EV is offered, with two battery options: 40.62 kWh and 53.22 kWh. According to the NEDC norm, the range with the larger battery is 410 km (250 mi).

=== Yuan Pro (2021 facelift) ===
The Yuan EV received a facelift for the 2021 model year called the Yuan Pro. The Yuan Pro features a redesigned front fascia in the same style as the BYD Han EV. In terms of performance, the Yuan Pro is available with a single motor producing 136 hp (101 kW; 138 PS) and a torque of 210 N⋅m (155 lb⋅ft). The Yuan Pro is equipped with a 50.1-kWh lithium iron phosphate "blade battery" developed by BYD that is capable of a NEDC range of 401 km (249 mi).

The interior is largely carried over from the pre-facelift model with the 10.1-inch multimedia screen, and is integrated with the DiLink3.0 intelligent connected system featuring voice command, voice notifications, Bluetooth phone calls, phone connectivity and mobile onboard television.

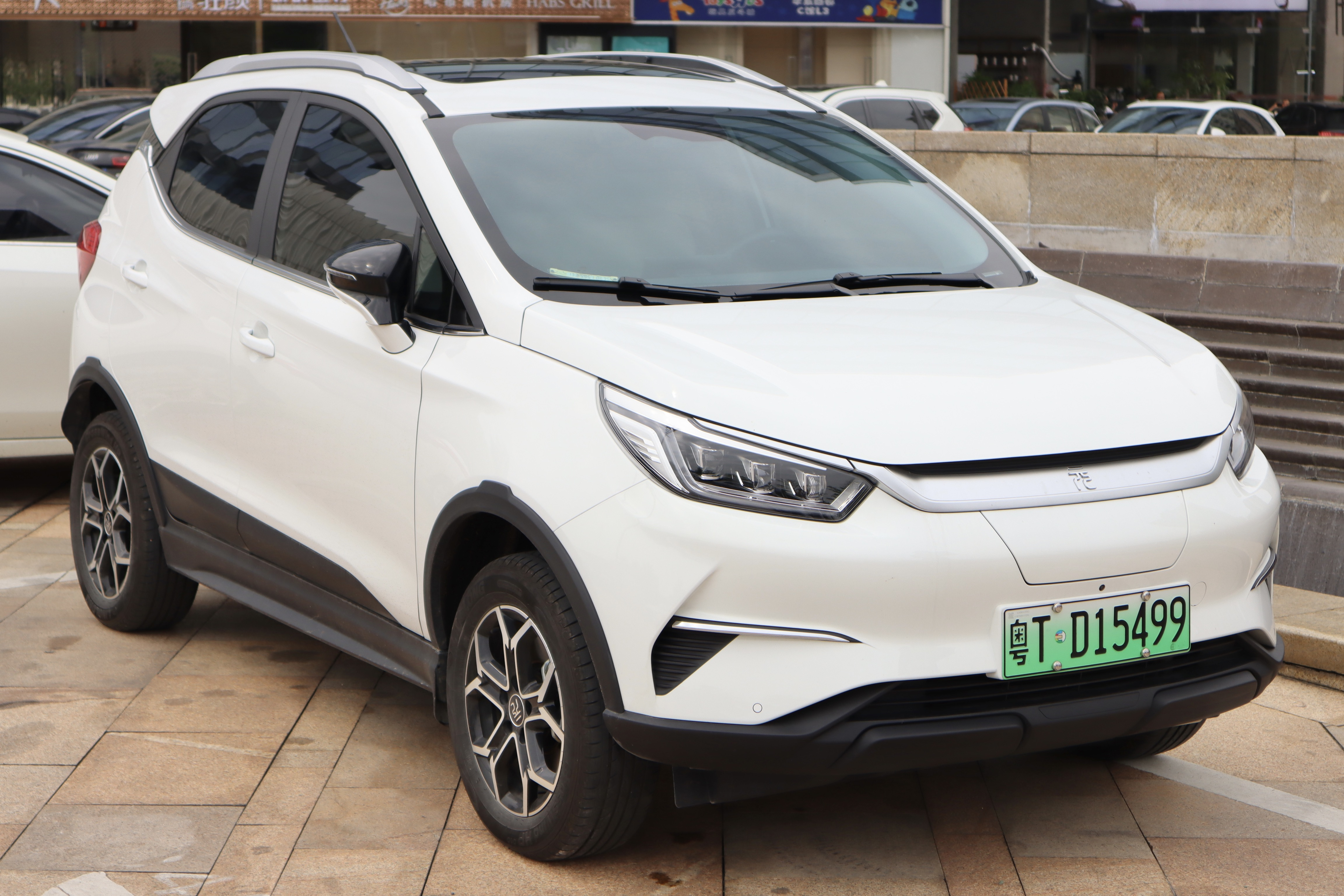
BYD Yuan Pro (EV)

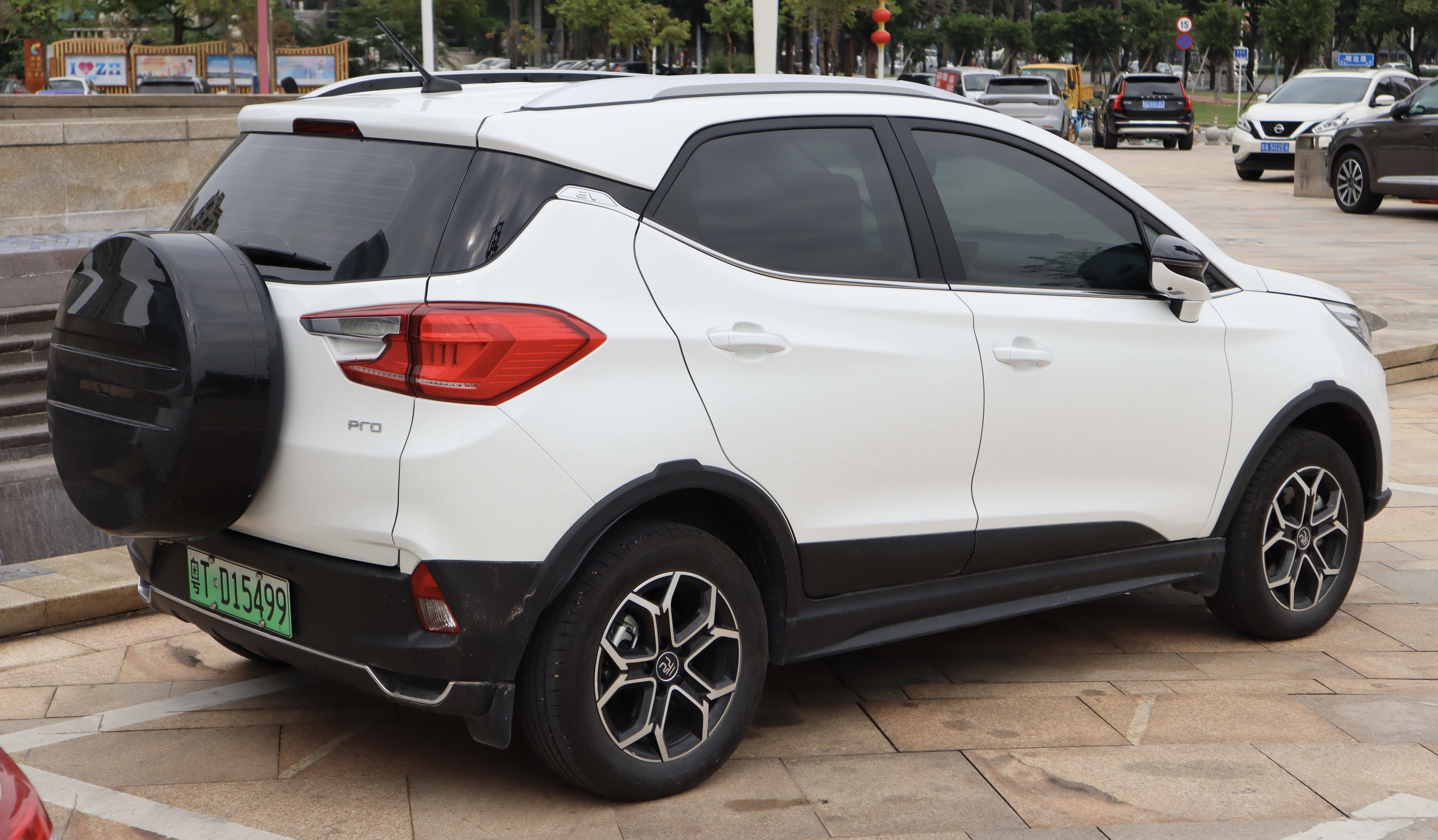
BYD Yuan Pro rear (EV)

== Yuan Plus (2022) ==
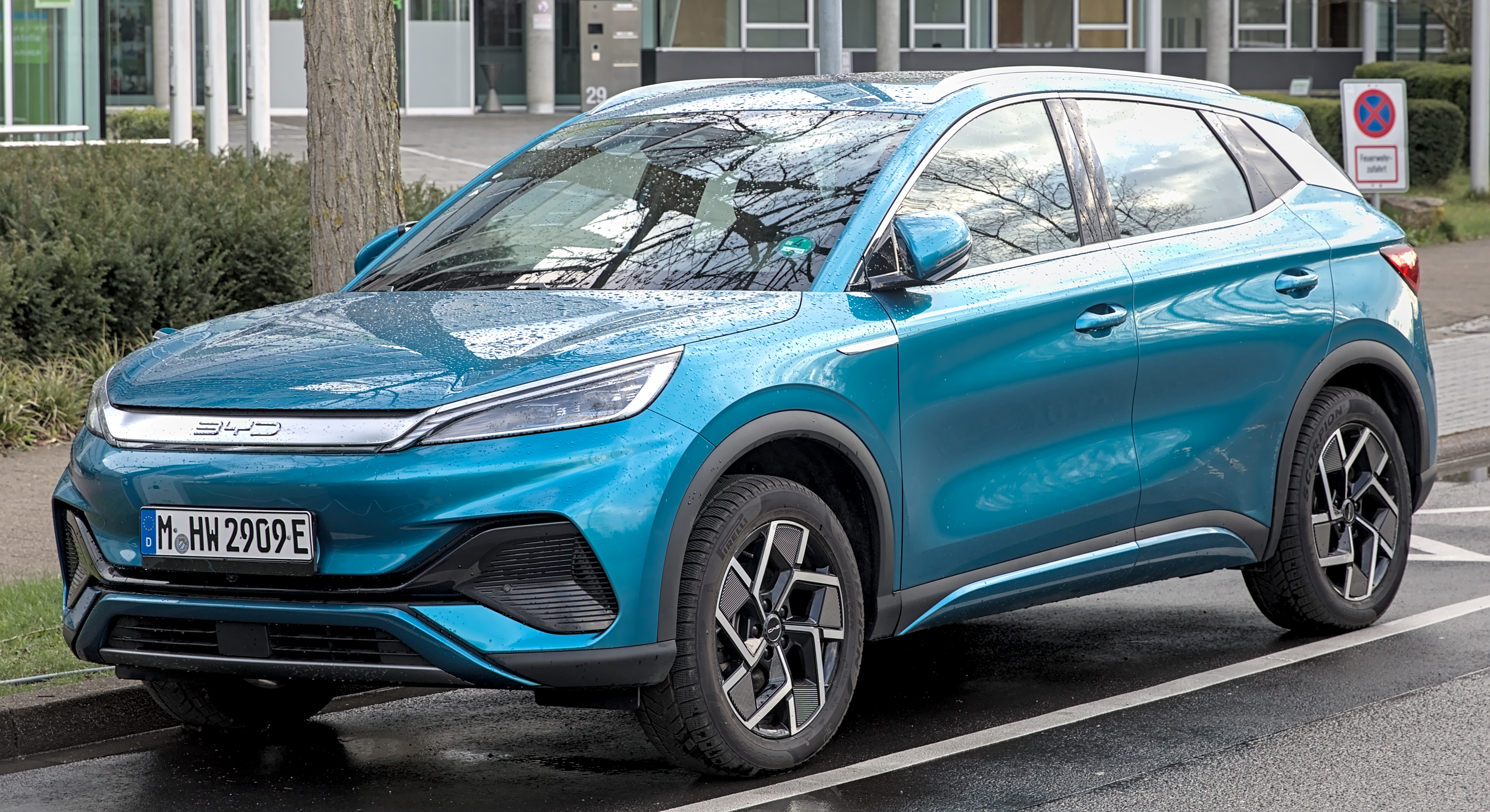
BYD Atto 3

News of a larger all-electric variant of the Yuan surfaced in July 2021, with the model being branded BYD Yuan Plus to differentiate it from the first generation Yuan that continued to be sold. The Yuan Plus is significantly larger than the Yuan and Yuan Pro, positioning it as a compact crossover. The model is branded BYD Atto 3 in international markets.

== Yuan Up (2024) ==
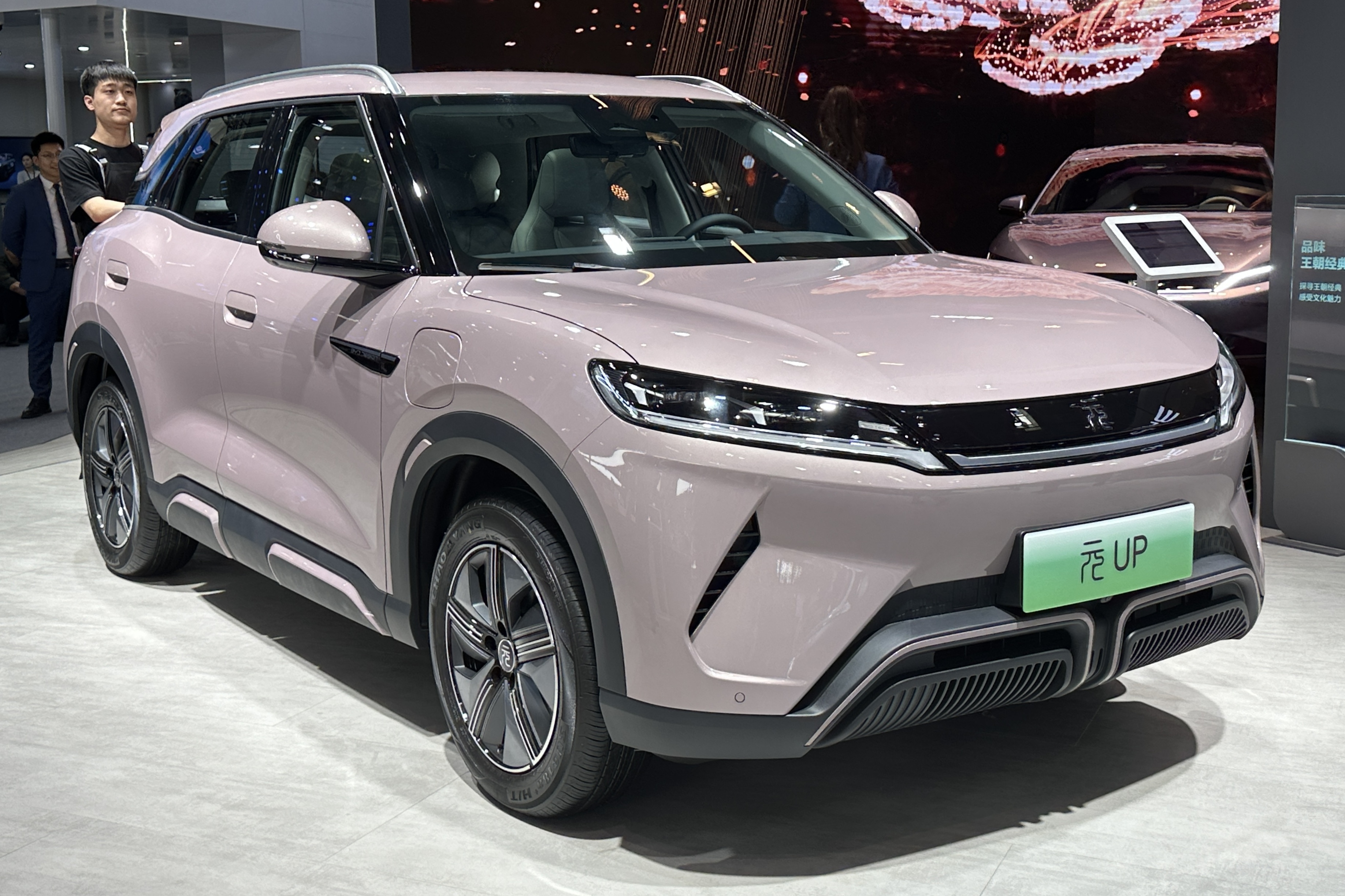
BYD Yuan Up

The successor of the Yuan Pro was released in February 2024 as the Yuan Up. The Yuan Up will continue to be positioned in the subcompact crossover segment under the larger Yuan Plus which is classified as a compact crossover. The model is branded BYD Yuan Pro, BYD S1 Pro and BYD Atto 2 in international markets.

== See also ==
- List of BYD Auto vehicles
