= BYD Sealion 06 =

Mid-size crossover SUV

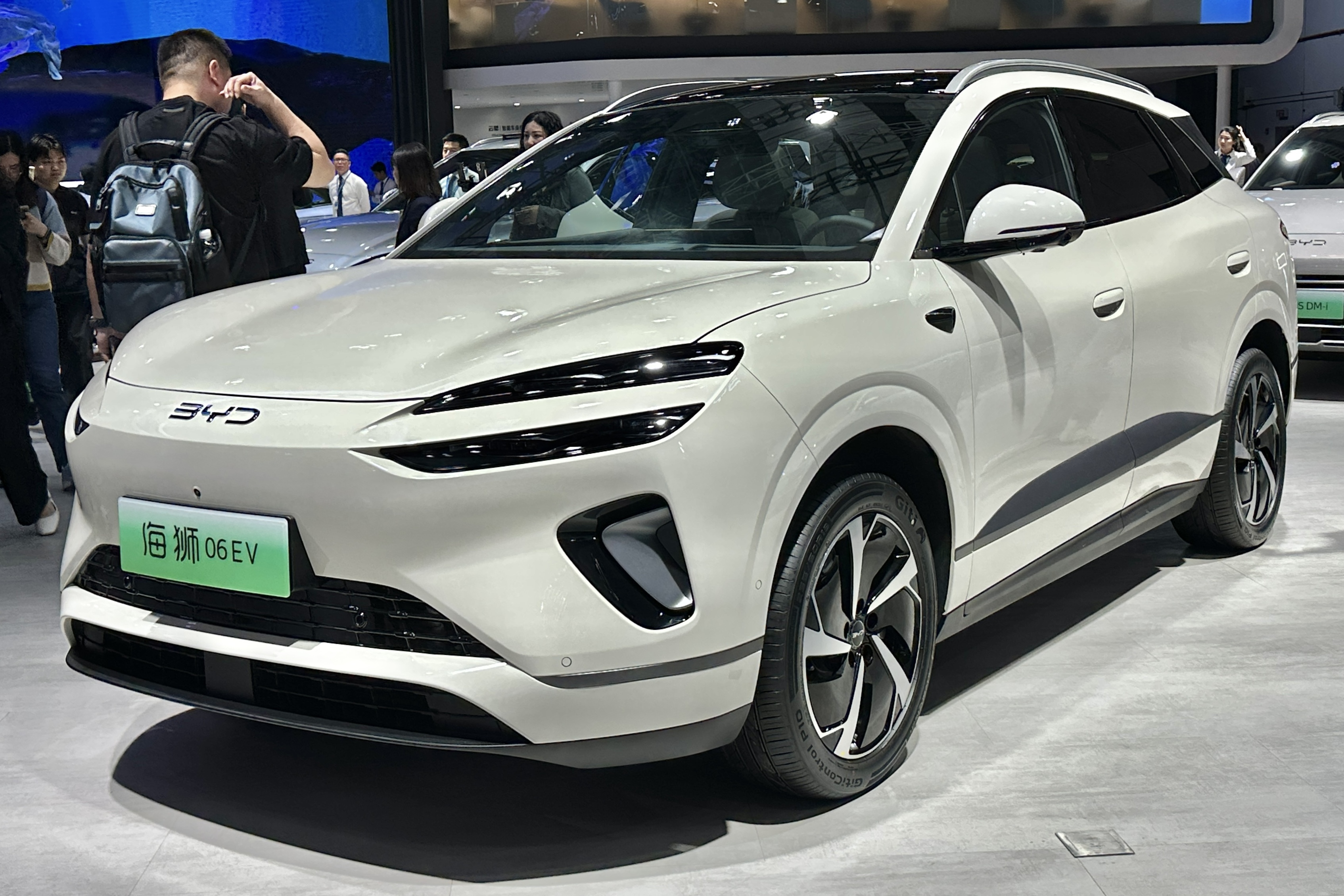
- BYD Sealion 06 EV

Overview
- Manufacturer: BYD Auto
- Also called: BYD Song Plus (Costa Rica)
- Production: July 2025 – present
- Assembly: China: Xi'an, Shaanxi
- Designer: Under the lead of Wolfgang Egger

Body and chassis
- Class: Mid-size SUV
- Body style: 5-door crossover SUV
- Layout: Front-engine, front-motor, front-wheel drive (DM-i); Rear-motor, rear-wheel drive (EV); Dual-motors, all-wheel drive (EV)
- Platform: DM-i 5.0 platform (DM-i); e-Platform 3.0 Evo (EV)
- Related: BYD Song Ultra; BYD Song L DM-i; BYD Qin L EV; BYD Seal 06 EV; BYD Sealion 05 (2025)

Powertrain
- Engine: Petrol plug-in hybrid: 1.5 L BYD476QC I4
- Electric motor: Permanent magnet synchronous
- Power output: 160 kW (215 hp; 218 PS) (DM-i); 170–290 kW (228–389 hp; 231–394 PS) (EV)
- Transmission: E-CVT (DM-i)
- Hybrid drivetrain: Plug-in hybrid (DM-i)
- Battery: 18.3 kWh BYD Blade LFP; 26.6 kWh BYD Blade LFP; 65.28 kWh BYD Blade LFP; 78.72 kWh BYD Blade LFP

Dimensions
- Wheelbase: 2,820 mm (111.0 in)
- Length: 4,810 mm (189.4 in)
- Width: 1,920 mm (75.6 in)
- Height: 1,675 mm (65.9 in)
- Curb weight: 1,890–2,190 kg (4,167–4,828 lb)

Chronology
- Predecessor: BYD Song Plus

The BYD Sealion 06 (Chinese: 比亚迪海獅06; pinyin: Bǐyǎdí Hǎishī 06) is a mid-size SUV manufactured by BYD Auto since 2025. Available with battery electric (EV) and plug-in hybrid (DM-i) powertrains, the model was introduced in April 2025 at the Auto Shanghai.

== Overview ==
The Sealion 06 is part of the "Sealion" (海狮; Hǎishī) line-up of SUVs under the Ocean Series product line-up that are distributed through Ocean Network dealerships in China. Production started in the third quarter of 2025.

It uses the latest Ocean Series design language with dual-layer headlights, wave-inspired taillights and smooth body lines. It features semi-hidden door handles.

Its interior features an integrated instrumental panel, 15.4-inch floating central display, and a duotone four-spoke steering wheel also seen in some other BYD models. The interior also has a refrigerator, panoramic sunroof, 12-speaker Dynaudio sound system, while the seats feature heating and air-sunction based ventilation features. It features a 757 L (26.7 cu ft) trunk that can be expanded to 1,630 L (58 cu ft) with the second row folded down, while EV versions also have a 142 L (5.0 cu ft) frunk.

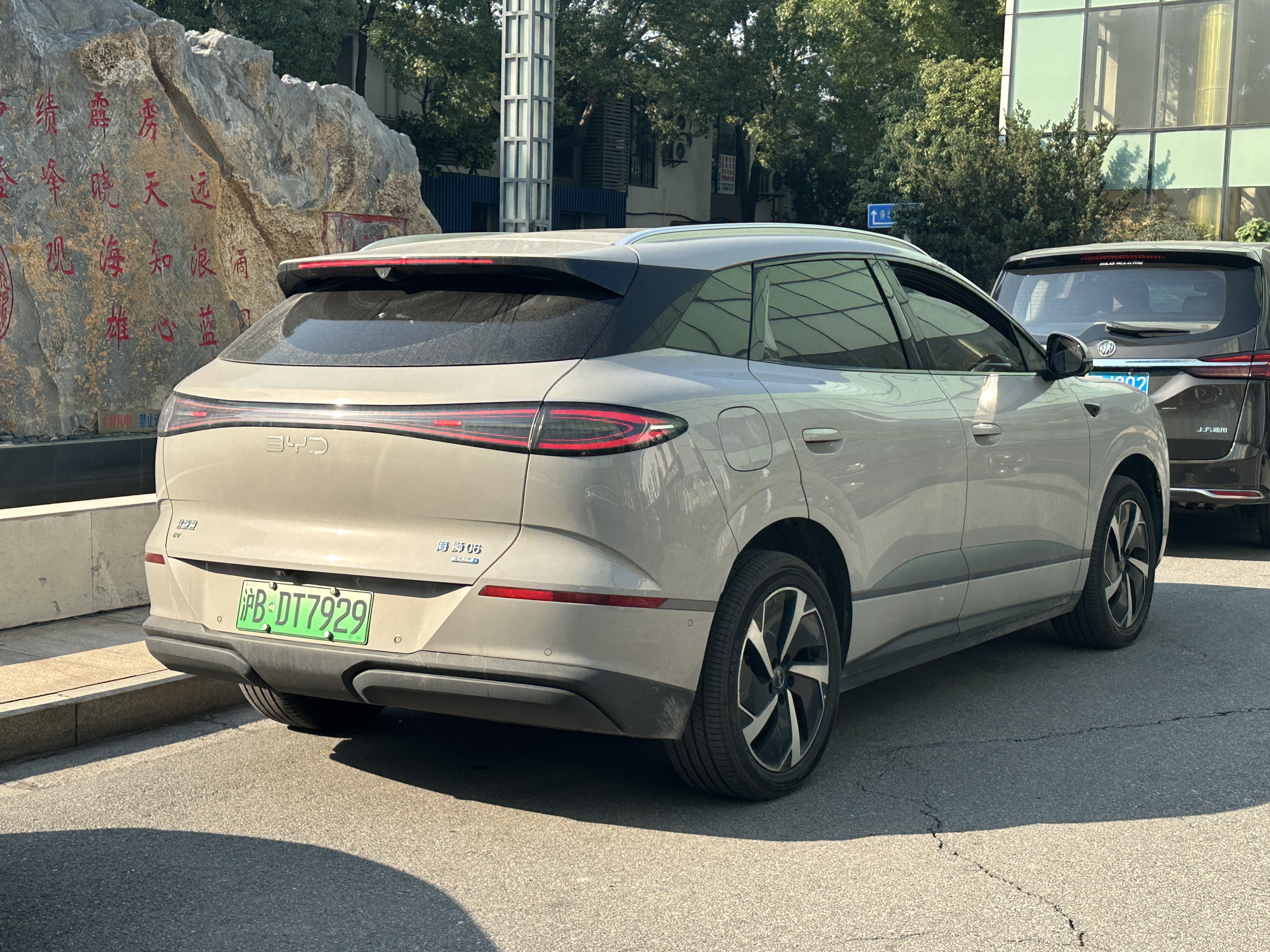
Rear view

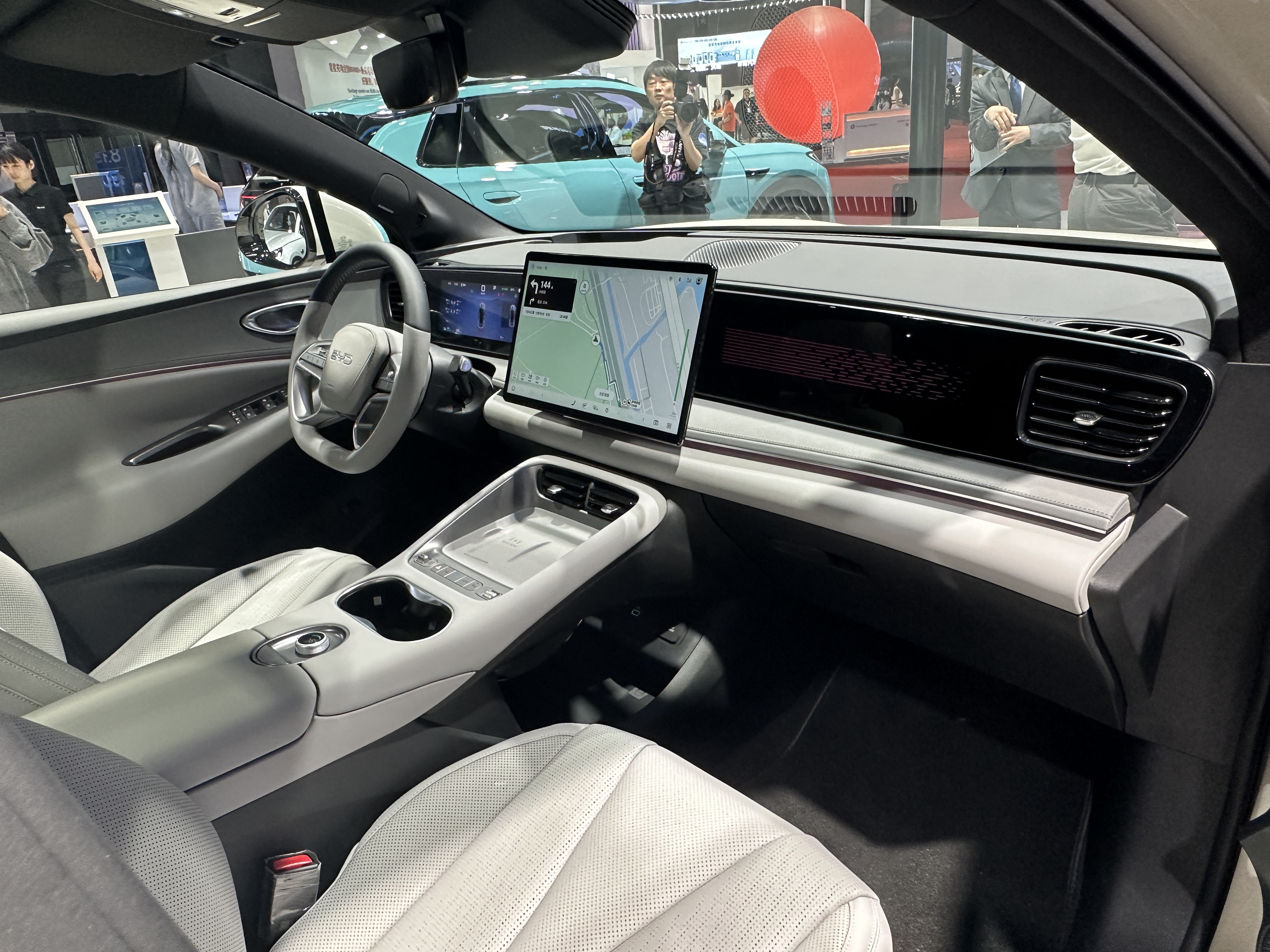
Interior

In March 2026, the Sealion 06 EV was updated to support BYD's Flash Charging 1,500 kW DC fast charging technology, supporting charging from 10% to 70% in 5 minutes, and 10% to 97% in 9 minutes.

== Powertrain ==
The Sealion 06 is available with both battery electric (EV) and plug-in hybrid (DM-i) powertrains.

DM-i variants pair a 1.5-liter engine producing 74 kW (99 hp; 101 PS) with a single electric motor producing 160 kW (210 hp; 220 PS). A blade (LFP) battery of either 18.3 kWh or 26.6 kWh capacities are offered, corresponding to a battery electric CLTC driving range of 93 km (58 mi) and 130 km (81 mi) respectively. Claimed combined range is 1,845 km (1,146 mi).

All EV variants are rear wheel drive only and are underpinned by either 400 or 800 volt platform depending on the trim level. Regardless, all EVs models both use a single motor configuration, with peak power outputs of 170 kW (230 hp; 230 PS) and 180 kW (240 hp; 240 PS) respectively. A blade (LFP) battery of either 65.3 kWh or 78.7 kWh capacities are offered, corresponding to a battery electric CLTC driving range of 520 km (320 mi) and 605 km (376 mi) respectively.

== Sales ==
Year	China		
Year	DM-i	EV	Total
2025	90,542	45,624	136,166

== See also ==
- List of BYD Auto vehicles
