= BYD Flash Charging =

Electric vehicle fast charging system

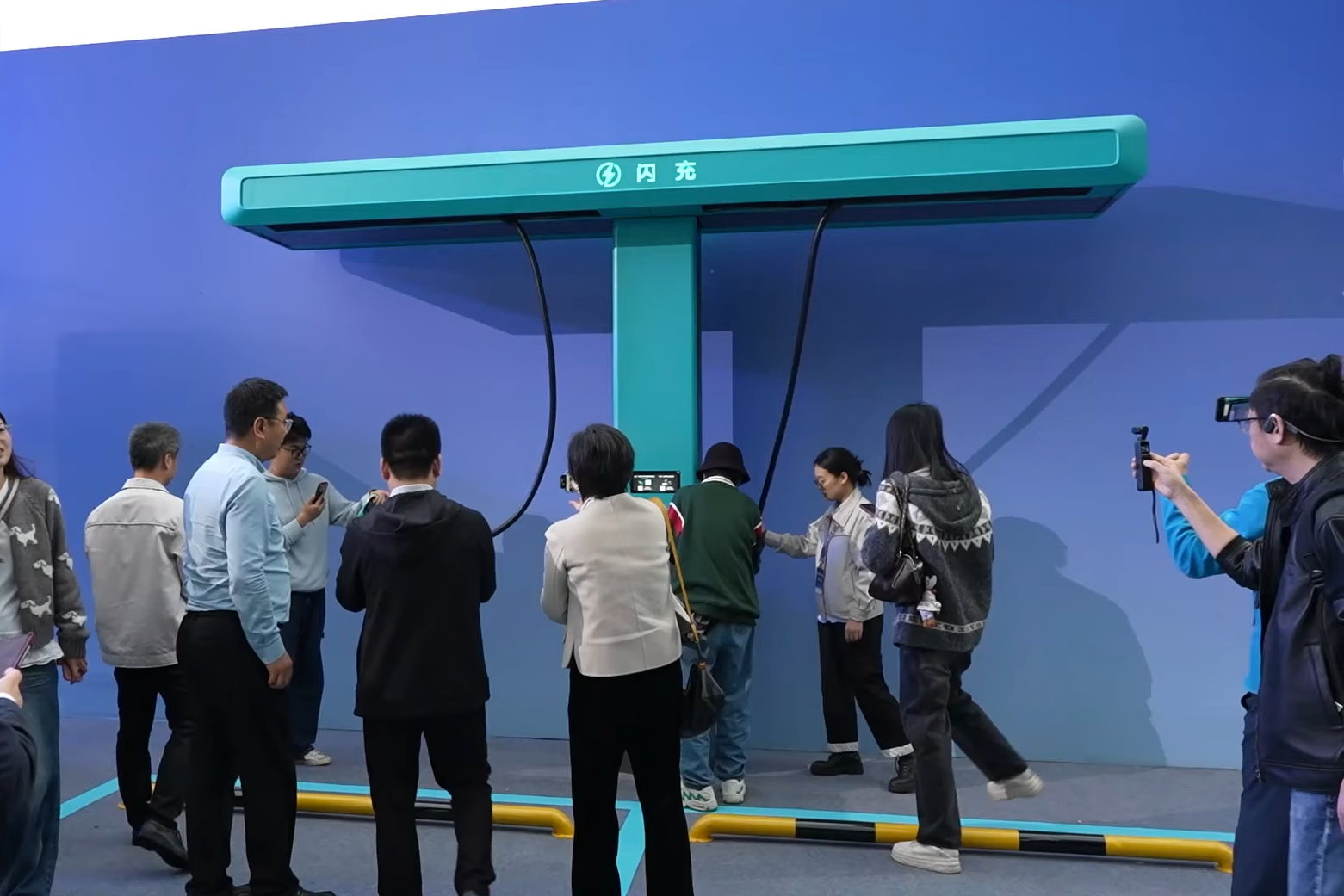
- Sample of BYD's Flash Charging station with its T-shaped design
- Established: March 5, 2026; 8 months ago
- Type: Electric vehicle charging network
- Region served: China; Europe; Indonesia; Malaysia; Thailand; India; Australia; New Zealand; UAE; Canada; Mexico; Brazil; Uruguay
- Owner: BYD Company

The BYD Flash Charging (Chinese: 比亚迪闪充; pinyin: Bǐyàdí Shǎnchōng), stylized as FLASH Charging, is an electric vehicle fast charging network consisting of high-power direct current (DC) system developed by the Chinese manufacturer BYD Company.

Introduced on 5 March 2026 during a conference in Shenzhen, China, the system has a maximum power delivery of 1,500 kW that is supported by an energy storage system to provide rapid charging times for electric vehicles without straining the local power grid. On a supported vehicle, system can charge the battery from a 10% to 70% state of charge in five minutes, and from 10% to 97% in nine minutes. In cold weather testing at −30 °C (−22 °F), the 10% to 97% charging duration took 12 minutes, adding only three minutes to the standard charging time.

While newer BYD models are specifically optimized for the charging system, the charging network is open to electric vehicles from any brand equipped with a 1,000V electrical architecture. BYD aims to build 20,000 Flash Charging stations in China by the end of 2026, as well as 6,000 stations outside China starting from Europe in mid-2026.

== Background ==
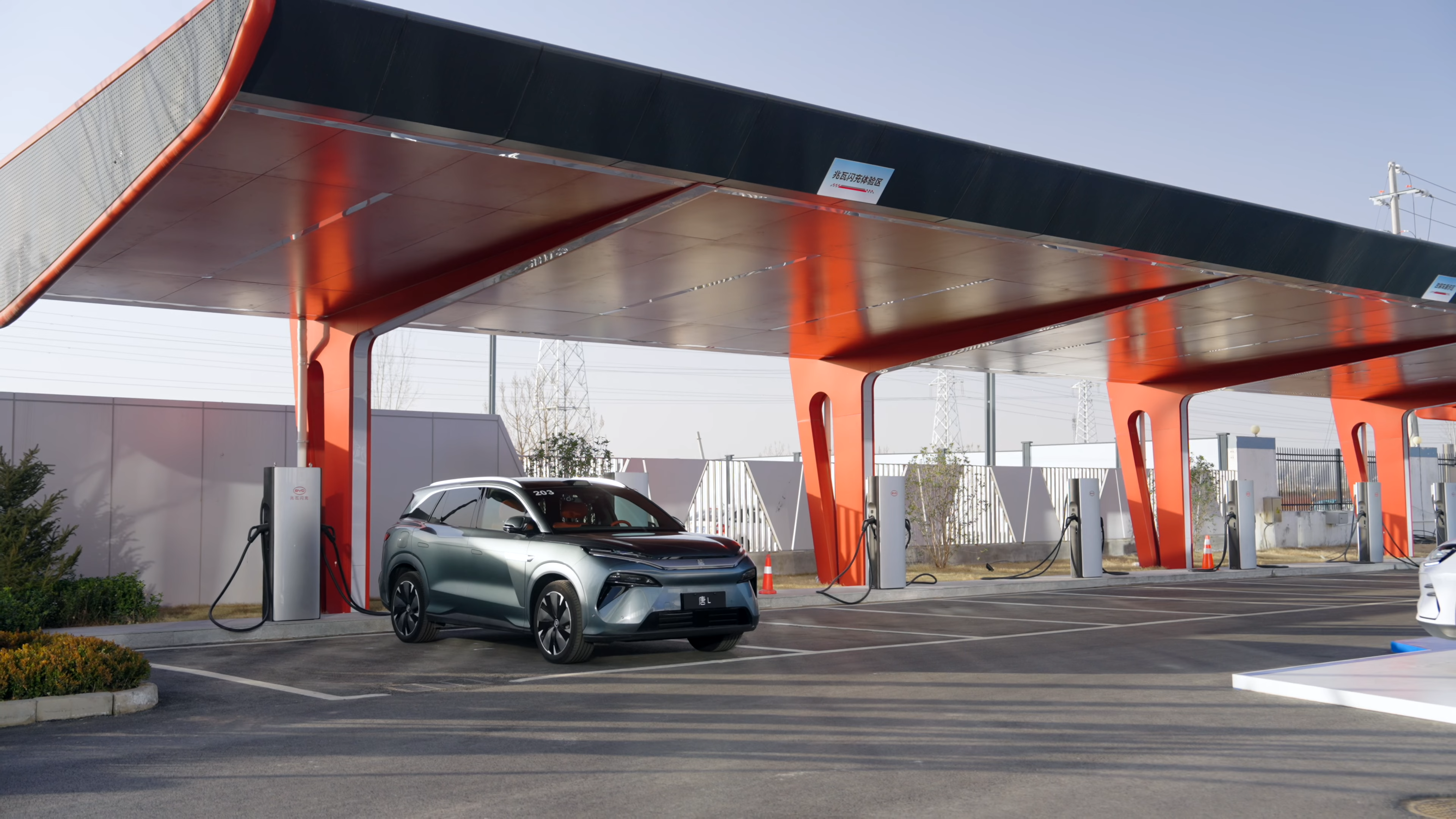
BYD's 1,000 kW (1 MW) charging station built in 2025

The 2026 system is the successor to BYD’s first-generation Megawatt charging technology, which was introduced in March 2025. That earlier standard provided a peak output of 1,000 kW and supported 10C charging rates on 1,000V platforms. The 2026 iteration increased this output to 1,500 kW and 1,500 A. The first vehicles configured to utilize the full capabilities of the 1 MW infrastructure are the BYD Han L and BYD Tang L.

During the launch event in Shenzhen on 5 March 2026, which featured presentations from twelve of the company's chief engineers, BYD chairman Wang Chuanfu stated that the system successfully makes electric vehicle charging as fast as refueling an internal combustion engine vehicle. Wang declared that achieving a charging speed that "did not exist in the world" represented a technological leap, and that this release marked the conclusion of the first half of the automotive electrification process. He also described the charging network as a "ready-to-use" technology rather than a future or conceptual project.

Wang also stated that the adoption of new energy vehicles is a component of national energy security. He noted that China depends on imports for over 70% of its oil consumption and characterized the transition to domestic electricity as a necessary step for long-term development. He also described the storage and charging integrated system as a "socially friendly" solution. Traditional charging stations operate at a grid utilization rate of approximately 5%, leaving substantial copper and electrical resources idle. By incorporating local energy storage, Wang claims the Flash Charging system increases this utilization rate to 95%. This optimizes existing electrical infrastructure and avoids the need for municipal power grid expansion, thereby lowering station construction costs by roughly 60%.

== Technical specifications ==
The technology operates on a 1,000V high-voltage architecture, delivering a peak current of 1,500 amperes to support a 10C charging rate. When paired with BYD's second-generation Blade Battery, the system charges a vehicle from a 10% to 70% state of charge in five minutes, and from 10% to 97% in nine minutes. The decision to cap the rapid charging metric at 97% capacity allows the vehicle's kinetic energy recovery system to function immediately through braking, which lowers overall energy consumption.

To maintain charging speeds in extreme climates, the system employs an "All-Temperature Intelligent Thermal Management System" alongside a specialized electrolyte designed to maintain high conductivity. This regulates internal temperatures and ensures uniform heat dissipation during high-power intake. In cold weather testing at −30 °C (−22 °F), the system can charge a battery from 20% to 97% in 12 minutes, which is a three-minute increase compared to standard room temperature operations.

=== Hardware ===
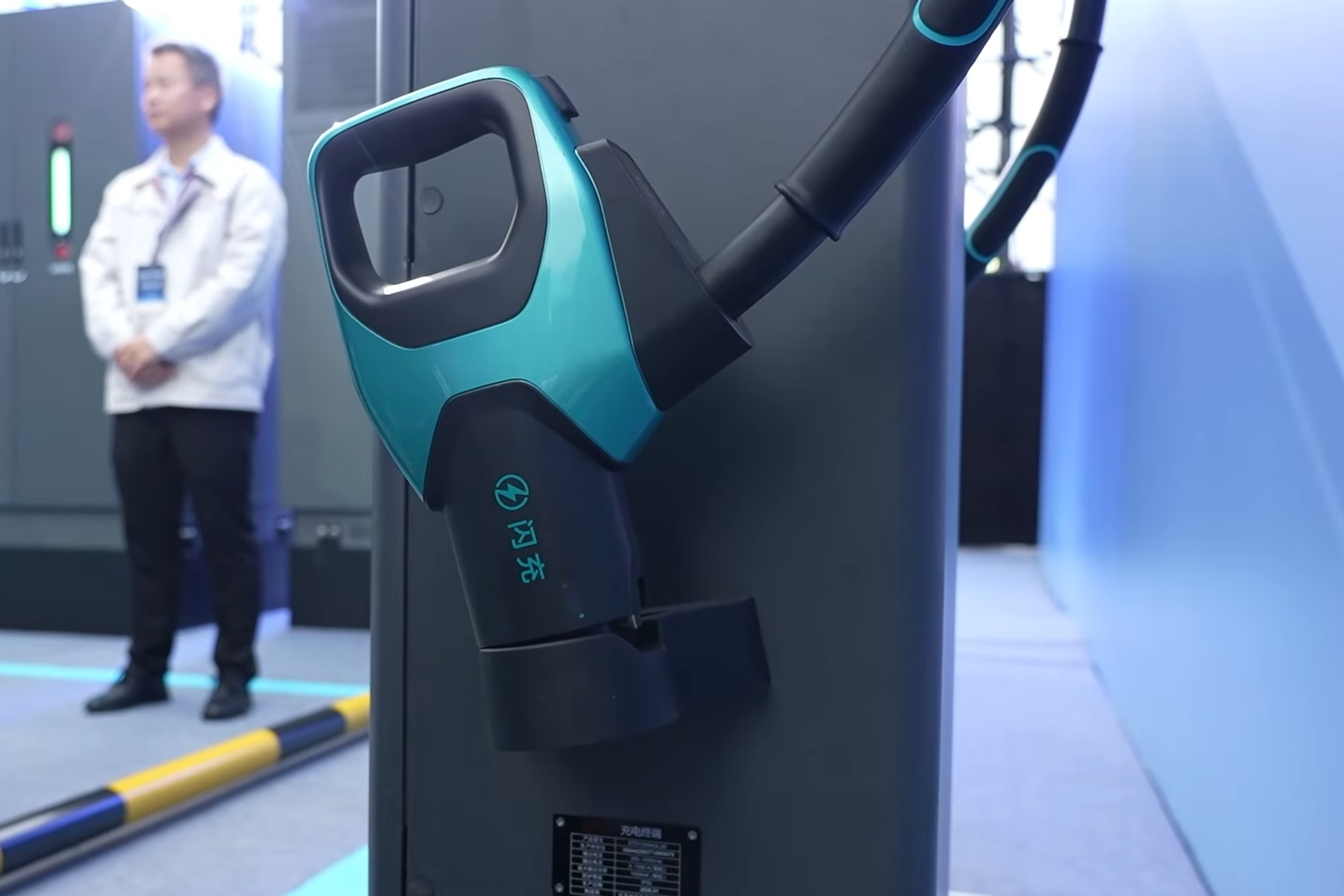
Flash Charging charging gun

The charging hardware utilizes a sliding-rail suspended T-type design. The hardware includes a more compact charging gun with dedicated waterproof protection. The liquid-cooled charging cable is suspended from an overhead track, preventing the cable from touching the ground and allowing the user to move the 2 kg (4.4 lb) "zero-gravity" charging gun laterally. This configuration permits access to charging ports on any side of the vehicle without requiring the driver to reposition the car. To maximize station availability and reduce gridlock, the infrastructure incorporates an automated parking and idle fee system for vehicles that occupy the space for extended periods after charging is complete.

On each Flash Charging station, there are two connectors that are able to charge two cars at the same time. When used simultaneously, the output is capped to 1,000 kW each. It is paired with an integrated energy storage system (ESS) to prevent the 1,500 kW output from overloading local municipal power grids. The standard ESS configuration includes two 185 kWh storage cabinets, providing a total buffer of 370 kWh per terminal. The ESS charges from the grid during off-peak hours and discharges rapidly during vehicle charging sessions. Depending on local infrastructure and vehicle traffic, the ESS is able to draw energy from the grid from roughly 100 kW and up to 560 kW when necessary. This localized power amplification maintains a consistent 1,500 kW output even when multiple vehicles charge simultaneously, while reducing station construction costs by avoiding the need for municipal power grid expansion.

=== Second-generation BYD Blade battery ===
The charging system relies on BYD's second-generation Blade battery, which introduces modifications to the internal chemistry and physical structure of the original lithium iron phosphate design. The battery utilizes a full-link ion architecture named FlashPass. This includes a cathode designed with multi-level particle size directional construction for denser packing, an electrolyte optimized by artificial intelligence algorithms for higher conductivity, and an anode featuring penetrated migration channels for faster ion insertion.

These modifications yield a 5% increase in energy density compared to the first generation, supporting maximum ranges of over 1,000 kilometers under CLTC testing conditions, as demonstrated by the Denza Z9GT.

Safety and durability testing parameters were expanded for this iteration. The battery passed nail penetration tests while actively charging after completing 500 rapid-charge cycles. Additional testing included bottom impacts at ten times the force required by national standards and thermal diffusion tests involving four simultaneous cell short circuits, which resulted in no fires or explosions.

BYD also adjusted the degradation standards for the battery's warranty. The lifetime warranty for the battery cells remains, while the capacity retention threshold was raised by 2.5% across all warranty periods. The guaranteed capacity retention is set at 87.5% at two years or 50,000 kilometres (31,000 miles), 77.5% at six years or 150,000 kilometres (93,000 miles), and 72.5% at eight years or 150,000 kilometres. If the capacity drops below these thresholds within the specified timeframes, BYD would replace the battery.

== Economics ==
According to internal calculations by BYD, a single Flash Charging station would be able to serve 200 to 300 vehicles per day, with a single charging gun serving an average of 50 vehicles per day. Based on a price of 1.3 yuan per kWh, the average daily revenue per station is between 5,000 and 8,000 yuan. After accounting for operating expenses such as electricity, equipment depreciation, site leasing, and maintenance, the projected investment payback period is 2.5 to 3 years. BYD anticipates this financial model will incentivize private investment to accelerate the network's ongoing construction.

== Rollout ==
=== In China ===
The deployment of the network is guided by the "Flash Charge China" strategy, which targets 20,000 operational stations by the end of 2026. The rollout is divided into "Station-in-Station" installations, which add 1,500 kW terminals to existing public charging hubs, and "Highway Flash Stations" located at expressway service areas. By mid-April 2026, BYD had established over 5,000 stations, including a specialized high-altitude station in the Mount Everest region. The company committed to completing 1,000 highway stations before the May 1st holiday travel period.

To manage network visibility, BYD partnered with digital aggregation platforms such as LongShine Technology's XinDianTu, integrating the Flash Charging stations into a broader digital map accessible to millions of registered EV users. Additionally, BYD introduced a "Dream Station" crowdsourcing initiative, allowing groups of four or more vehicle owners to petition for station installations in specific geographic locations that meet the required land and power conditions.

On 28 August 2026, six months after the network's introduction, BYD opened the 10,000th Flash Charging station in Shenzhen.

=== Outside China ===
Following the initial domestic implementation, BYD announced an international expansion strategy termed "Flash Charging Planet" (闪充星球). The Flash Charging was introduced to the European market on 8 April 2026, with initial overseas deployments are scheduled for mid-2026 to coincide with the European market launch of the Denza Z9GT. BYD announced the slogan 'Ready in 5, Full in 9, Cold Add 3' to promote the charging system in Europe.

The chargers will mostly be built at existing charging locations, will be open to any car brands, and will use the CCS2 charging standard as opposed to the Chinese market GB/T standards. BYD will offer 18 months of free charging at Flash Charging stations for early Denza Z9 GT buyers in the United Kingdom.

In June 2026, BYD Malaysia confirmed that it will develop the Flash Charging network throughout the country.

In Indonesia, the Flash Charging was introduced on 14 October 2026, along with the Z9GT and the refreshed Danza D9. During its introduction, Flash Charging locations has been built in 10 Danza dealerships.

== Compatibility ==
Within BYD's lineup, the first vehicles configured to utilize the second-generation Blade battery and Flash Charging technology are the Yangwang U7, Denza N9, Fangchengbao Tai 3, Seal 07 EV, Datang, Sealion 06, Song Ultra, Fangchengbao Ti7, Denza Z9 GT (which achieves an operating range of 1,036 km (644 mi)), and the Yangwang U8L. Models equipped with the Flash Charging technology are designated by a rear exterior badge. Customers purchasing these models receive one year of complementary charging on the Flash Charging network.

The 1,500 kW network is also open to all electric vehicles, including models from competing manufacturers, as long as the vehicles are equipped with a 1,000V electrical architecture.

=== Fully compatible vehicles ===
As of October 2026, at least 29 battery electric models and 9 plug-in hybrid models produced by BYD supports native Flash Charging with 10% to 70% state of charge in five minutes, and from 10% to 97% in nine minutes.

==== Battery electric ====
- BYD Atto 8 EV (2026–present, Europe)
- BYD Dahan EV (2026–present)
- BYD Datang EV (2026–present)
- BYD ETT 44 (2026–present, 20% to 80% in about 20 minutes)
- BYD Han EV Flash Charging Edition (2026–present)
- BYD M6 EV (2026–present)
- BYD Qin Max EV (2026–present)
- BYD Seagull (second generation) (2026–present, 420 km variant)
- BYD Seal 06 EV (2026–present)
- BYD Seal 06 GT (2026–present)
- BYD Seal 07 EV (2026–present)
- BYD Seal 08 EV (2026–present)
- BYD Sealion 05 EV (2026–present)
- BYD Sealion 06 EV (2026–present)
- BYD Sealion 08 EV (2026–present)
- BYD Song Ultra EV (2026–present)
- BYD Qin Max EV (2026–present)
- BYD Tang EV (third generation) (2026–present)
- BYD Yuan Plus (second generation) (2026–present)
- Denza D9 EV (2026–present)
- Denza N8 EV (second generation) (2026–present)
- Denza N8L EV (2026–present)
- Denza Z9 GT (2026–present)
- Denza Z9S (2026–present)
- Denza Z (2026–present)
- Fangchengbao Tai 3 (2026–present)
- Fangchengbao Ti7 EV (2026–present)
- Fangchengbao Formula S (2026–present)
- Linghui e7 (2026–present)

===== Plug-in hybrid =====
- BYD Seal 08 DM-i/DM-p (2026–present)
- BYD Sealion 08 DM-i/DM-p (2026–present)
- Denza D9 DM-i (2026–present)
- Denza N8L plug-in hybrid (2026–present)
- Denza N9 Flash Charging Edition (2026–present)
- Fangchengbao Ti9 (2026–present)
- Yangwang U7 plug-in hybrid (2026–present)
- Yangwang U8 (2026–present)
- Yangwang U8L (2026–present)

== See also ==
- Tesla Supercharger
