= Fangchengbao Ti7 =

Mid-size SUV

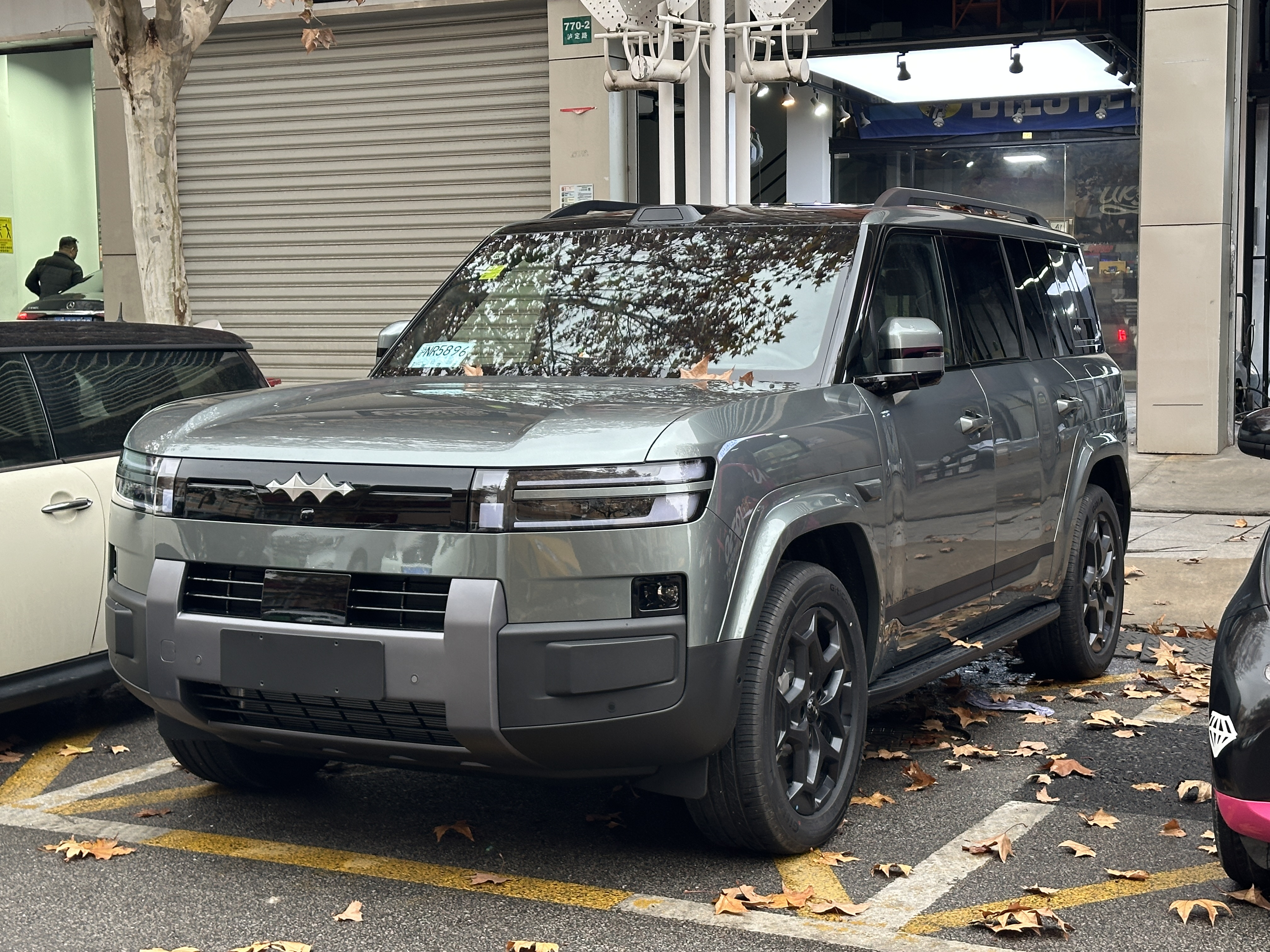

Overview
- Manufacturer: BYD Auto
- Also called: BYD Ti 7 (export); BYD Titan 7 (Indonesia)
- Production: August 2025 – present
- Assembly: China: Changsha, Hunan; Hefei, Anhui; Jinan, Shandong; Indonesia: Subang, West Java (BYD Auto Indonesia)
- Designer: Under the lead of Wolfgang Egger

Body and chassis
- Class: Mid-size SUV
- Body style: 5-door SUV
- Layout: DM: Front-engine, rear-motor, rear-wheel-drive; Front-engine, dual-motor, all-wheel-drive; Battery electric: Rear-motor, rear-wheel-drive; Dual-motor, all-wheel-drive
- Platform: Evo+ platform
- Chassis: Unibody
- Related: Fangchengbao Tai 3

Powertrain
- Engine: Petrol plug-in hybrid: 1.5 L BYD472ZQB turbo I4
- Electric motor: DM: Permanent magnet synchronous (rear, front on AWD); Battery electric: Permanent magnet synchronous (rear); Induction (front, AWD)
- Power output: DM: 115 kW (154 hp; 156 PS) (engine); 200 kW (268 hp; 272 PS) (rear motor); 160 kW (215 hp; 218 PS) (front motor); 360 kW (483 hp; 489 PS) (combined motors, AWD); Battery electric: 300 kW (402 hp; 408 PS) (RWD); 515 kW (691 hp; 700 PS) (AWD)
- Battery: DM: 26.6, 35.6 and 50.0 kWh LFP Blade; Battery electric: 92.1 and 105.8 kWh LFP Blade; Supplied by FinDreams
- Electric range: DM: 135–315 km (84–196 mi) (CLTC); Battery electric: 675–755 km (419–469 mi) (CLTC)
- Plug-in charging: DM: up to 158 kW DC; Battery electric: Flash Charging

Dimensions
- Wheelbase: 2,920 mm (115.0 in)
- Length: 4,999 mm (196.8 in) (2-row); 5,146 mm (202.6 in) (3-row)
- Width: 1,995 mm (78.5 in)
- Height: 1,865 mm (73.4 in)
- Curb weight: 2,230–2,610 kg (4,916–5,754 lb)

The Fangchengbao Ti7 (Chinese: 方程豹 钛7; lit. 'Formula leopard Titanium 7') is a mid-size SUV manufactured by BYD Auto under the Fangchengbao brand since 2025, offered as a plug-in hybrid and, since April 2026, as a battery electric vehicle. It is the second model in the "Ti" (钛, Tai) series of the brand after the Tai 3.

The model is exported as the BYD Ti 7, and some export markets receive a seven-seat layout that is not offered in China.

== History ==
The Fangchengbao Ti7 is the second model in the "Ti" series of Fangchengbao, a brand launched by BYD in 2023, following the smaller Tai 3. Prototypes were seen undergoing road tests in China before BYD released an official teaser on 7 June 2025, and spy photos of the interior surfaced two days later. The name was confirmed on 11 June 2025, and the core specifications were published through a Ministry of Industry and Information Technology (MIIT) filing on 20 June 2025.

Production started on 11 August 2025. The first Fangchengbao Ti7 to roll off the assembly line was painted in silver-blue and fitted with a roof-mounted lidar sensor. The Fangchengbao Ti7 was launched in China in September 2025 with four five-seat trims in rear-wheel-drive and all-wheel-drive configurations, and deliveries began at the same time. It reached 50,000 sales within 80 days of its launch.

In late November 2025, it made its international debut in Thailand as the BYD Ti 7.

A battery electric version of the Fangchengbao Ti7 was revealed in February 2026 through an MIIT filing, and it was launched on 29 April 2026. It supports BYD's Flash Charging. On 18 August 2026, Fangchengbao added a long-range DM version of the plug-in hybrid with a larger 50 kWh battery.

In May 2026, BYD confirmed a three-row, seven-seat version of the BYD Ti 7 for export markets, starting with the United Kingdom.

=== Exterior ===
Similar to other Fangchengbao vehicles, the Ti7 has a boxy body with clean surfaces, a high bonnet line, angular body sculpting, and large bumpers finished in a contrasting color, together with a floating roof design. The front end uses rectangular headlights and a small grille, while the roof is fitted with roof rails, and for the Chinese market, the top all-wheel-drive trim carries a lidar sensor mounted above the windshield. The Ti7 rides on 19-inch or 20-inch wheels, and it was offered at launch in seven exterior colors, including two shades of green, silver, gold, blue, black and gray.

At the rear, the Ti7 has a heavy side-hinged tailgate that swings out. The Chinese-market model measures 4,999 mm (197 in) in length with a 2,920 mm (115 in) wheelbase, and it has an approach angle of 24 degrees, a departure angle of 25 degrees, and a maximum wading depth of 600 mm (24 in).

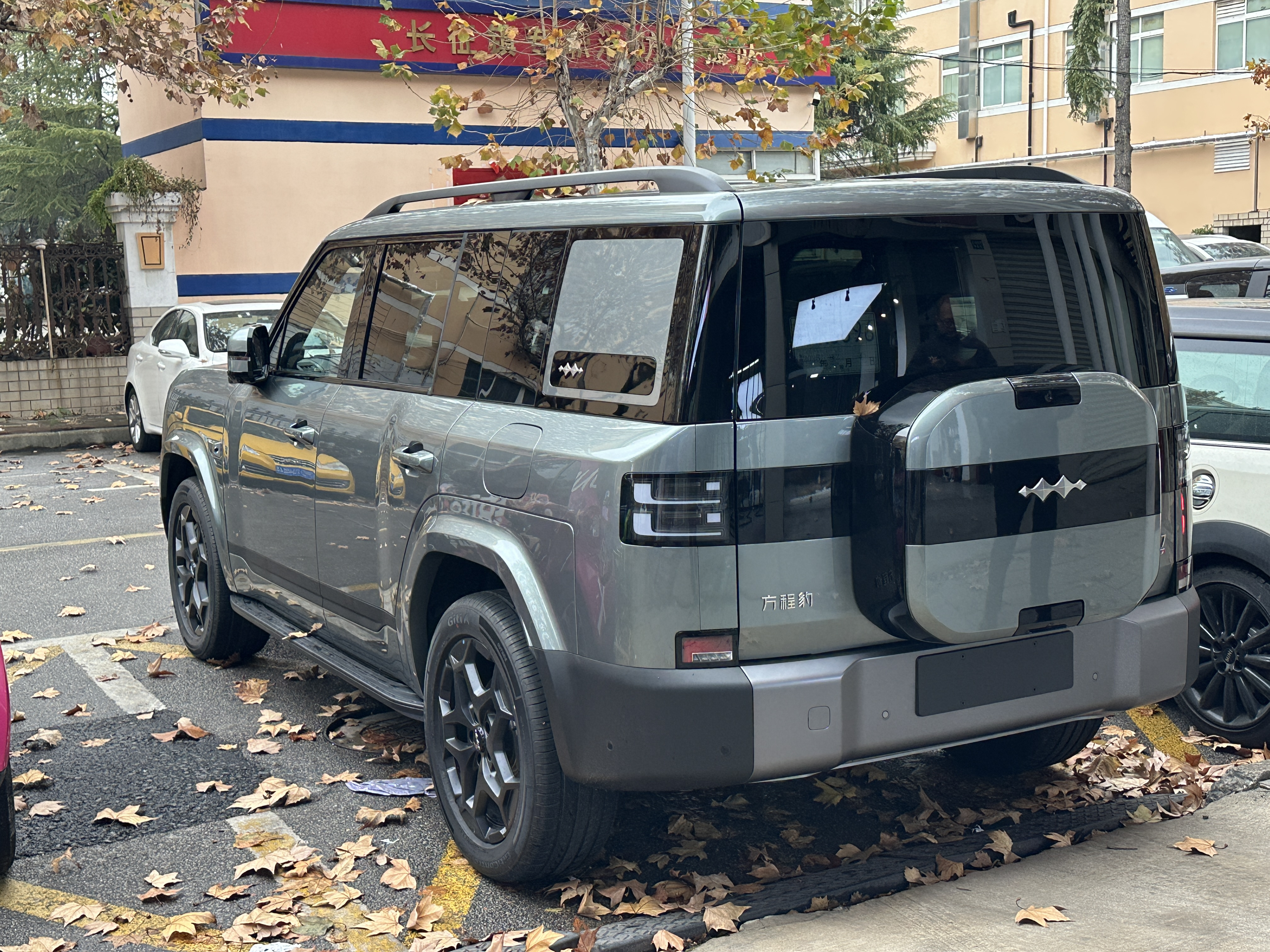
Rear view

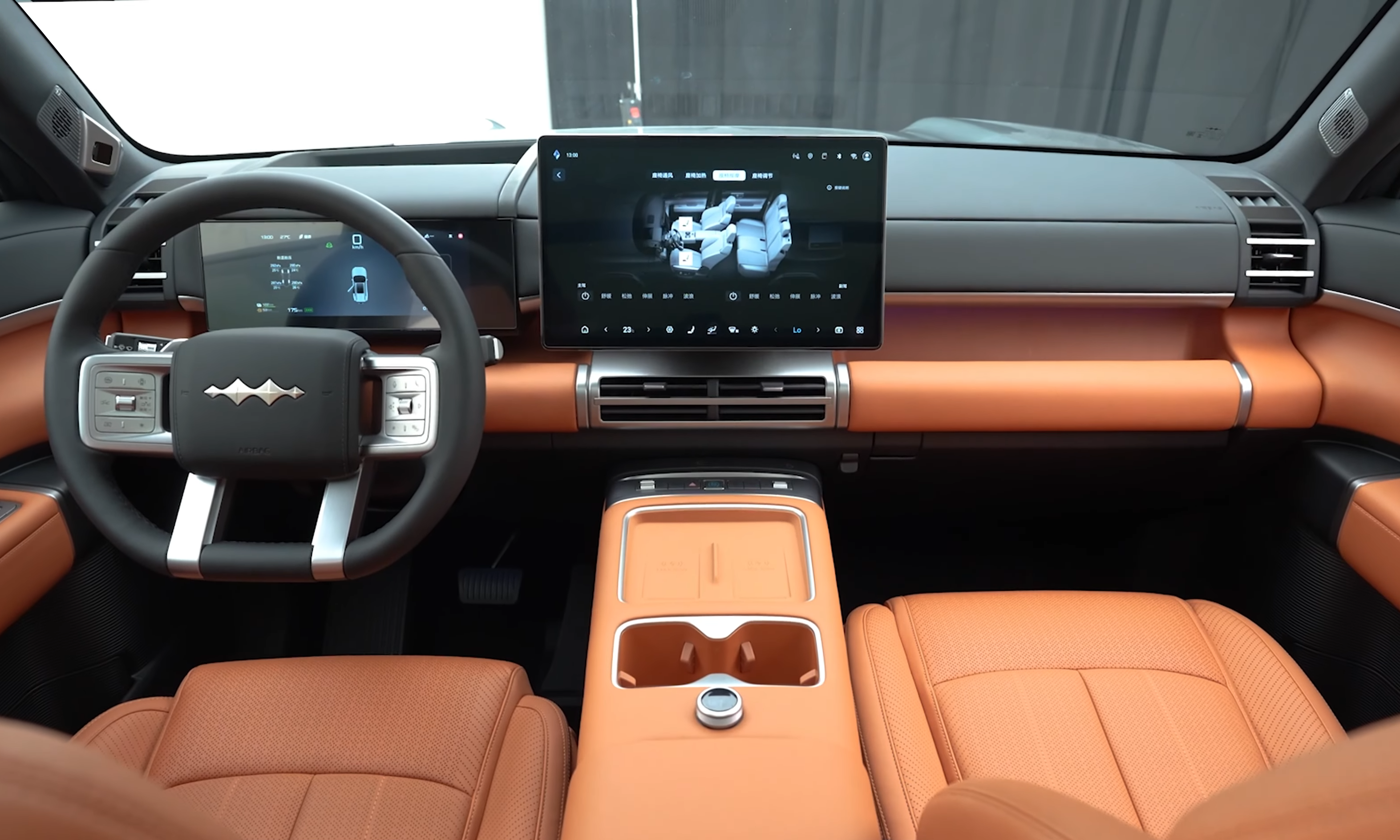
Interior

=== Interior ===
The Chinese-market Fangchengbao Ti7 is a five-seater with a 60:40 split-folding second row, and it provides up to 1,880 L (66 cu ft) of cargo space when the second row is folded, along with up to 45 storage spaces throughout the cabin. The dashboard is dominated by a large floating central touchscreen, with a D-shaped four-spoke steering wheel and a gear selector mounted on the steering column, replacing the center-console shifter used in other Fangchengbao models.

The cabin uses seven screens, consisting of a 15.6-inch central touchscreen, a 12.3-inch digital instrument panel, a 26-inch windshield head-up display, two climate control screens, and two 13-inch screens for rear passengers. The front seats are heated and ventilated with a massage function, and other equipment includes a panoramic sunroof, independent air vents for the second row, a sound system with up to 20 speakers, wireless phone charging, ambient lighting, and a power outlet in the cargo area. A 4.5 L refrigerator is built into the center armrest and operates between −6 °C (21 °F) and 50 °C (122 °F).

=== Seven-seat version ===
For export markets, BYD developed a seven-seat version of the BYD Ti 7 with three rows of seating, which is not offered in China. BYD states that the seven-seat layout was developed "specifically" for the European and United Kingdom markets. The UK-spec model provides 126 L (4.4 cu ft) of luggage space with all seven seats in use, 970 L (34 cu ft) with the third row folded, and 1,830 L (65 cu ft) with the second and third rows folded.

The seven-seat models carry a spare wheel in a carrier mounted on the side-hinged tailgate. The overall length was increased to 5,146 mm (202.6 in), compared with the 4,999 mm (196.8 in) quoted for the Chinese market model. Its width, height, and wheelbase remain unchanged. The BYD Ti 7 remains available with five seats in certain markets.

=== Chassis and driver assistance ===
Unlike the ladder-frame Bao 5 and Bao 8, the Ti7 uses a unibody structure, with double-wishbone front suspension, five-link rear suspension, and BYD's DiSus-C intelligent body control system. It also features a tire stability control function that lifts the wheel with a punctured tire, allowing the vehicle to continue driving for up to 30 km (19 mi) at speeds of up to 80 km/h (50 mph).

The top all-wheel-drive trim in China is equipped with the "God's Eye" B (DiPilot 300) advanced driver-assistance system, which uses the roof-mounted lidar and an Nvidia Orin-X chip to support highway and urban navigation assistance as well as automated parking, and it can be optioned with a vehicle-mounted drone system. Other trims use the "God's Eye" C system with highway navigation assistance.

== Powertrain ==
=== Plug-in hybrid ===
The plug-in hybrid Ti7 uses BYD's DM system with a 1.5-liter turbocharged inline-four engine producing 115 kW (154 hp; 156 PS), paired with a 200 kW (268 hp; 272 PS) rear motor that is fitted to every version. All-wheel-drive versions add a 160 kW (215 hp; 218 PS) front motor, giving a combined motor output of 360 kW (483 hp; 489 PS).

At launch, all versions used LFP Blade batteries made by BYD's battery subsidiary FinDreams, with lower-priced versions using a 26.6 kWh battery and higher-priced versions using a 35.6 kWh battery for a CLTC electric range of 135–200 km (84–124 mi). The long-range DM version launched in August 2026 uses a 50 kWh battery, giving an electric range of 315 km (196 mi) for the rear-wheel-drive Max and 300 km (186 mi) for the all-wheel-drive Ultra, while peak DC charging power increases to 158 kW.

=== Battery electric ===
Released in April 2026, the battery electric Ti7 uses a 300 kW (402 hp; 408 PS) rear motor, and all-wheel-drive versions add a 215 kW (288 hp; 292 PS) front induction motor for a combined output of 515 kW (691 hp; 700 PS). It is offered with 92.1 kWh and 105.8 kWh second-generation Blade batteries, with a CLTC range of up to 755 km (469 mi), and supports Flash Charging, which BYD claims can charge the battery from 10 to 97% in about nine minutes and from 20 to 97% in about 12 minutes at −30 °C (−22 °F).

Battery		Motor		Power	Torque	Electric range		DC charging			0–100 km/h (62 mph)	Top speed	Kerb weight
Capacity	Weight	Front	Rear	Power	Torque	WLTP	CLTC	Peak	30–80%	10–97%	0–100 km/h (62 mph)	Top speed	Kerb weight
PHEV
26.593 kWh	227 kg (500 lb)	—	200 kW TZ210XYD PMSM	268 hp (200 kW; 272 PS)	315 N⋅m (232 lb⋅ft)	105 km (65 mi)	135 km (84 mi)	54 kW	17.5 min	—	7.9 s	190 km/h (118 mph)	2,230 kg (4,916 lb)
35.624 kWh	292 kg (644 lb)	—	200 kW TZ210XYD PMSM	268 hp (200 kW; 272 PS)	315 N⋅m (232 lb⋅ft)	140 km (87 mi)	200 km (124 mi)	73 kW	17.5 min	—	7.5 s	190 km/h (118 mph)	2,300 kg (5,071 lb)
35.624 kWh	292 kg (644 lb)	160 kW TZ210XYC PMSM	200 kW TZZ200XSBN PMSM	483 hp (360 kW; 490 PS)	490 N⋅m (361 lb⋅ft)	130 km (81 mi)	190 km (118 mi)	73 kW	17.5 min	—	4.5 s	190 km/h (118 mph)	2,480 kg (5,467 lb)
50.001 kWh	384 kg (847 lb)	—	200 kW TZ210XYD PMSM	268 hp (200 kW; 272 PS)	315 N⋅m (232 lb⋅ft)	230 km (143 mi)	315 km (196 mi)	158 kW	14 min	—	7.9 s	190 km/h (118 mph)	2,350 kg (5,181 lb)
50.001 kWh	384 kg (847 lb)	160 kW TZ210XYC PMSM	200 kW TZZ200XSBN PMSM	483 hp (360 kW; 490 PS)	490 N⋅m (361 lb⋅ft)	210 km (130 mi)	300 km (186 mi)	158 kW	14 min	—	4.5 s	190 km/h (118 mph)	2,530 kg (5,578 lb)
EV
92.093 kWh	633 kg (1,396 lb)	—	300 kW TS205QYD PMSM	402 hp (300 kW; 408 PS)	365 N⋅m (269 lb⋅ft)	—	675 km (419 mi)	—	—	9 min	7.3 s	240 km/h (149 mph)	2,366 kg (5,216 lb)
105.792 kWh	755.5 kg (1,666 lb)	—	300 kW TS205QYD PMSM	402 hp (300 kW; 408 PS)	365 N⋅m (269 lb⋅ft)	—	755 km (469 mi)	—	—	9 min	7.5 s	240 km/h (149 mph)	2,500 kg (5,512 lb)
105.792 kWh	755.5 kg (1,666 lb)	215 kW YS230XYF induction	300 kW TS205QYD PMSM	690 hp (515 kW; 700 PS)	675 N⋅m (498 lb⋅ft)	—	675 km (419 mi)	—	—	9 min	4.5 s	240 km/h (149 mph)	2,610 kg (5,754 lb)

== International markets ==
The Ti7 is sold outside China under the BYD brand, and it is available in either a five-seat or a seven-seat layout depending on the market.

=== Asia-Pacific ===
The Ti7 made its international debut in Thailand in late November 2025, where a left-hand-drive display car with Chinese badging was shown as the export version of the Fangchengbao Ti7.

==== Uzbekistan ====
In Uzbekistan, BYD launched the BYD Ti 7 on 1 October 2026 at an electric mobility event in Tashkent, initially as a five-seat, all-wheel-drive plug-in hybrid using the DM-p system.

==== Philippines ====
BYD Philippines confirmed in September 2026 that the BYD Ti 7 will be offered in the country as a plug-in hybrid with single-motor and dual-motor versions, after the model was added to the Department of Energy's list of recognized electric vehicles in August 2026.

==== Australia ====
In Australia, the BYD Ti 7 received Australian Design Rule certification in November 2026 with a 200 kW (268 hp) two-wheel-drive variant and a 300 kW (402 hp) all-wheel-drive variant, both of which are plug-in hybrids with seven seats.

=== Europe and United Kingdom ===
BYD UK confirmed the BYD Ti 7 in May 2026 as its first seven-seat vehicle for the United Kingdom, and it opened orders on 31 July 2026 with a single all-wheel-drive Excellence AWD specification. The British model uses the DM-p plug-in hybrid system with a longitudinally mounted 1.5-liter turbocharged engine, a 35.6 kWh Blade battery giving an electric range of up to 74 mi (119 km), and a combined output of 408 PS (300 kW; 402 hp), with the seven-seat layout developed for the European and British markets. The first cars reach showrooms in November 2026, and customer deliveries are scheduled to begin in January 2027.

=== Middle East and Africa ===
==== GCC ====
Al-Futtaim BYD KSA introduced the BYD Ti 7 in Saudi Arabia in May 2026 as the brand's 12th model in the country, powered by the DM-p plug-in hybrid system. In the United Arab Emirates, Al-Futtaim launched the BYD Ti 7 in June 2026 as a four-wheel-drive plug-in hybrid with a combined output of 480 hp (358 kW; 487 PS) and an electric range of 80 km (50 mi).

==== Egypt ====
In Egypt, BYD's exclusive importer ManDream began delivering the BYD Ti 7 in June 2026 in two versions, the front-wheel-drive Ultra producing 275 hp (205 kW; 279 PS) and the all-wheel-drive Luxury producing 485 hp (362 kW; 492 PS).

== Intellectual property dispute ==
In August 2026, bailiffs acting for Jaguar Land Rover (JLR) seized digital records from BYD offices in Schiedam and Hoofddorp in the Netherlands under a court order, as part of a dispute over allegations that the BYD Ti 7 infringes intellectual property rights relating to the Land Rover Defender. The seizure became public in November 2026, and JLR reportedly suspected that BYD had dismantled a Defender to reverse-engineer some of its technology.

On 11 November 2026, a preliminary relief judge in The Hague lifted the seizure and ordered JLR to destroy the seized records, finding that JLR did not need them to pursue its claims because BYD had not sold the BYD Ti 7 in the European Union. The ruling did not address whether the BYD Ti 7 infringes any JLR rights, and JLR's separate claims over design rights and copyright remain pending in summary proceedings in The Hague and Rotterdam. On 20 November 2026 the court in The Hague issued an injunction barring BYD from selling the Ti 7 in the European Union, finding that the characteristic and distinctive elements of the design of the Land Rover Defender were reflected in the BYD Ti 7.

== Sales ==
According to Fangchengbao, the Ti7 passed 200,000 cumulative sales in July 2026, about ten months after its launch, and it reached 300,000 cumulative sales on October 30, 2026.

Year	China
2025	83,584
