= Denza D9 =

Chinese minivan

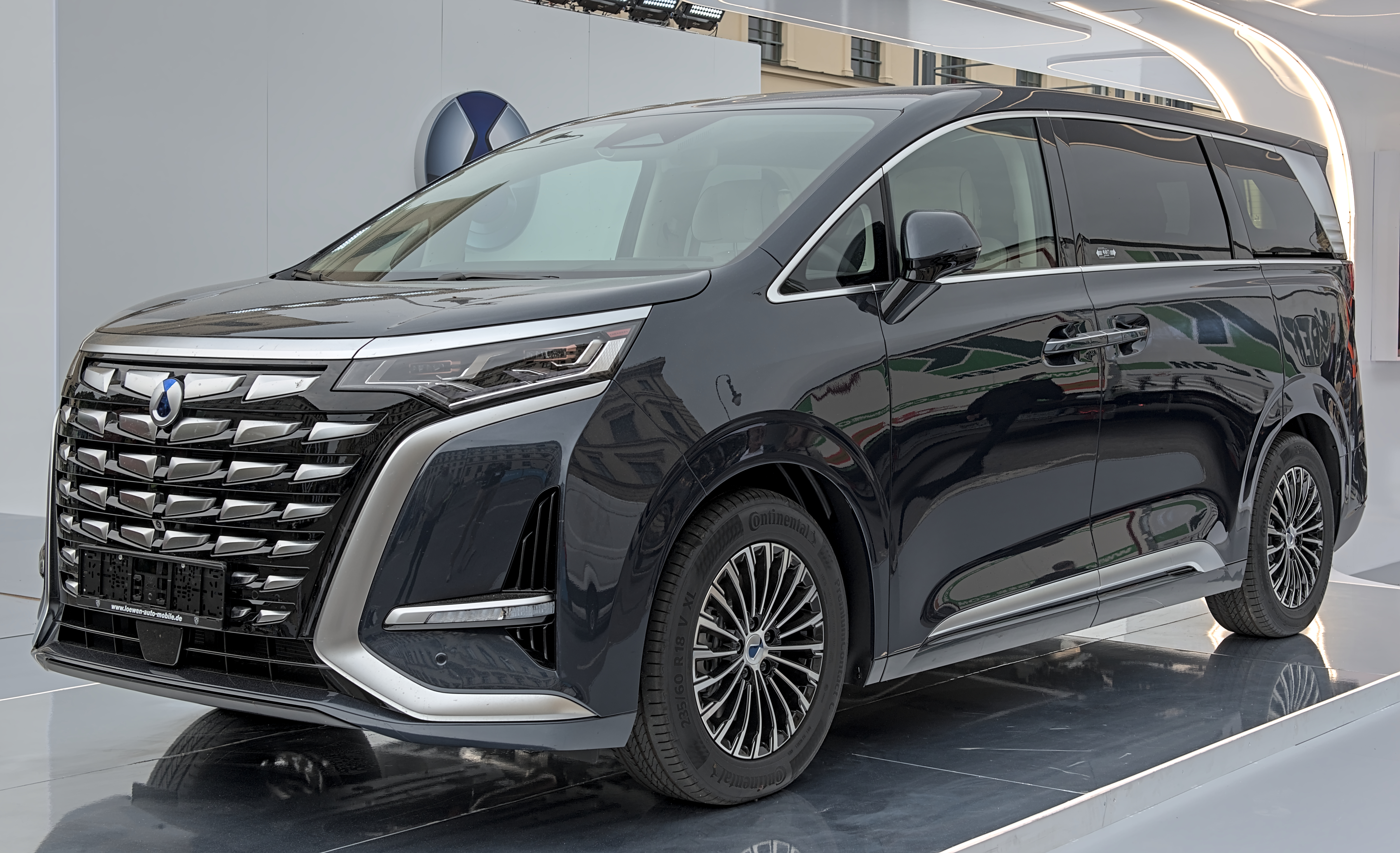
- Denza D9 DM-i

Overview
- Manufacturer: BYD Auto
- Model code: MRH (DM-i); MRE (EV)
- Also called: Danza D9 (Indonesia, October 2026 – present)
- Production: October 2022 – present
- Assembly: China: Xi'an, Shaanxi; Shenzhen, Guangdong; Changsha, Hunan; Indonesia: Subang, West Java (BYD Auto Indonesia)
- Designer: Under the lead of Wolfgang Egger

Body and chassis
- Class: Large minivan
- Body style: 5-door minivan
- Layout: Front-engine, front-motor, front-wheel drive (D9 DM-i); Front-engine, dual-motor, all-wheel drive (D9 DM-i AWD); Front-motor, front-wheel drive (D9 EV); Dual-motor, all-wheel drive (D9 EV AWD)
- Platform: DM-i (D9 DM-i); e-Platform 3.0 (D9 EV); Super e-Platform (D9 EV Facelift)
- Related: BYD Xia

Powertrain
- Engine: Petrol plug-in hybrid: 1.5 L BYD476ZQC turbo I4 (D9 DM-i)
- Electric motor: Permanent magnet synchronous
- Transmission: e-CVT (D9 DM-i)
- Hybrid drivetrain: Plug-in hybrid (D9 DM-i)
- Battery: 20.39 kWh lithium-ion (D9 DM-i); 40.06 kWh lithium-ion (D9 DM-i); 103.36 kWh BYD Blade LFP (D9 EV); 115 kWh BYD Blade 2.0 LFP (D9 EV Facelift)

Dimensions
- Wheelbase: 3,110 mm (122.4 in)
- Length: 5,250 mm (206.7 in)
- Width: 1,960 mm (77.2 in)
- Height: 1,920 mm (75.6 in)
- Curb weight: 2,325 kg (5,126 lb)

The Denza D9 (Chinese: 腾势D9; pinyin: Téngshì D9) is a battery electric and plug-in hybrid minivan produced and manufactured by Chinese brand Denza, a premium marque of BYD Auto. It debuted in May 2022 as the first Denza model after the brand's restructuring. It is built on BYD's e-Platform 3.0 structure for the EV model, and the DM-i platform for the plug-in hybrid model.

== Overview ==
The D9 was introduced on 16 May 2022 in China, after its exterior and interior design, as well its name, were revealed through mid-to-late April 2022. Sales for the Chinese market were commenced on 23 August 2022, with the first units rolling out on 21 October 2022, while deliveries began on 25 October 2022. It is initially offered with seven trim levels, which consist of four trims for the DM-i models, and three trims for the EV models, with trim level names include the Deluxe (DM-i only), Premium and Flagship (all models).

The interior of high end version is equipped with seven infotainment screens featuring three in the front, including a 10.25-inch instrument panel, a 15.6-inch central control screen, and a head-up display. For the second row, two screens are on the front seatbacks, and two are in the second-row armrests. There is also a refrigerator between the front seats, accessible by occupants in the second row. Screen mirroring of Android phones is also offered on the TS Link intelligent interactive cockpit. The second-row captain chairs are 10-way adjustable and come with footrests, heating, ventilating, and a 10-point massage function. Three quick wireless phone chargers are also included.

The D9 made its global debut in March 2023 at the 44th Bangkok International Motor Show in Thailand.

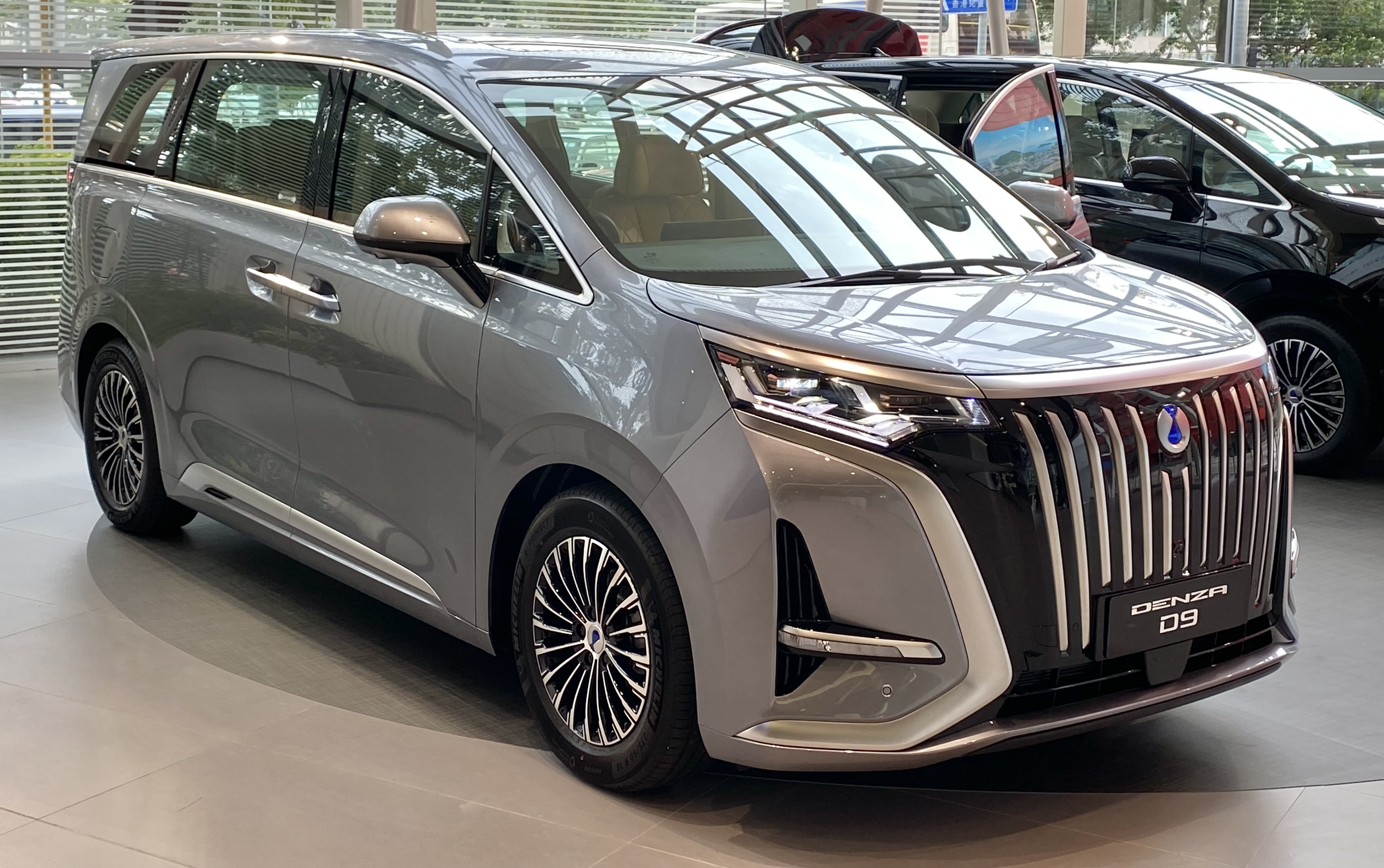
Denza D9 EV

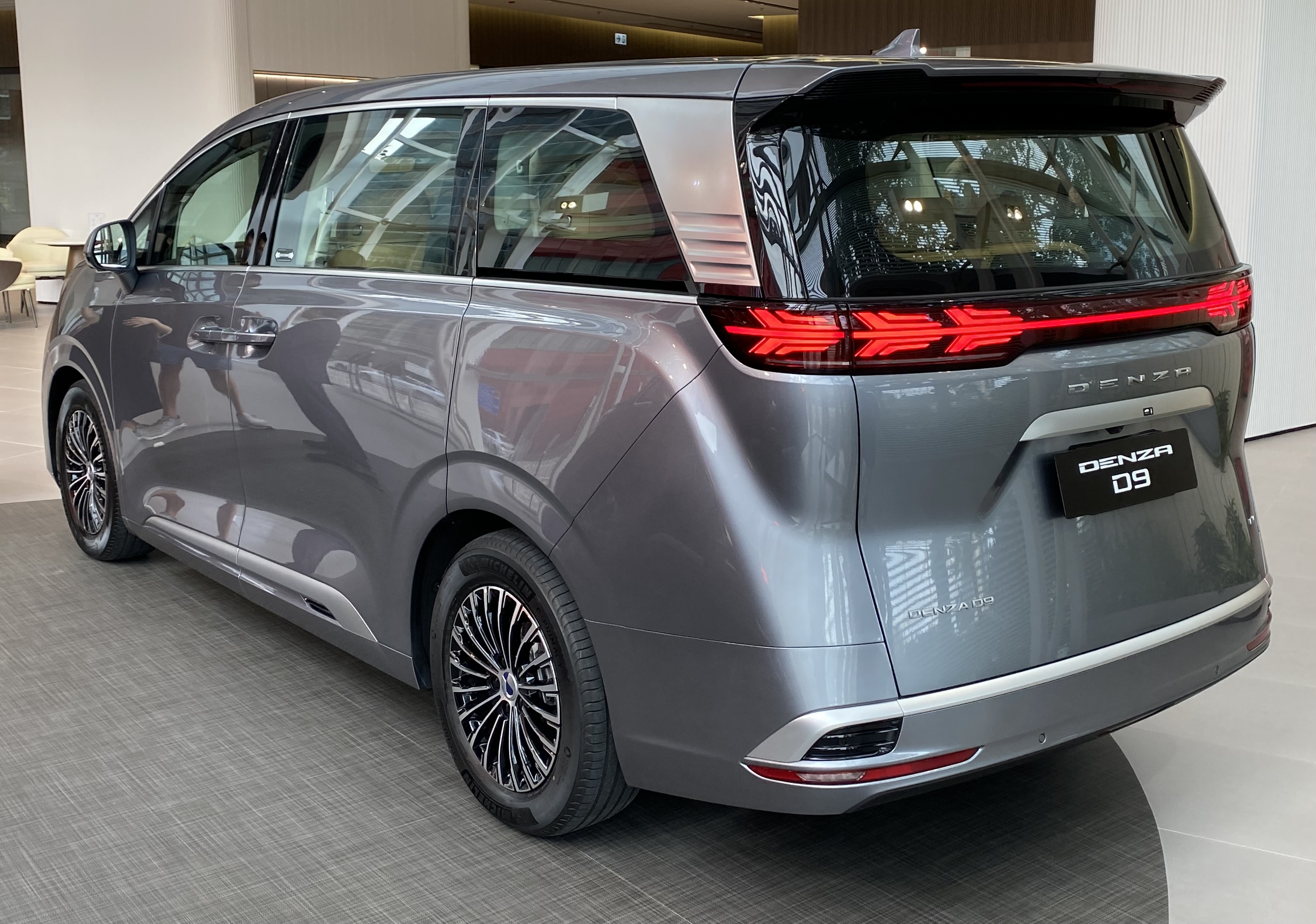
Rear view

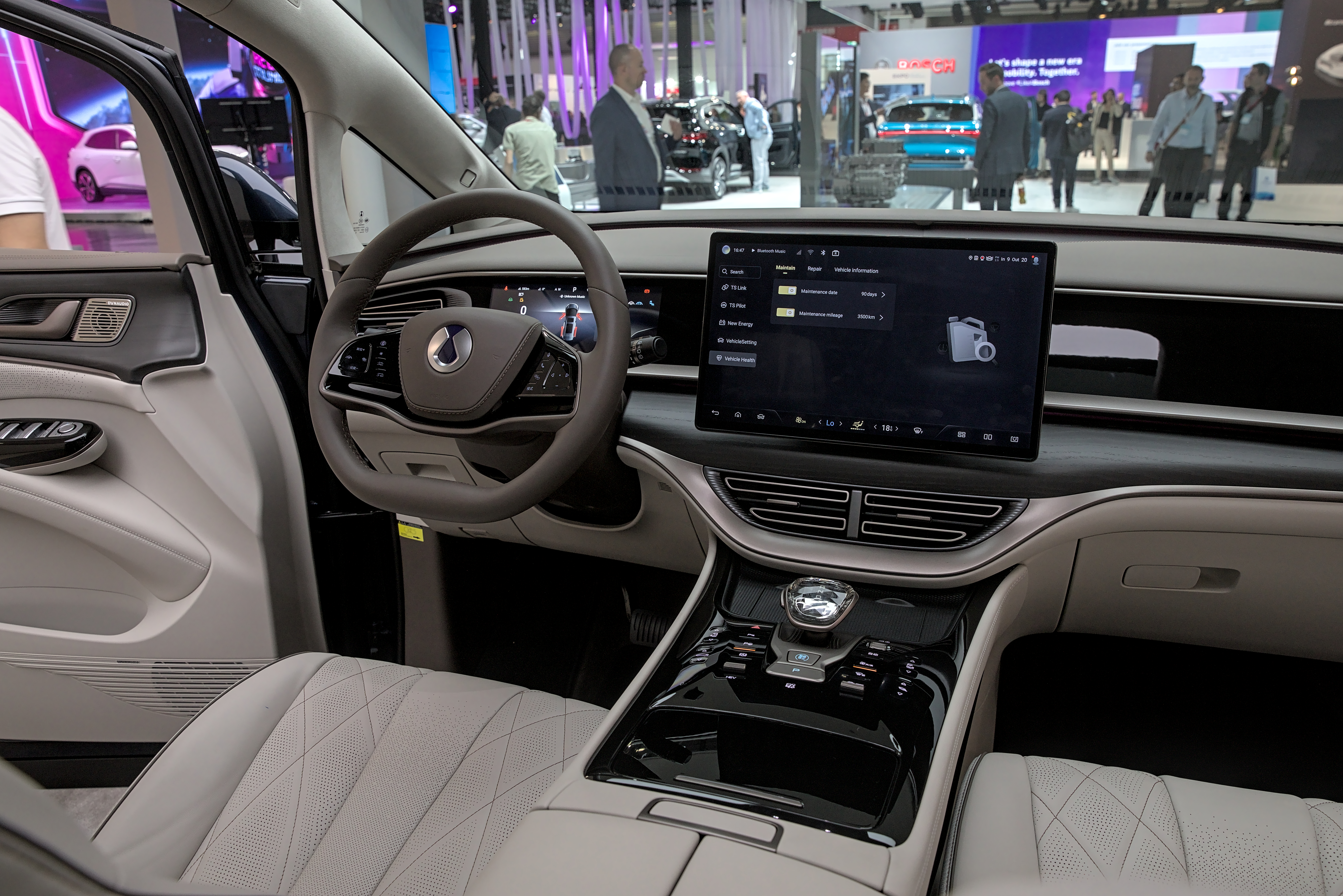
Interior

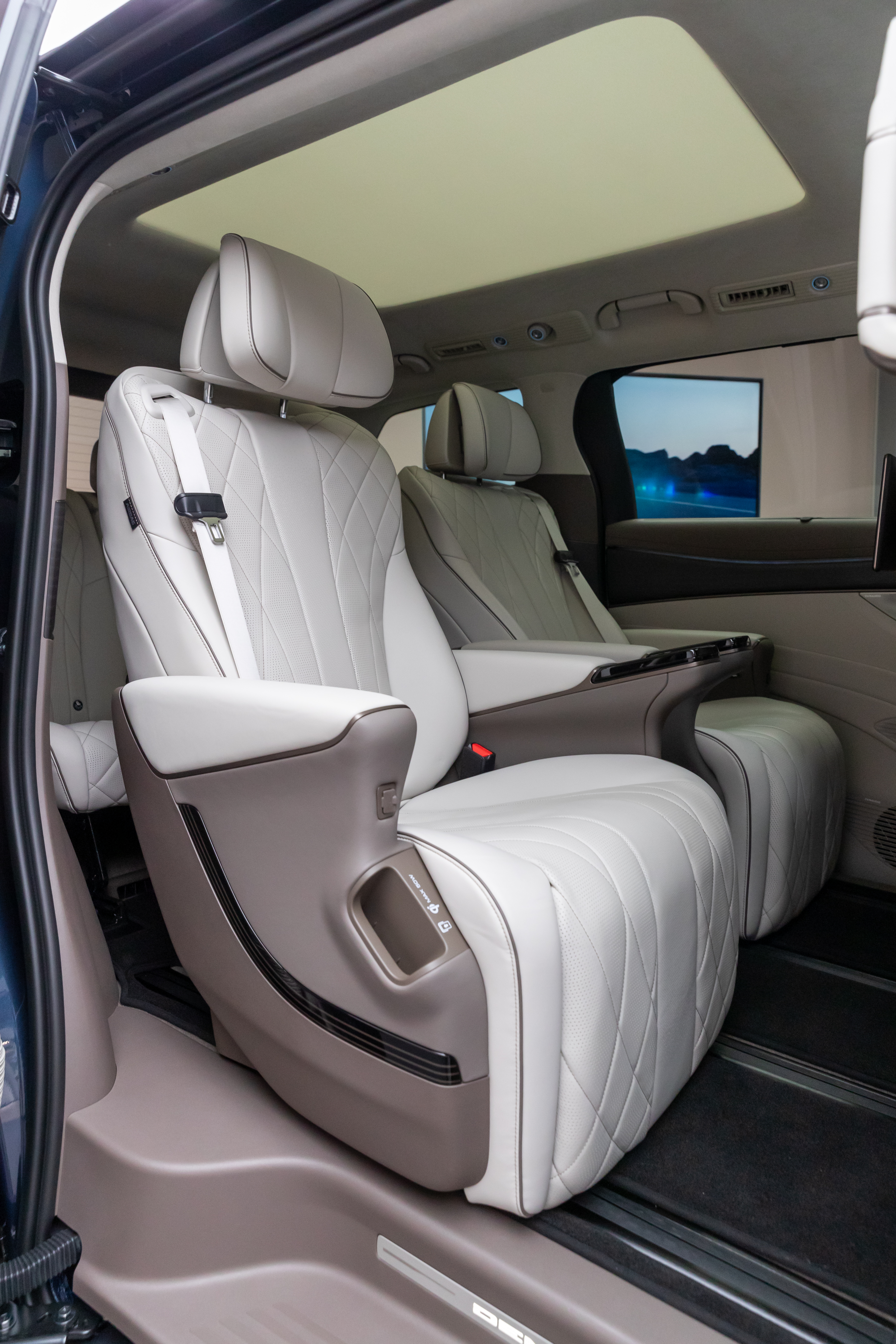
Rear seats

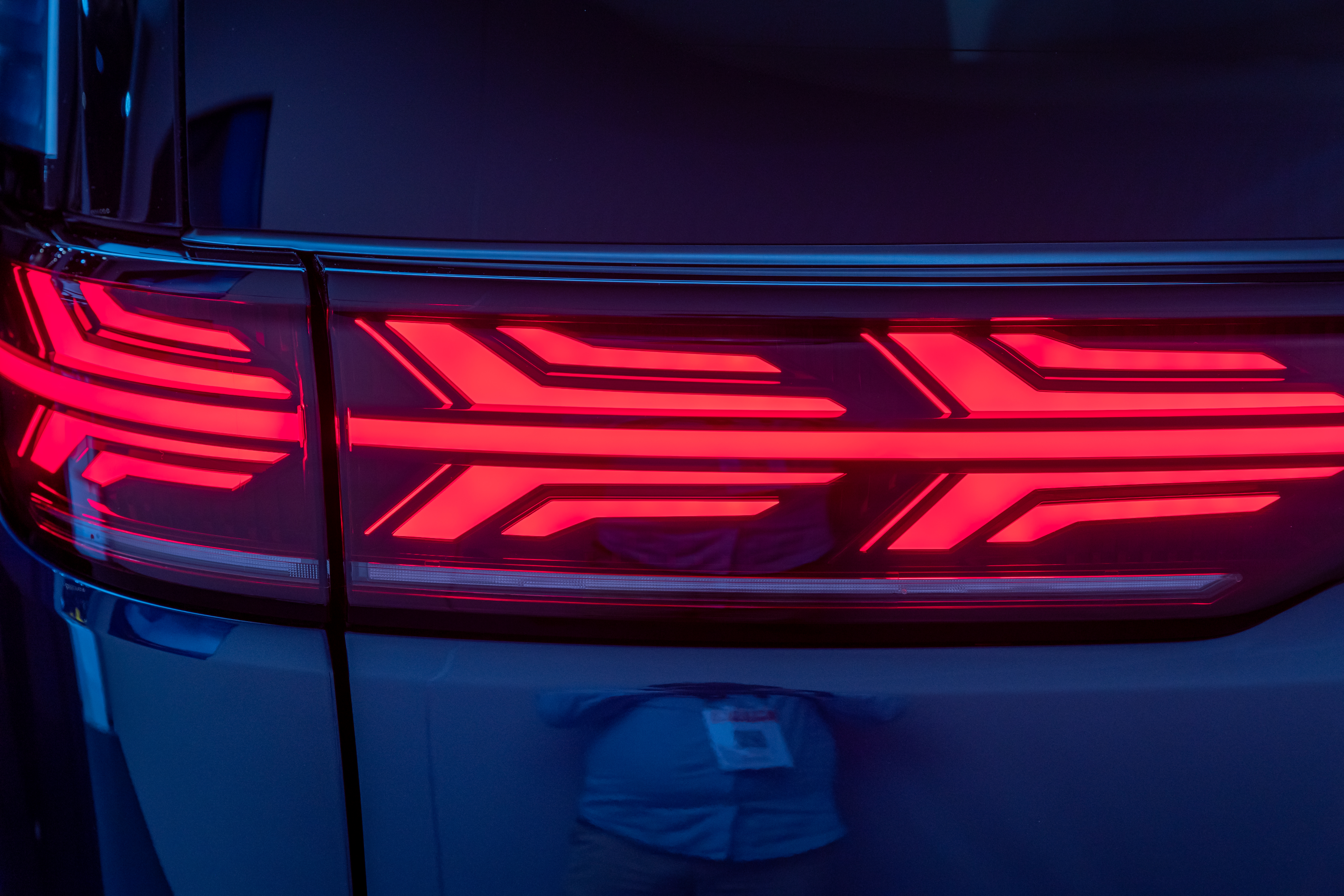
Close-up of the D9 taillight design

=== Model year changes ===
In March 2024, for the 2024 model year, the D9 received its first update. Changes include automatic soft-closing doors as standard, a new beige interior color (marketed as "Kuangdami" (Chinese: 旷达米; pinyin: Kuàngdá Mǐ; lit. 'Broad-minded Rice')), physical steering wheel buttons replacing the touch-sensitive ones, standard heated steering wheel on all trims, additional buttons on the central console, and an on-board refrigerator. Powertrain options were also updated on specific trims.

In December 2024, for the 2025 model year, the D9 received a second update, which saw the DM-i model moves to the fifth-generation DM-i platform and received an updated grille pattern design. All trims were come standard with a LiDAR sensor mounted on the front of the roof on the center, and BYD's "God's Eye" BAS 3.0+ advanced driving assistance system. The Luxury was introduced as a new base trim, replacing the Deluxe trim for the DM-i model and added on the EV model. Powertrain options were also updated on specific trims. Other changes include a Starry Grey exterior color, an additional dashboard screen for the front passenger, 10-screen interconnectivity, second-row zero-gravity seats, power-seat adjustment for the third-row seats, and updated heating and cooling support for the on-board refrigerator.

=== Limited variants ===
==== Denza D9 Premier Founder's Edition (2023) ====
A limited ultra-luxury variant, called the Premier Founder's Edition, was announced at the same time of its initial introduction and unveiled in April 2023 at the 2023 Auto Shanghai. Limited to 99 units and only available in the DM-i model, the Premier Founder's Edition comes with a two-tone exterior paint job and features a 4-seater interior configuration. The finalized production model was revealed in November 2023 at the 2023 Auto Guangzhou, with deliveries started on 4 February 2024.

==== Denza D9 Pioneer (2024) ====
A similar limited variant to the Premier Founder's Edition, albeit without the two-tone exterior paint job, called the Pioneer, was made available briefly after the D9 was updated for the 2024 model year.

== Powertrain ==
=== Denza D9 DM-i ===
The plug-in hybrid models have a driving range between 945 and 1,040 km (587 and 646 mi), with 190 km (118 mi) of pure electric range, and offers up to 80 kW DC fast charging with a fuel consumption of 6.2 l/100 km (16.1 km/l; 37.9 mpg_{‑US}). Power comes from a 1.5-liter turbocharged petrol engine mated with an electric motor in the DM-i EHS170 electric hybrid system and a 3-in-1 rear-drive hybrid assembly.

Type	Engine			Trans.	Battery	Layout	Electric motor			Combined system		0–100 km/h (62 mph) (claimed)	Electric range		Cruising range	Calendar years
Type	Displ.	Power	Torque	Trans.	Battery	Layout	Type	Power	Torque	Power	Torque	0–100 km/h (62 mph) (claimed)	NEDC	WLTC	NEDC	Calendar years
DM-i 965	BYD476ZQC 1,497 cc (1.5 L) I4 turbo	102 kW (137 hp)	231 N⋅m (23.6 kg⋅m; 170 lb⋅ft)	E-CVT	20.39 kWh lithium-ion	FWD	Front PMSM	170 kW (228 hp; 231 PS)	340 N⋅m (251 lb⋅ft)	221 kW (296 hp; 300 PS)	571 N⋅m (421 lb⋅ft)	9.5 seconds	98 km (61 mi)	75 km (47 mi)	965 km (600 mi)	2022–present
DM-i 1040	BYD476ZQC 1,497 cc (1.5 L) I4 turbo	102 kW (137 hp)	231 N⋅m (23.6 kg⋅m; 170 lb⋅ft)	E-CVT	40.06 kWh lithium-ion	FWD	Front PMSM	170 kW (228 hp; 231 PS)	340 N⋅m (251 lb⋅ft)	221 kW (296 hp; 300 PS)	571 N⋅m (421 lb⋅ft)	9.5 seconds	190 km (118 mi)	155 km (96 mi)	1,040 km (646 mi)	2022–present
DM-i 970 AWD	BYD476ZQC 1,497 cc (1.5 L) I4 turbo	102 kW (137 hp)	231 N⋅m (23.6 kg⋅m; 170 lb⋅ft)	E-CVT	40.06 kWh lithium-ion	AWD	Front PMSM	170 kW (228 hp; 231 PS)	340 N⋅m (251 lb⋅ft)	299 kW (401 hp)	681 N⋅m (69.4 kg⋅m; 502 lb⋅ft)	7.9 seconds	180 km (112 mi)	145 km (90 mi)	970 km (603 mi)	2022–present
DM-i 970 AWD	BYD476ZQC 1,497 cc (1.5 L) I4 turbo	102 kW (137 hp)	231 N⋅m (23.6 kg⋅m; 170 lb⋅ft)	E-CVT	40.06 kWh lithium-ion	AWD	Rear PMSM	45 kW (60 hp)	110 N⋅m (11 kg⋅m; 81 lb⋅ft)	299 kW (401 hp)	681 N⋅m (69.4 kg⋅m; 502 lb⋅ft)	7.9 seconds	180 km (112 mi)	145 km (90 mi)	970 km (603 mi)	2022–present

=== Denza D9 EV ===
The driving range for the pure electric version is 620 km (385 mi) and a LFP battery with a capacity of 103 kWh. Maximum DC charging for the EV model is 166 kW. For the Chinese market model, the D9 EV has charging ports on both rear quarter panels, so slower chargers can be combined to achieve the maximum rate.

Type	Battery	Layout	Electric motor		Power	Torque	0–100 km/h (0–62 mph) (claimed)	Range (claimed)			Calendar years
Type	Battery	Layout	Electric motor		Power	Torque	0–100 km/h (0–62 mph) (claimed)	CLTC	NEDC	WLTP	Calendar years
EV 620	103.36 kWh LFP Blade battery	FWD	Front	PMSM	230 kW (308 hp; 313 PS)	360 N⋅m (36.7 kg⋅m; 266 lb⋅ft)	9.5 seconds	620 km (385 mi)	600 km (373 mi)	520 km (323 mi)	2022–present
EV 600	103.36 kWh LFP Blade battery	AWD	Front	PMSM	230 kW (308 hp; 313 PS)	360 N⋅m (36.7 kg⋅m; 266 lb⋅ft)	6.9 seconds	600 km (373 mi)	580 km (360 mi)	480 km (298 mi)	2022–present
EV 600	103.36 kWh LFP Blade battery	AWD	Rear	PMSM	45 kW (60 hp; 61 PS)	110 N⋅m (11 kg⋅m; 81 lb⋅ft)	6.9 seconds	600 km (373 mi)	580 km (360 mi)	480 km (298 mi)	2022–present
EV 600	103.36 kWh LFP Blade battery	AWD	Combined:		275 kW (369 hp; 374 PS)	470 N⋅m (47.9 kg⋅m; 347 lb⋅ft)	6.9 seconds	600 km (373 mi)	580 km (360 mi)	480 km (298 mi)	2022–present

2026 Version

Type	Battery	Layout	Electric motor		Power	Torque	0–100 km/h (0–62 mph) (claimed)	Range (claimed)			Calendar years
Type	Battery	Layout	Electric motor		Power	Torque	0–100 km/h (0–62 mph) (claimed)	CLTC	NEDC	WLTP	Calendar years
EV Extended	115 kWh LFP Blade 2.0	FWD	Front	PMSM	340 kW (456 hp; 462 PS)	365 N⋅m (37.2 kg⋅m; 269 lb⋅ft)	8.5 seconds	800 km (497 mi)	730 km (454 mi)		2026–present
EV Performance AWD	115 kWh LFP Blade 2.0	AWD	Front	PMSM	340 kW (456 hp; 462 PS)	365 N⋅m (37.2 kg⋅m; 269 lb⋅ft)	7.3 seconds	750 km (466 mi)	650 km (404 mi)		2026–present
EV Performance AWD	115 kWh LFP Blade 2.0	AWD	Rear	PMSM	70 kW (94 hp; 95 PS)	80 N⋅m (8.2 kg⋅m; 59 lb⋅ft)	7.3 seconds	750 km (466 mi)	650 km (404 mi)		2026–present
EV Performance AWD	115 kWh LFP Blade 2.0	AWD	Combined:		410 kW (550 hp; 557 PS)	445 N⋅m (45.4 kg⋅m; 328 lb⋅ft)	7.3 seconds	750 km (466 mi)	650 km (404 mi)		2026–present

== Export markets ==
=== Hong Kong ===
The D9 was introduced in Hong Kong on 24 June 2024, while also debuting the right-hand drive version for the first time. Hong Kong is the first right-hand drive market to receive the model, as well as Denza's first overseas operations. Only available as an EV model, it is available with front-wheel drive and all-wheel drive layouts.

=== Oceania ===
==== Australia ====
The D9 went on sale in Australia on 2 March 2026, as the third Denza model to be marketed in the country. Imported from China and only available as the EV model, it is available in FWD and AWD variants.

=== Southeast Asia ===
==== Brunei ====
The D9 has been launched in Brunei alongside the B5 and the entry of the Denza brand in the country on 13 January 2026. Imported from China, it is only available in the sole EV variant with all-wheel drive.

==== Cambodia ====
Cambodia becomes the first ASEAN country to receive the D9, alongside the Denza brand, with deliveries began on 14 July 2024.

==== Indonesia ====
The D9 was the first Denza model to be marketed in Indonesia, which was launched in the country alongside the Denza brand on 22 January 2025. A Chinese left-hand drive model was previously showcased in the country through select public outings in 2024, such as the 31st Indonesia International Motor Show where it was initially debuted. Imported from China, it is available in the sole unnamed EV variant with front-wheel drive drivetrain.

On 1 October 2026, the D9 was rebranded to Danza D9, following the renaming of the Denza brand to Danza in the country that was caused by trademark dispute.

The locally assembled CKD D9 was launched on 14 October 2026 along with the Z9 GT, and introduced the BYD's Flash Charging technology. Manufactured in BYD's Subang Plant. The CKD model D9 received a new second generation Blade Battery, longer electric range (730 km (454 mi), and the power output of the electric motor was increased to 456 hp (462 PS; 340 kW). The centre console was also redesigned.

==== Malaysia ====
The D9 was the first Denza model to be marketed in Malaysia, which was launched in the country alongside the Denza brand on 20 February 2025. Imported from China and only available as the EV model, the Malaysian market D9 is offered with two variants: Advanced with front-wheel drive, and Premium with all-wheel drive.

==== Philippines ====
The D9 was the first Denza model to be marketed in the Philippines, which was launched in the country alongside the Denza brand on 27 February 2026. Imported from China, it is available in the sole DM-i variant using the 40.06 kWh battery pack with all-wheel drive.

==== Singapore ====
After being previewed by the Chinese left-hand drive model in January 2024, the D9 was launched for the Singaporean market on 10 October 2024. Imported from China and only available as the EV model, it is offered with two variants: Elite with front-wheel drive, and Grandeur with all-wheel drive.

==== Thailand ====
The D9 was the first Denza vehicle to be sold in Thailand. It was launched on 1 November 2024. Imported from China and only available as the EV model, the Thai market D9 is offered with two variants: Premium with front-wheel drive, and Performance with all-wheel drive.

The D9 was upgraded on 3 November 2026, with Flash Charging 1,500 kW, it is offered with two variants: Extended with front-wheel drive, and Performance with all-wheel drive.

==== India ====
In November 2026, BYD's luxury sub-brand Denza entered the Indian market with the launch of the all-electric Denza D9 MPV, priced at ₹90 lakh (ex-showroom) as a single, fully imported variant alongside the Denza Z9 GT. Equipped with a 115.07 kWh BYD Blade battery pack and a 462 hp front-wheel-drive electric motor, the India-spec D9 delivers a claimed NEDC range of 730 km and 0-100 km/h acceleration in 8.5 seconds.

== Sales ==
Shortly after its initial introduction, the D9 received 3,000 pre-orders within 30 minutes. Within 24 hours at the day of its announcement, a total of 5,679 pre-orders were received. By July 2022, pre-orders were exceeded to 30,000 orders within two months since its introduction. As of November 2023, sales of the D9 have surpassed to 100,000 units.

On 24 September 2023, the 100,000th D9, a dark blue DM-i model, was produced and rolled out from the production line in a 11-month gap. On 10 June 2025, the 250,000th D9 rolled off the production line, which Denza claims is the world's first NEV MPV to achieve the statistic.

Year	China			Thailand	Indonesia	Malaysia (Note: Figures based on registration (Malaysia))
Year	D9 DM-i	D9 EV	Total	D9 EV	D9 EV	D9 EV
2022	9,803	—	9,803	—	—	—
2023	111,560	7,035	118,595	—	—	—
2024	97,948	4,862	102,810	—	—	—
2025	82,101	7,263	89,364	3,096	7,474	1,200
