= BYD Song L DM-i =

Mid-size crossover SUV

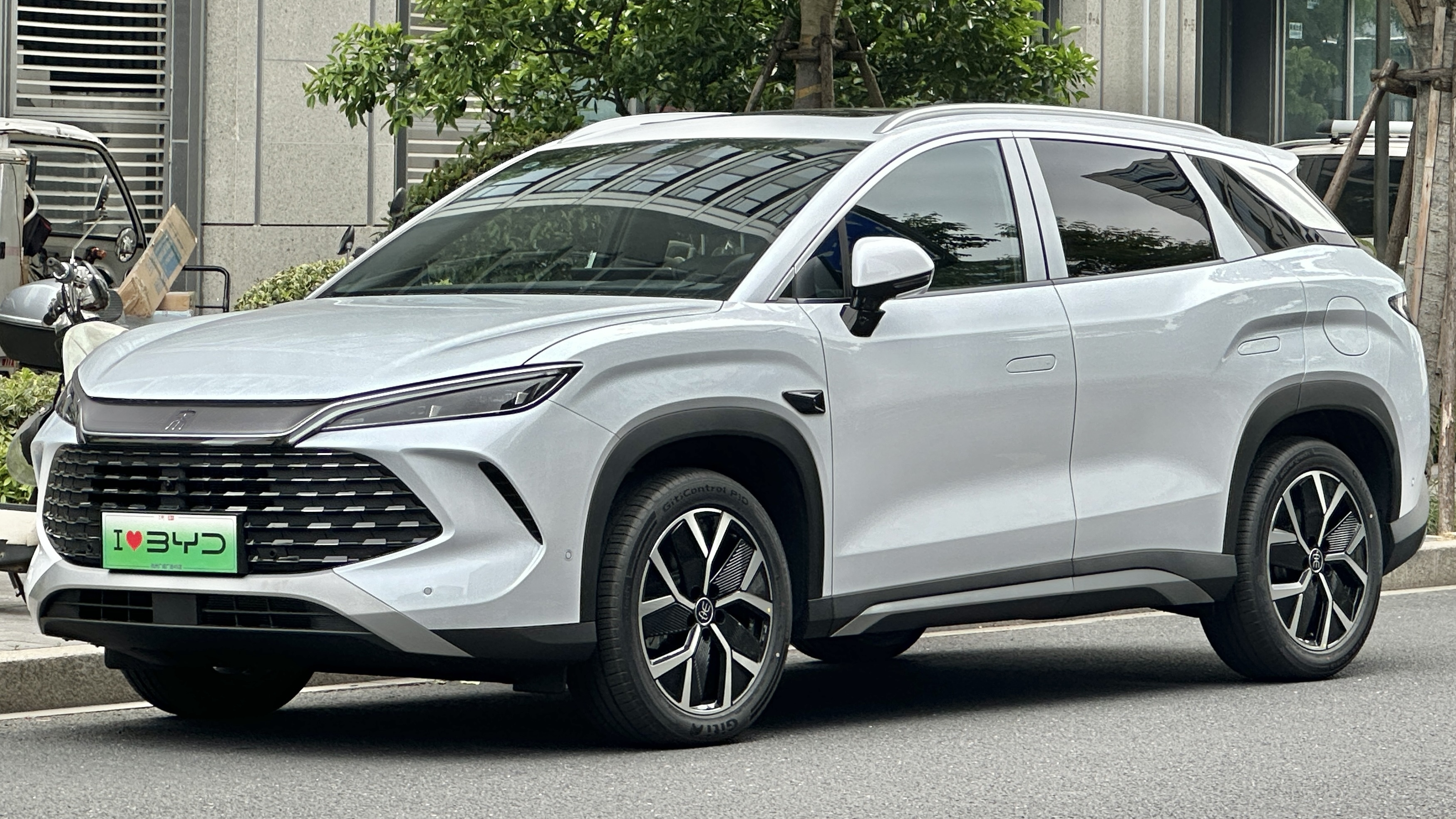

Overview
- Manufacturer: BYD Auto
- Production: June 2024 – present
- Assembly: China: Zhengzhou, Henan; Changsha, Hunan
- Designer: Under the lead of Wolfgang Egger

Body and chassis
- Class: Mid-size SUV
- Body style: 5-door crossover SUV
- Layout: Front-engine, front-motor, front-wheel drive
- Platform: DM-i 5.0 platform
- Related: BYD Song Ultra; BYD Song Plus / Seal U / Sealion 6

Powertrain
- Engine: Petrol plug-in hybrid: 1.5 L BYD472QC I4 Atkinson cycle
- Electric motor: Permanent magnet synchronous
- Transmission: E-CVT
- Hybrid drivetrain: Plug-in hybrid
- Battery: 12.9 kWh BYD Blade LFP; 18.3 kWh BYD Blade LFP; 26.6 kWh BYD Blade LFP

Dimensions
- Wheelbase: 2,782 mm (109.5 in)
- Length: 4,780 mm (188.2 in)
- Width: 1,898 mm (74.7 in)
- Height: 1,670 mm (65.7 in)
- Curb weight: 1,930–2,000 kg (4,255–4,409 lb)

The BYD Song L DM-i (Chinese: 比亚迪宋L DM-i) is a plug-in hybrid mid-size SUV manufactured by BYD Auto since 2024. It is part of the Song line-up of SUVs under the Dynasty Series product line-up that are distributed through Dynasty Network dealerships. Within that series, it is positioned between the smaller Song Pro and the larger Tang DM-i.

While the vehicle shares the same name with the BYD Song L EV, both models have minimal relation in styling and mechanical components. Instead, the model is positioned identically with the BYD Song Plus from the Ocean Network dealerships, which adopts the same plug-in hybrid system.

== Overview ==
The Song L DM-i went on sale in the Chinese market in July 2024, alongside the updated Song Plus. It is equipped with BYD's fifth-generation plug-in hybrid system marketed as DM-i 5.0. This system debuted with the BYD Qin L and BYD Seal 06 DM-i.

The exterior of the Song L DM-i inspired from the "Pioneer Dragon Face Aesthetics" style, characterised by elements such as "dragon teeth" and "dragon whiskers" on the front fascia. The side features flushed door handles, frameless doors and the pillars finished in a chrome decoration. The rear fascia features a full-width LED taillight bar with a Chinese knot style and two-section active rear spoiler.

The interior features a "2+1+1" multi-screen system with a 10.25-inch digital instrument panel for the driver, a 15.6-inch rotatable touchscreen infotainment system (built-in DiLink 100 operating system and a 6 nm processor chip), a 50-inch heads-up display and a 5.8-inch HVAC control screen for the rear occupants. In addition, there is a 10-speaker Infinity sound system, 50W wireless charging pad, and a heated steering wheel. The boot space stands at 459 L (16.2 cu ft) and expands to 1,550 L (55 cu ft) when rear seats are folded down.

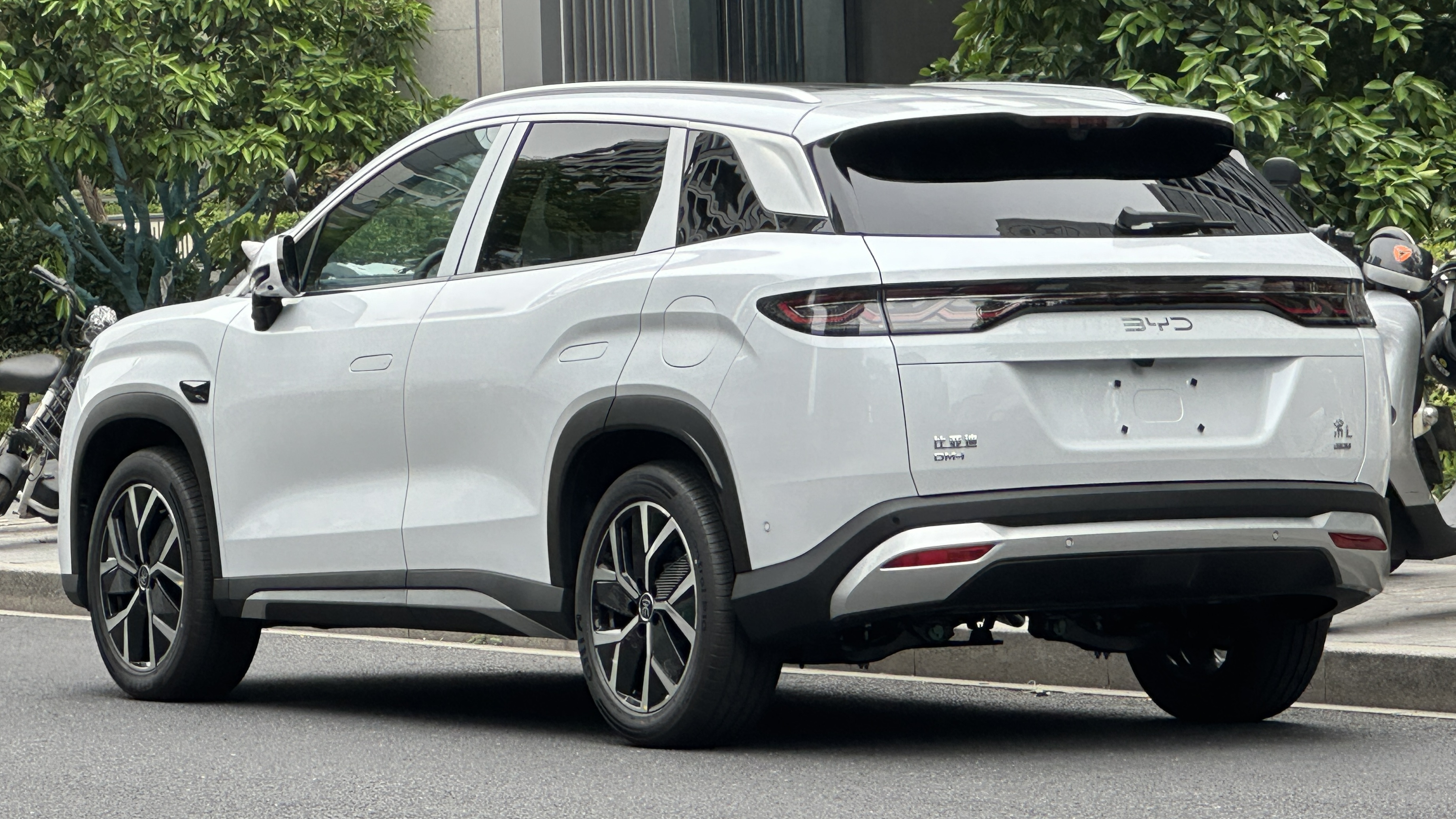
Rear view

== Powertrain ==
Type	Engine			Trans.	Battery	Layout	Electric motor			0–100 km/h (0–62 mph) (claimed)	Electric range (claimed)		Calendar years
Type	Displ.	Power	Torque	Trans.	Battery	Layout	Type	Power	Torque	0–100 km/h (0–62 mph) (claimed)	CLTC	WLTC	Calendar years
1.5L 75 km DM-i	BYD476QC 1,498 cc (1.5 L) I4	74 kW (99 hp)	126 N⋅m (12.8 kg⋅m; 92.9 lb⋅ft)	E-CVT	12.9 kWh LFP Blade	FWD	TZ210XYC PMSM	160 kW (215 hp)	260 N⋅m (26.5 kg⋅m; 192 lb⋅ft)	7.7 seconds	75 km (47 mi)	N/A	2024–present
1.5L 112 km DM-i	BYD476QC 1,498 cc (1.5 L) I4	74 kW (99 hp)	126 N⋅m (12.8 kg⋅m; 92.9 lb⋅ft)	E-CVT	18.3 kWh LFP Blade	FWD	TZ210XYC PMSM	160 kW (215 hp)	260 N⋅m (26.5 kg⋅m; 192 lb⋅ft)	7.7 seconds	112 km (70 mi)	91 km (57 mi)	2024–present
1.5L 160 km DM-i	BYD476QC 1,498 cc (1.5 L) I4	74 kW (99 hp)	126 N⋅m (12.8 kg⋅m; 92.9 lb⋅ft)	E-CVT	26.6 kWh LFP Blade	FWD	TZ210XYC PMSM	160 kW (215 hp)	260 N⋅m (26.5 kg⋅m; 192 lb⋅ft)	7.9 seconds	160 km (99 mi)	128 km (80 mi)	2024–present

== Sales ==
Year	China
2024	109,194
2025	137,120

== See also ==
- List of BYD Auto vehicles
