= BYD Song Ultra =

Battery electric mid-size crossover SUV

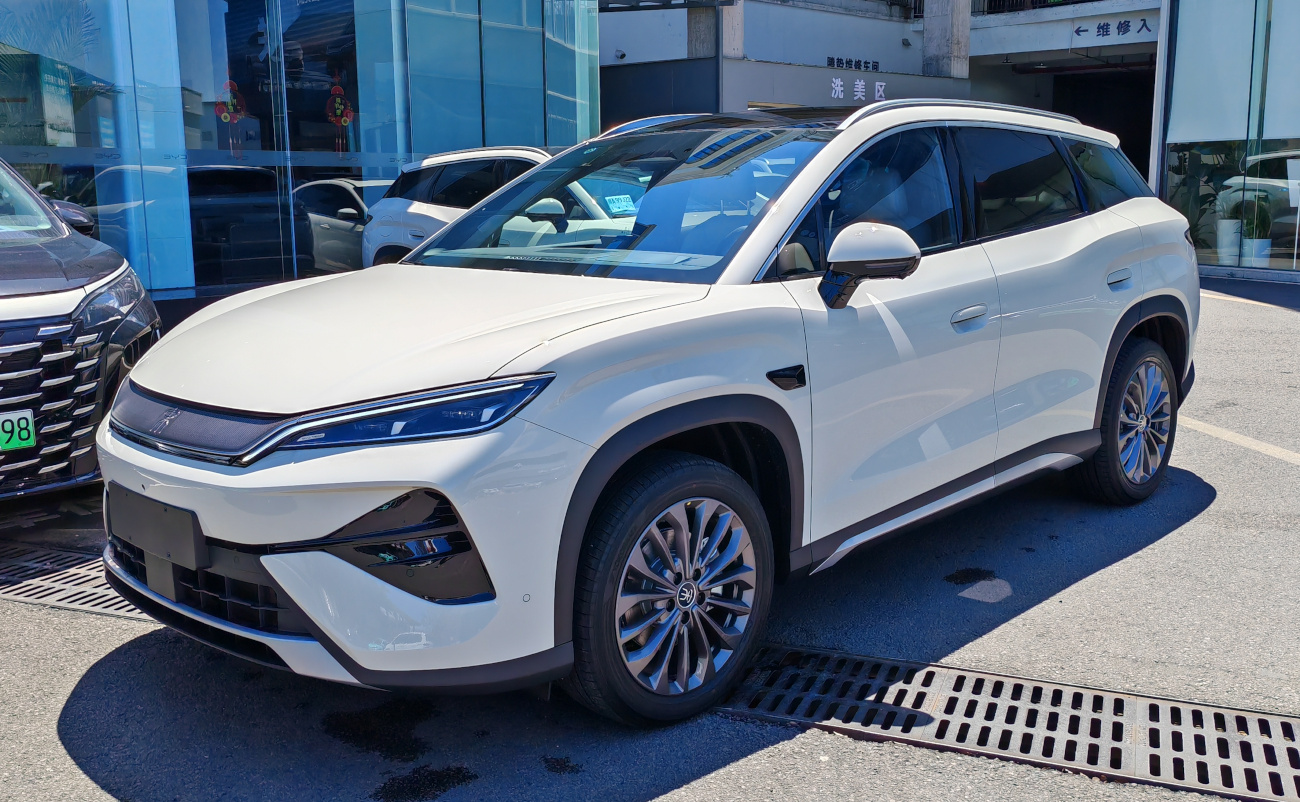

Overview
- Manufacturer: BYD Auto
- Model code: SA5H (DM-i); SA5E (EV)
- Production: 2026–present
- Assembly: China: Zhengzhou, Henan; Changsha, Hunan
- Designer: Under the lead of Wolfgang Egger

Body and chassis
- Class: Mid-size SUV (D-segment)
- Body style: 5-door crossover SUV
- Layout: Rear-motor, rear-wheel-drive
- Platform: e-Platform 3.0
- Related: BYD Song L DM-i; BYD Sealion 06

Powertrain
- Electric motor: TZ200XYAV permanent-magnet synchronous motor
- Power output: 362 hp (270 kW; 367 PS)
- Battery: 75.6 kWh BYD Blade LFP; 82.7 kWh BYD Blade LFP
- Range: 620–710 km (385–441 mi) (CLTC)

Dimensions
- Wheelbase: 2,840 mm (111.8 in)
- Length: 4,850 mm (190.9 in)
- Width: 1,910 mm (75.2 in)
- Height: 1,670 mm (65.7 in)
- Curb weight: 1,990–2,050 kg (4,387–4,519 lb)

The BYD Song Ultra (Chinese: 比亚迪宋Ultra) is a mid-size SUV produced by BYD Auto. It is available with battery electric (EV) and plug-in hybrid (DM-i) powertrains.

== History ==
The Song Ultra was first confirmed via Weibo on February 4, 2026. Photos of the Song Ultra were unveiled on February 15, 2026. Production will take place at the Zhengzhou and Changsha facilities. The Song Ultra was officially unveiled during BYD's Technology Day alongside the Datang on March 5, 2026. Pre-sales began on the same day. It will officially launch at the end of March 26, 2026.

== Design and equipment ==
The Song Ultra uses a closed front end combined with a full light strip, the latter of which is also utilized at the rear. The front end uses BYD's signature Dragon Whisker headlights. The intakes on both the front and end use a claw-style design.

The Song Ultra was one of the first Song model to come with LiDAR capability. Its LiDAR supports the company's God's Eye B system utilizing a 300 TOPS computing platform. A 15.6-inch rotating central screen and a 10.25-inch LCD instrument cluster are utilized. The center console has two 50W wireless phone chargers.

It is one of the first BYD model to support the Flash Charging 1,500 kW DC fast charging technology, supporting charging from 10% to 70% in 5 minutes, rivaling gas-powered vehicles in charge time.

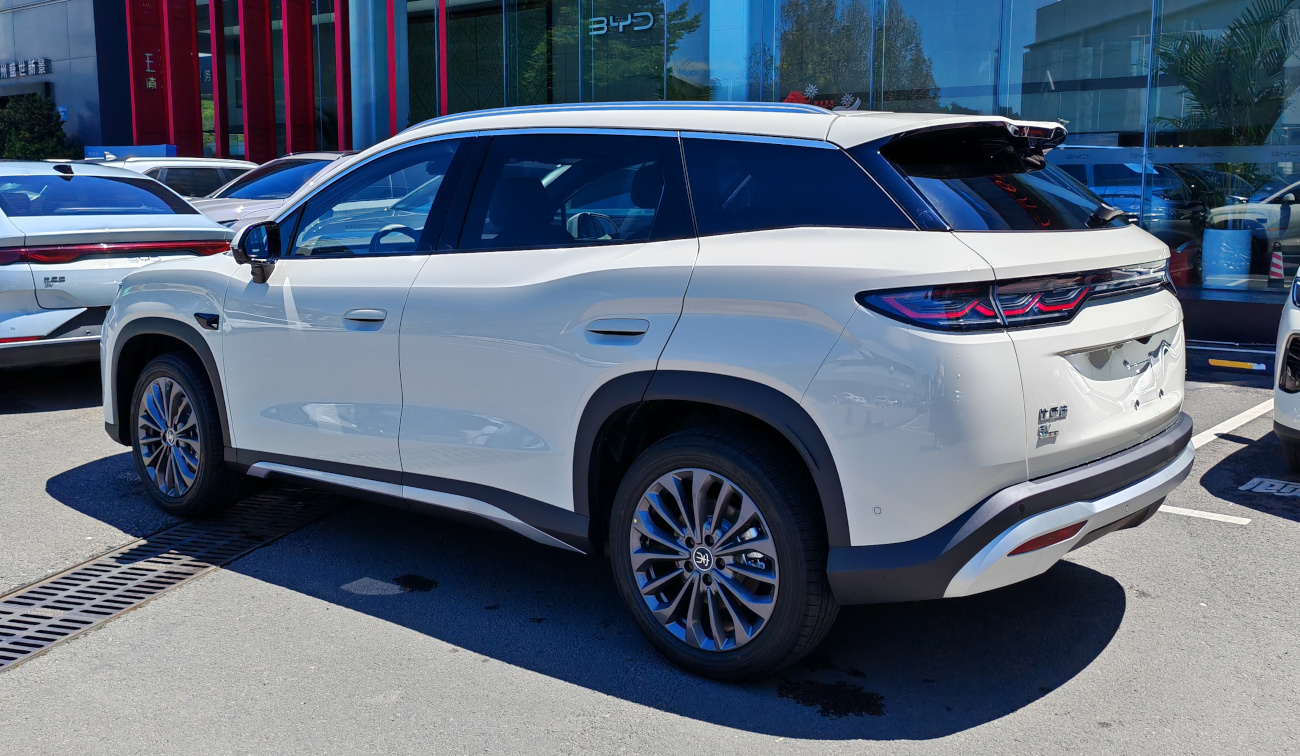
Rear view

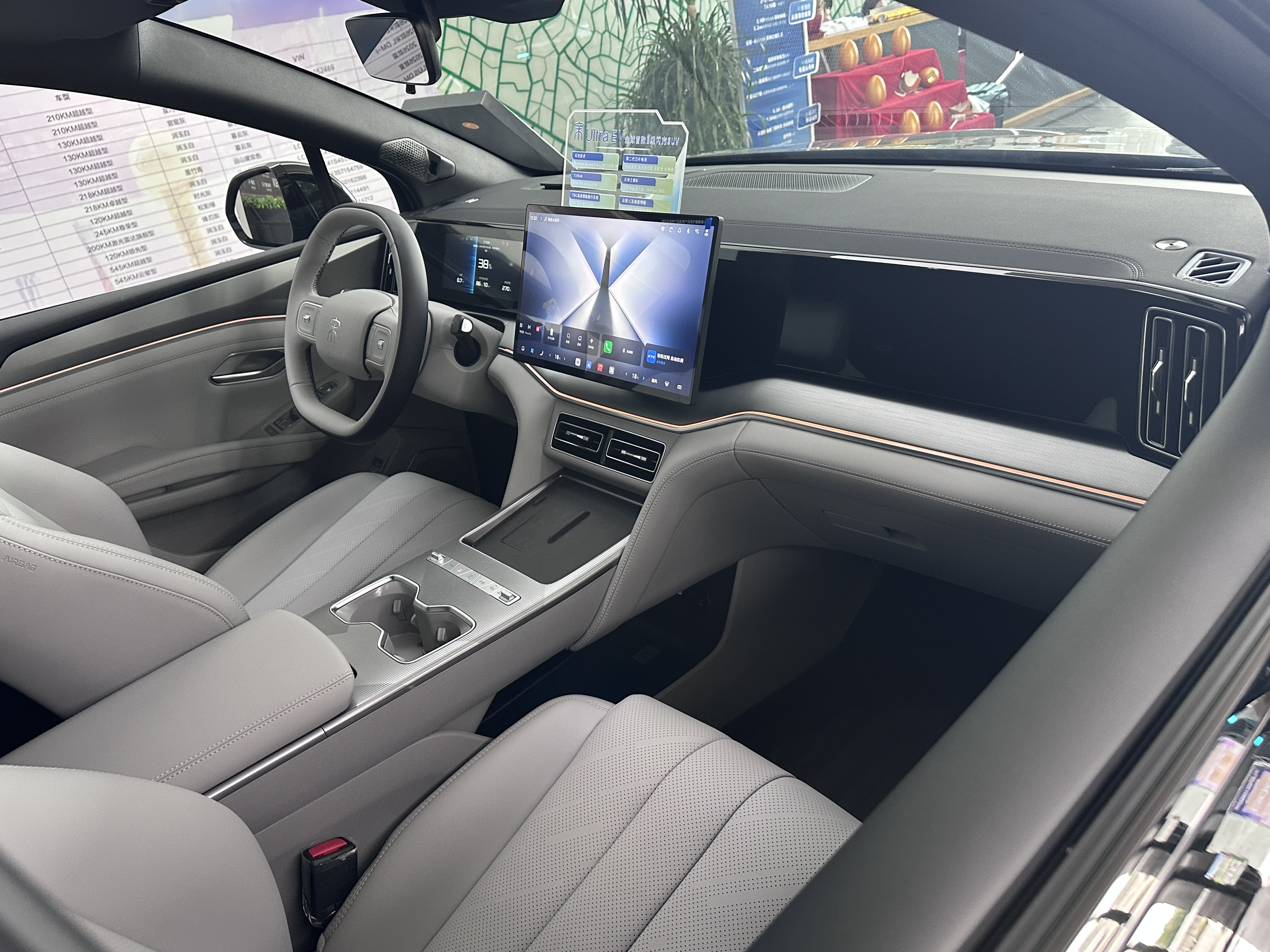
Interior

== Powertrain ==
The Song Ultra is exclusively rear-wheel-drive and produces 362 horsepower. Its range is either 620 km (385 mi) or 710 km (441 mi) (under CLTC standards) depending on the size of the battery. The 75.6 and 82.7 kWh LFP batteries provide the respective range figures. Both batteries are second-generation Blade Battery.

== See also ==
- List of BYD Auto vehicles
