= Fangchengbao Tai 3 =

Battery electric compact crossover SUV

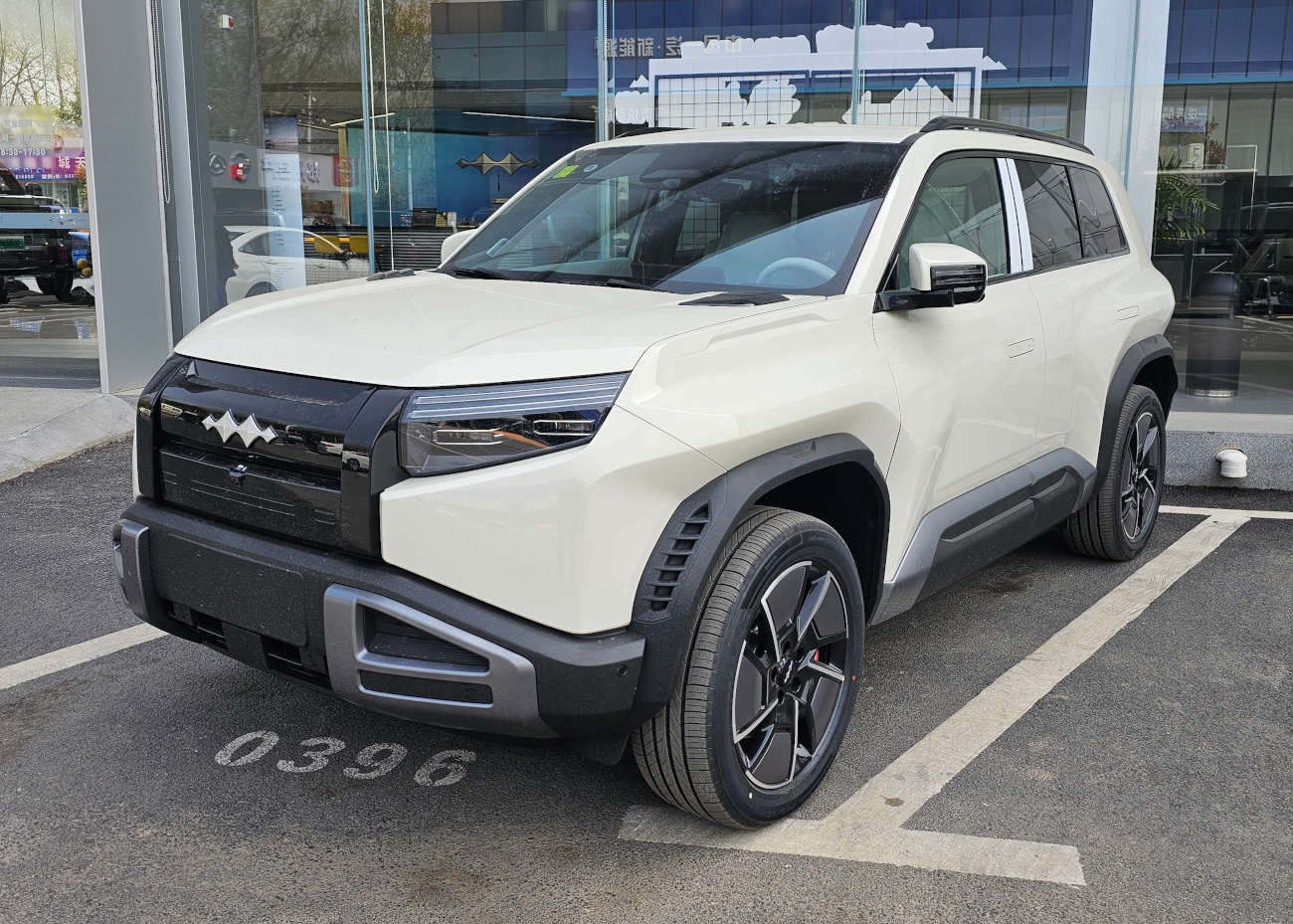

Overview
- Manufacturer: BYD Auto
- Also called: Denza B3 (export)
- Production: March 2025 – present
- Assembly: China: Xi'an, Shaanxi; Changzhou, Jiangsu
- Designer: Under the lead of Wolfgang Egger

Body and chassis
- Class: Compact crossover SUV (C)
- Body style: 5-door SUV
- Layout: Rear-motor, rear-wheel-drive; Dual-motor, all-wheel-drive
- Platform: Evo+ platform
- Chassis: Unibody
- Related: Fangchengbao Ti7

Powertrain
- Electric motor: Permanent magnet synchronous
- Power output: 160 kW (215 hp; 218 PS) (RWD); 310 kW (416 hp; 421 PS) (4WD)
- Battery: 65.28 kWh BYD Blade LFP; 72.96 kWh BYD Blade LFP; 78.72 kWh BYD Blade LFP
- Electric range: 501 km (311 mi) (CLTC)
- Plug-in charging: 195–237 kW (DC)

Dimensions
- Wheelbase: 2,745 mm (108.1 in)
- Length: 4,605 mm (181.3 in)
- Width: 1,900 mm (74.8 in)
- Height: 1,720 mm (67.7 in); 1,930 mm (76.0 in) (drone version)
- Curb weight: 1,995–2,265 kg (4,398–4,993 lb)

The Fangchengbao Tai 3 (Chinese: 方程豹 钛3; lit. 'Formula leopard Titanium 3') is a battery electric compact crossover SUV manufactured by BYD Auto under the Fangchengbao brand. First announced in 2024, the model went on sale in April 2025. It is the first battery electric vehicle from Fangchengbao, and the first model from the "Tai/Ti" (Chinese: 钛; lit. 'Titanium') product line from the brand, as the brand's previous models are plug-in hybrid vehicles from the "Bao" (Chinese: 豹; lit. 'Leopard') line.

== Overview ==
At the Beijing Auto Show in April 2024, BYD revealed the Tai 3's design by introducing the Fangchengbao Super 3 concept car. The production version was announced by a set of images, labeled as "No. 3". Pre-orders were opened on 31 March 2025.

The Tai 3 is available in five variants, two of which are rear-wheel drive (RWD) models and three are four-wheel drive (4WD) versions. The two RWD models are called Pro and Max, with the latter having luxury features such as front seat heating, 50 W wireless charging, double-glazed windows, and 15.6 in (40 cm) infotainment display (12.8 in or 33 cm for the Pro version), rain-sensing wipers, and automatic glare-dimming rearview mirror (manual in the Pro version). The 4WD models are called Max and Ultra, with the latter having DiSUS-C proactively adaptive suspension, beverage refrigerator/heater, automatic front trunk lock and additional stereo speakers (14 vs. 8).

The fifth version is a 4WD Ultra with a roof rack-mounted drone system from DJI named Lingyuan (灵鸢, lit. "clever kite"), which consists of a box hangar that enables dynamic and automatic vertical take-off and landing, fast charging, and AI-assisted photography for a DJI Air 3S drone. The interior also includes a 12-inch head-up display, a refrigerator with adjustable temperatures (-6 °C to 6 °C and 35 °C to 50 °C), Devialet audio, and a karaoke microphone. It comes standard with BYD's advanced driver assistance system marketed as God's Eye C and DiPilot 100, which includes high-speed navigation, automatic parking, and active obstacle avoidance.

An iTAC intelligent torque control system adjusts torque distribution between the front and rear axles, while the iATS intelligent all-terrain recognition system automatically adjusts driving modes for different terrains, including snow, sand, mud and mountains. The two 4WD models also have four additional specialty driving modes for rear-locked turning, ultra-slow, bog-downs and drifting.

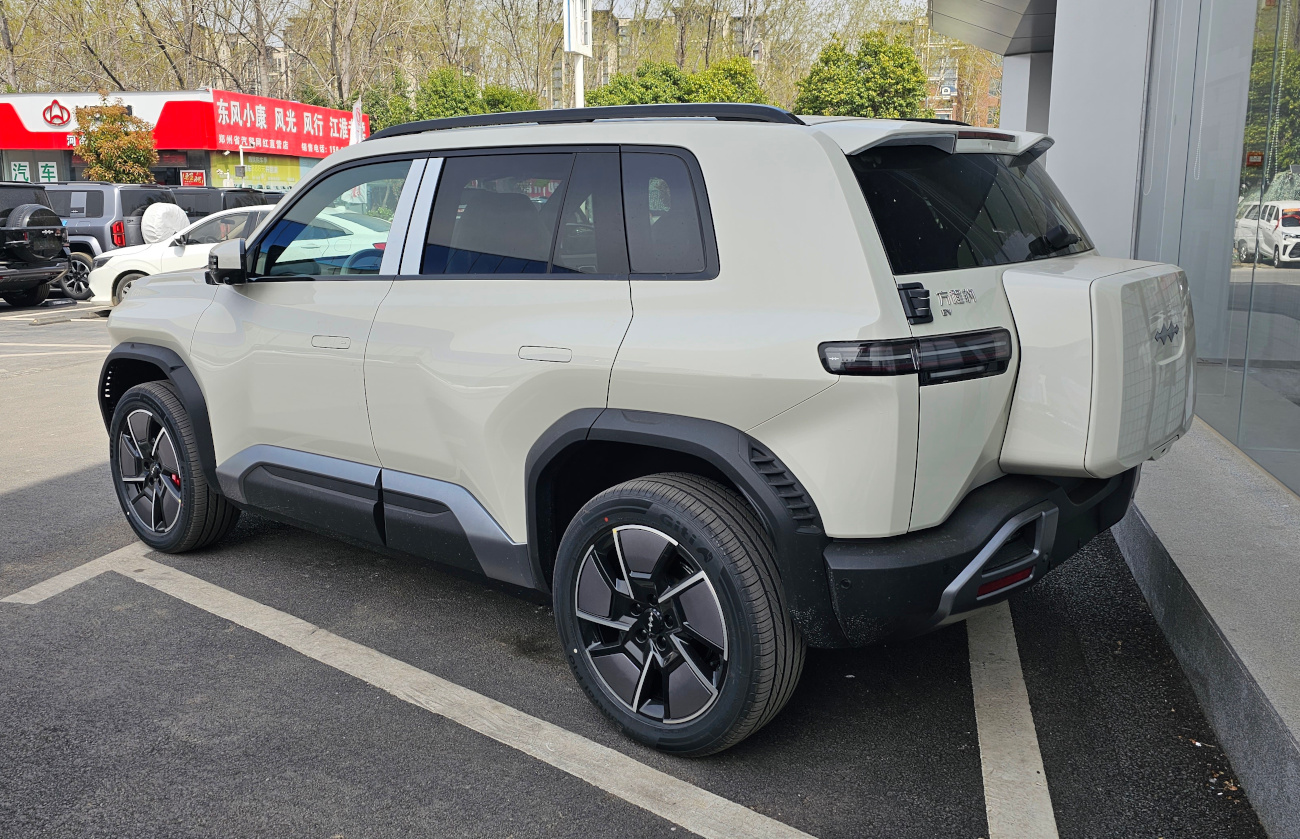
Rear view

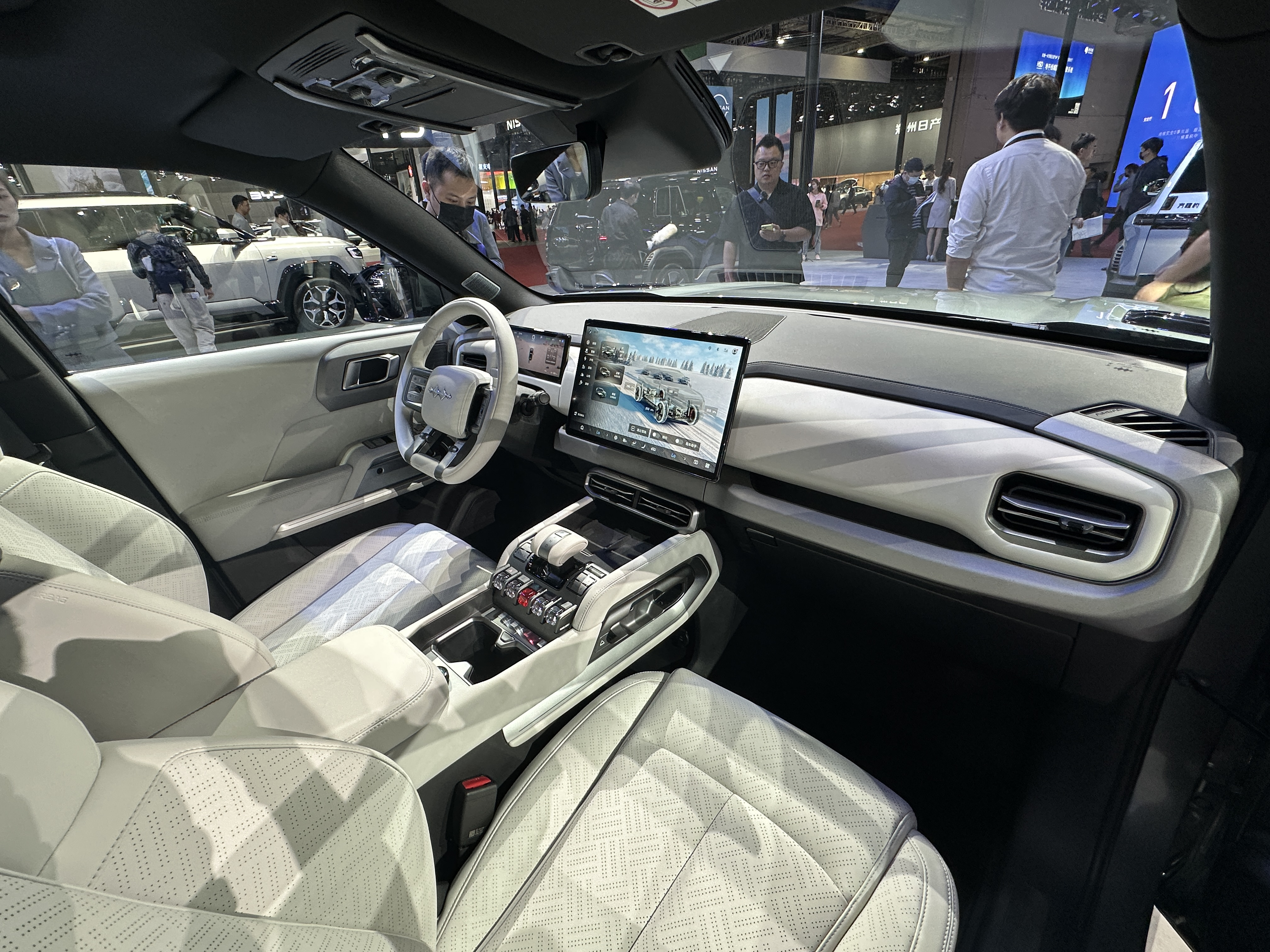
Interior

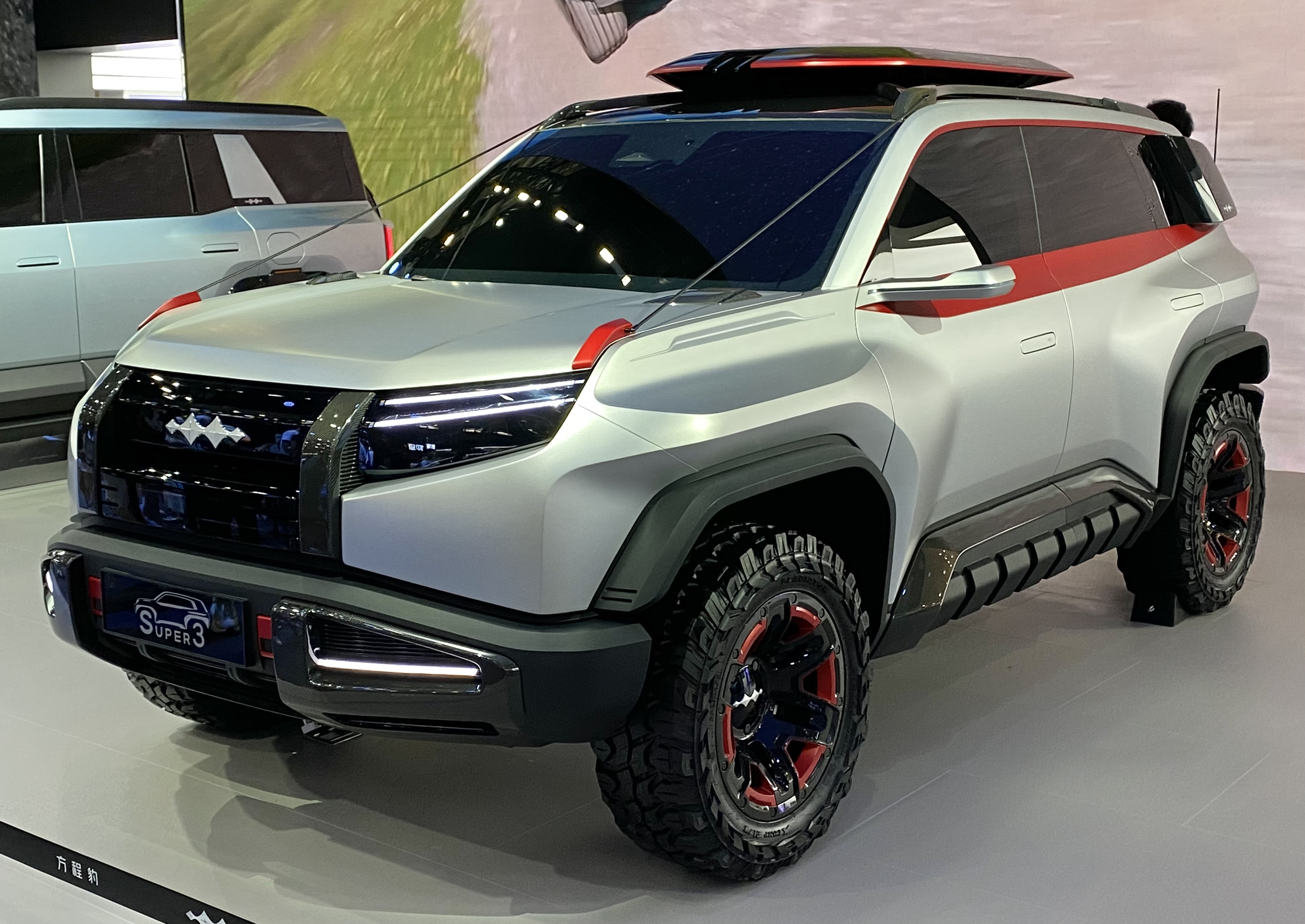
The Fangchengbao Super 3 concept, showcased in April 2024 at the Beijing Auto Show.

== Sales ==
Year	China
2025	62,176
