= Blade battery =

Type of lithium iron phosphate battery with elongated cell structure

Illustration of blades in a blade LFP battery pack

The blade battery (Chinese: 刀片电池; pinyin: Dāopiàn Diànchí; lit. 'blade-shaped battery') is a form factor for lithium iron phosphate (LFP) batteries characterised by flat, elongated prismatic cells arranged directly into battery packs without traditional module enclosures. Utilising a cell-to-pack (CTP) architecture, the design improves space utilisation, structural integrity, and safety relative to conventional cylindrical, pouch, and block prismatic cells.

The blade battery retains the standard characteristics of LFP chemistry, including low cost, high thermal stability, and the absence of nickel and cobalt in the cathode. While originally developed and introduced by BYD since 2020, the "blade" architecture has since become a widespread industry format. It is manufactured by various global battery suppliers and automakers, with variations such as the "short blade" battery being produced by companies like Geely and SVOLT.

== History ==
The blade battery format was pioneered by FinDreams Battery, a subsidiary of BYD Company. BYD first disclosed the imminent mass production of its Blade Battery on 11 January 2020, when chairman Wang Chuanfu announced at the China Electric Vehicle 100 Forum that the new battery was close to production readiness. At the same day's Third Sino-German Automotive Industry Summit, BYD's head of international cooperation disclosed the battery held over 300 core patents. The formal public launch event was held on 29 March 2020. During the presentation, Wang stated the design aimed to "erase the word 'spontaneous combustion' from the dictionary of new energy vehicles."

Production commenced at the Chongqing FinDreams Battery plant, which had an initial planned annual capacity of 20 GWh. The format debuted in the BYD Han EV in June 2020. By April 2021, BYD announced that all of its pure electric vehicle models would be equipped with the blade battery as standard.

== Design and construction ==
=== Cell format ===
Blade batteries utilize an elongated, flat prismatic cell geometry. Rather than the wound configuration typical of conventional prismatic cells, blade cells use a laminated stacking internal structure. The elongated profile increases the surface-area-to-volume ratio, which naturally enhances passive heat dissipation.

Dimensions vary depending on the manufacturer and the intended vehicle platform. A standard first-generation BYD "long blade" cell measures 960 mm in length, 90 mm in height, and 13.5 mm in thickness.

=== Structural integration ===
The defining characteristic of the blade battery is its use of cell-to-pack (CTP) or cell-to-body (CTB) integration. This architecture eliminates the module layer present in conventional battery hierarchies.

Blade cells are installed directly into the battery casing, spanning the full width of the pack and functioning as structural crossbeams. The cells are bonded to the upper and lower covers using structural adhesive, forming a rigid honeycomb-like structure. This design serves simultaneously as energy storage and structural reinforcement.

== Safety ==
The elongated cell geometry increases the surface-area-to-volume ratio, enhancing passive heat dissipation. The combination of LFP chemistry, which has a high exothermic reaction onset temperature, slow heat release, low heat generation, and does not release oxygen during decomposition, and the blade's thinness naturally limits the propagation of internal heat during a short circuit.

In nail penetration tests demonstrated at the March 2020 launch event, three battery types were compared under identical conditions. Conventional nickel-manganese-cobalt lithium batteries (NMC) reached surface temperatures exceeding 500 °C and underwent violent combustion. Conventional block-type LFP batteries reached surface temperatures of 200–400 °C without open flames. Blade LFP cells maintained surface temperatures of 30–60 °C with no smoke or fire. BYD further demonstrated the battery's passage of crush, bend, furnace heating to 300 °C (572 °F), and overcharging to 260% tests without fire or explosion, as well as the 46-tonne truck structural test.

== Manufacturer implementations ==
=== BYD / FinDreams Battery ===
As the pioneer of the format, BYD through its subsidiary FinDreams Battery produces a wide variety of blade cells. In 2021, FinDreams introduced a power-type short-blade variant for BYD's DM-i (Dual Mode intelligence) plug-in hybrid platform, which uses direct-cooling technology and typically ranges from 8.3 to 21.5 kWh.

On 5 March 2026, BYD unveiled its second-generation Blade Battery (Blade Battery 2.0) alongside a new 1,500 kW Flash Charging infrastructure. The second generation is offered in two formats: a Short Blade (approximately 450–580 mm) supporting an 8C peak charge rate, and a Long Blade achieving a cell-level energy density of 190–210 Wh/kg. The battery supports extreme fast charging, capable of reaching 10% to 97% state of charge in nine minutes. Cold-weather performance was also improved, allowing a 20% to 97% charge in 12 minutes at −30 °C (−22 °F).

=== Geely (Aegis battery) ===
In June 2024, Geely introduced the Aegis battery (神盾电池; also known as the New Short Blade EV Battery), an LFP blade-format battery with a cell-level energy density of 192 Wh/kg. Its cells measure 580 mm (22.8 in) in length, approximately 40% shorter than a standard long blade cell at 960 mm (37.8 in), resulting in lower internal resistance, reduced heat generation, and a claimed 50% improvement in volumetric utilisation. The Aegis battery supports over 3,500 charge cycles (equivalent to 1,000,000 km (620,000 mi)), charges from 10% to 80% in 17 minutes at an average rate of 2.45C, and retains 90.54% capacity at −30 °C (−22 °F). Performance improvements are attributed to long carbon nanotubes and permeability-enhancing additives. It debuted in the Geely Galaxy E5 with 49.52 kWh and 60.22 kWh pack options.

=== SVOLT (Fengxing battery) ===
In January 2025, SVOLT Energy unveiled the Fengxing Short Blade Battery (蜂行短刀电池), featuring a 6C charging rate enabling 10% to 80% recharge in 8.5 minutes, and a cell energy density of 185 Wh/kg using third-generation short blade cells. It is offered in an ultra-fast charging variant and a long-life variant rated for 15 years or 600,000 km (370,000 mi) with over 5,000 cycles. SVOLT separately introduced a short blade battery for off-road applications operating from −43 °C (−45 °F) to 60 °C (140 °F), with 5C pulse discharge at −20 °C (−4 °F) and 800 V charging support. For commercial vehicles, SVOLT launched a 91.4 kWh fast-charging variant (4C, 14-minute charge) and a 95.7 kWh long-life variant (3C, 8-year or 1.5-million-km warranty).

== See also ==
- Lithium iron phosphate battery
- FinDreams Battery
- BYD Blade battery
- Battery electric vehicle
- Thermal runaway
