= BYD Sealion 05 (2025) =

Battery electric compact crossover SUV

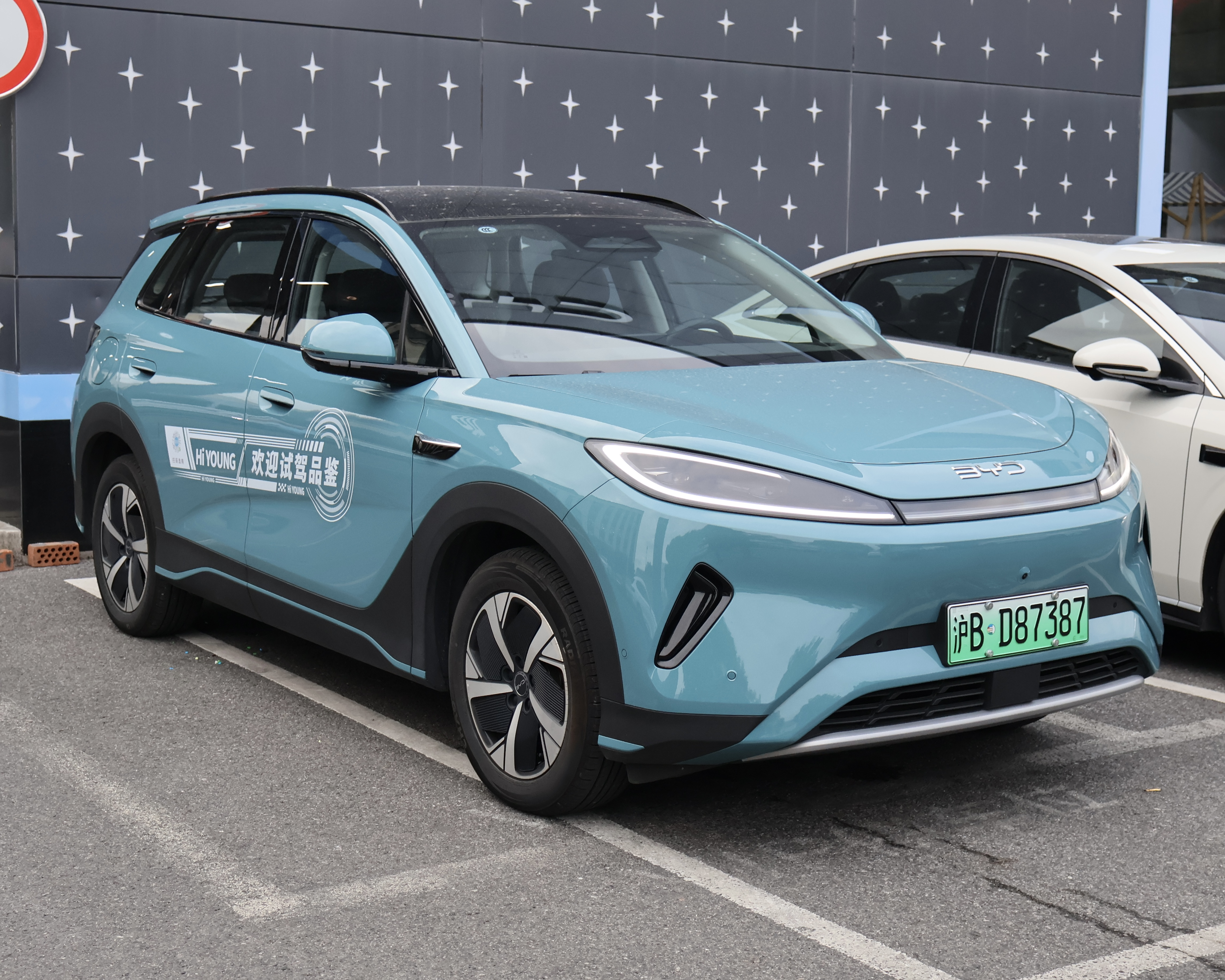

Overview
- Manufacturer: BYD Auto
- Model code: UNH (DM-i); UNE (EV)
- Production: March 2025 – present
- Assembly: China: Xi'an, Shaanxi
- Designer: Under the lead of Wolfgang Egger

Body and chassis
- Class: Compact SUV (C-segment)
- Body style: 5-door crossover SUV
- Layout: Front-engine, front-motor, front-wheel drive (DM-i); Rear-motor, rear-wheel-drive (EV)
- Platform: e-Platform 3.0 Evo (EV)
- Related: BYD Yuan Plus (second generation); BYD Qin L EV; BYD Seal 06 EV

Powertrain
- Engine: Petrol plug-in hybrid: 1.5 L BYD472QC I4 Atkinson cycle
- Electric motor: Permanent magnet synchronous
- Power output: 140–160 kW (188–215 hp; 190–218 PS) (EV)
- Hybrid drivetrain: Plug-in hybrid (DM-i)
- Battery: 50.05 kWh BYD Blade LFP; 60.93 kWh BYD Blade LFP
- Electric range: 430–520 km (267–323 mi) (CLTC)

Dimensions
- Wheelbase: 2,720 mm (107.1 in) (2025–2026); 2,770 mm (109.1 in) (2026–present)
- Length: 4,520 mm (178.0 in) (2025–2026); 4,620 mm (181.9 in) (2026–present)
- Width: 1,860 mm (73.2 in)
- Height: 1,630 mm (64.2 in)
- Kerb weight: 1,670–1,780 kg (3,682–3,924 lb)

Chronology
- Predecessor: BYD Sealion 05 DM-i (first generation) (DM-i)

The BYD Sealion 05 (Chinese: 比亚迪海狮05; pinyin: Bǐyǎdí Hǎishī 05) is a compact SUV manufactured by BYD Auto since 2025. Available with battery electric (EV) and plug-in hybrid (DM-i) powertrains, it is part of the "Sealion" (海狮; Hǎishī) line-up of SUVs under the Ocean Series product line-up that are distributed through Ocean Network dealerships in China.

== Design and equipment ==
The Sealion 05 EV was launched in China on 25 March 2025, with three trim levels.

The exterior of the Sealion 05 EV features the brand's Ocean Aesthetics design language. It features a minimalistic front fascia design with a small air intake, flushed door handles, black plastic trim on the wheel arches, and a continuous LED taillight bar.

The interior of the Sealion 05 EV features an 8.8-inch LCD instrument cluster, 12.8-inch touchscreen infotainment system, and the gear shifter used for the automatic transmission is mounted behind the steering wheel. The centre tunnel has a number of physical buttons, a wireless phone charging pad, a pair of cupholders, additional storage space below the centre console, and a storage box with cooling and heating functions. The boot space stands at 600 L (21 cu ft) and expands to 1,460 L (52 cu ft) with rear seats are folded down. There is a 110 L (3.9 cu ft) frunk storage.

For safety, the Sealion 05 EV is equipped with the God's Eye C (DiPilot 100) driving assistance system it is powered by five radars, 12 ultrasonic radars, and 12 cameras.

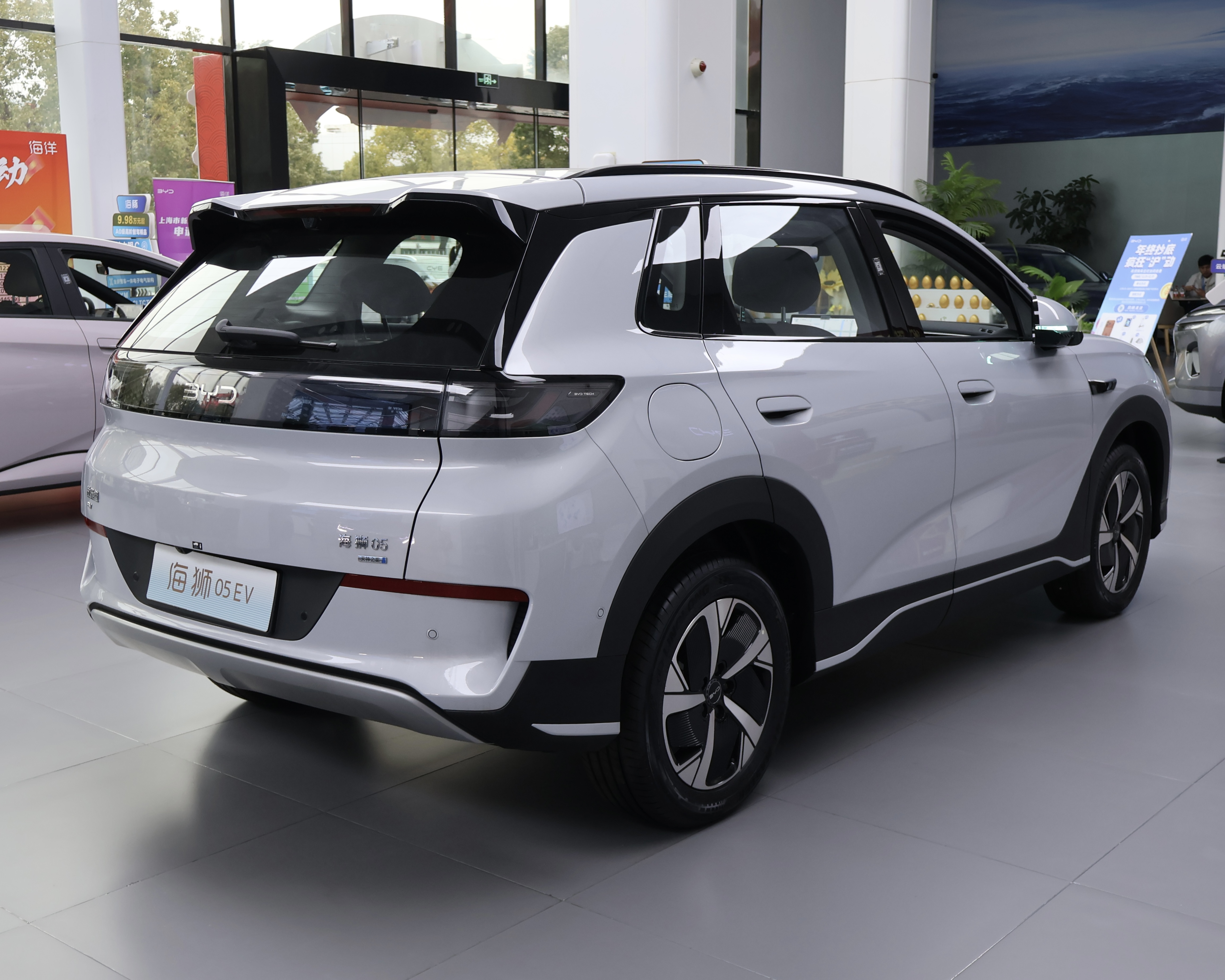
Rear view

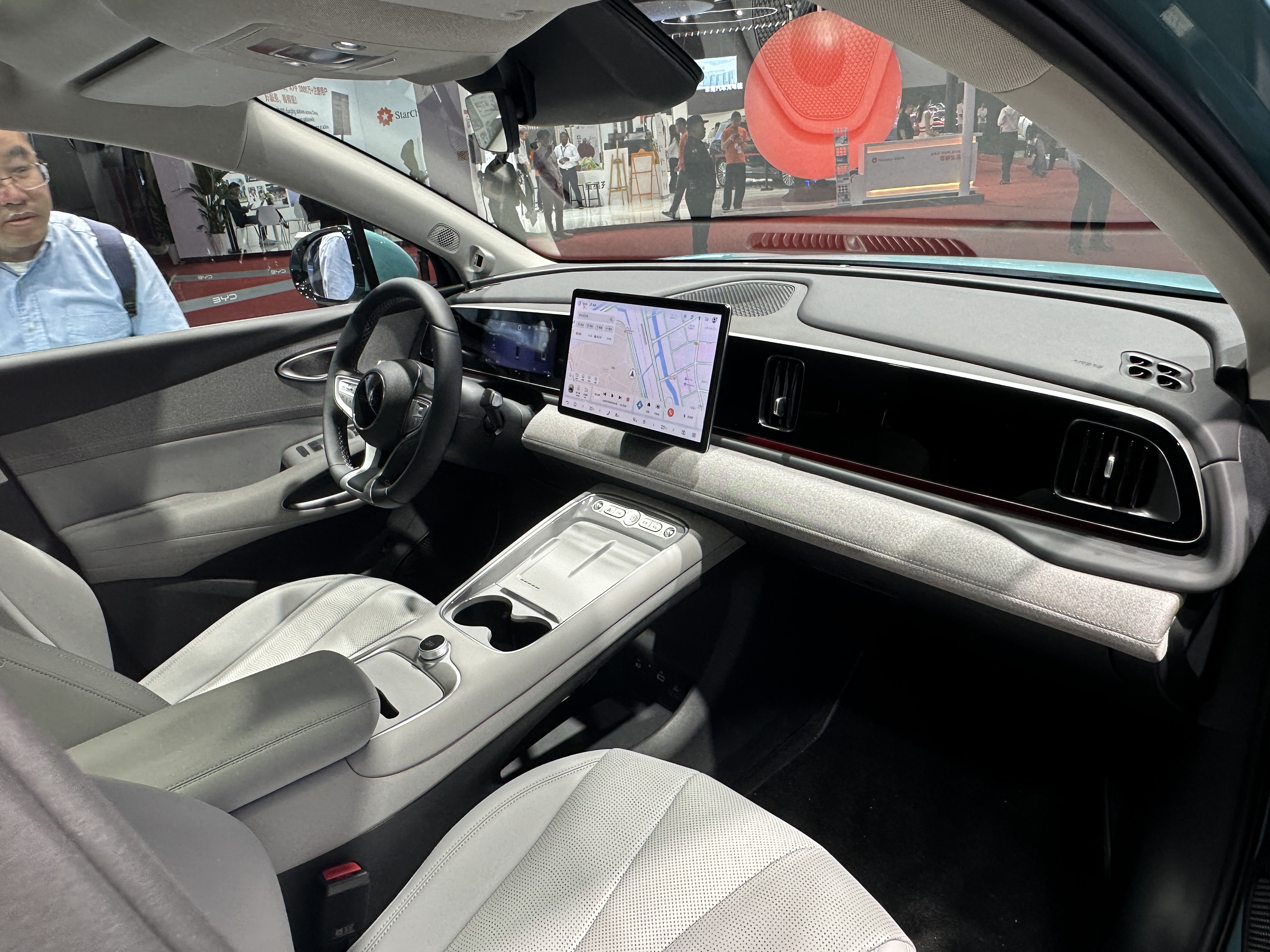
Interior

== 2026 facelift ==
The BYD Sealion 05 EV and BYD Sealion 05 DM-i both received an update for the 2026 model year, with both cars now sharing the same exterior body, making the 2026 Sealion 05 DM-i a complete new generation while the EV is merely a facelift. The 2026 update includes mild styling changes for the Sealion 05 EV and the flash charging technology which could finish charging the second-generation Blade Battery of the vehicle within 5 minutes giving it 391 miles of range.

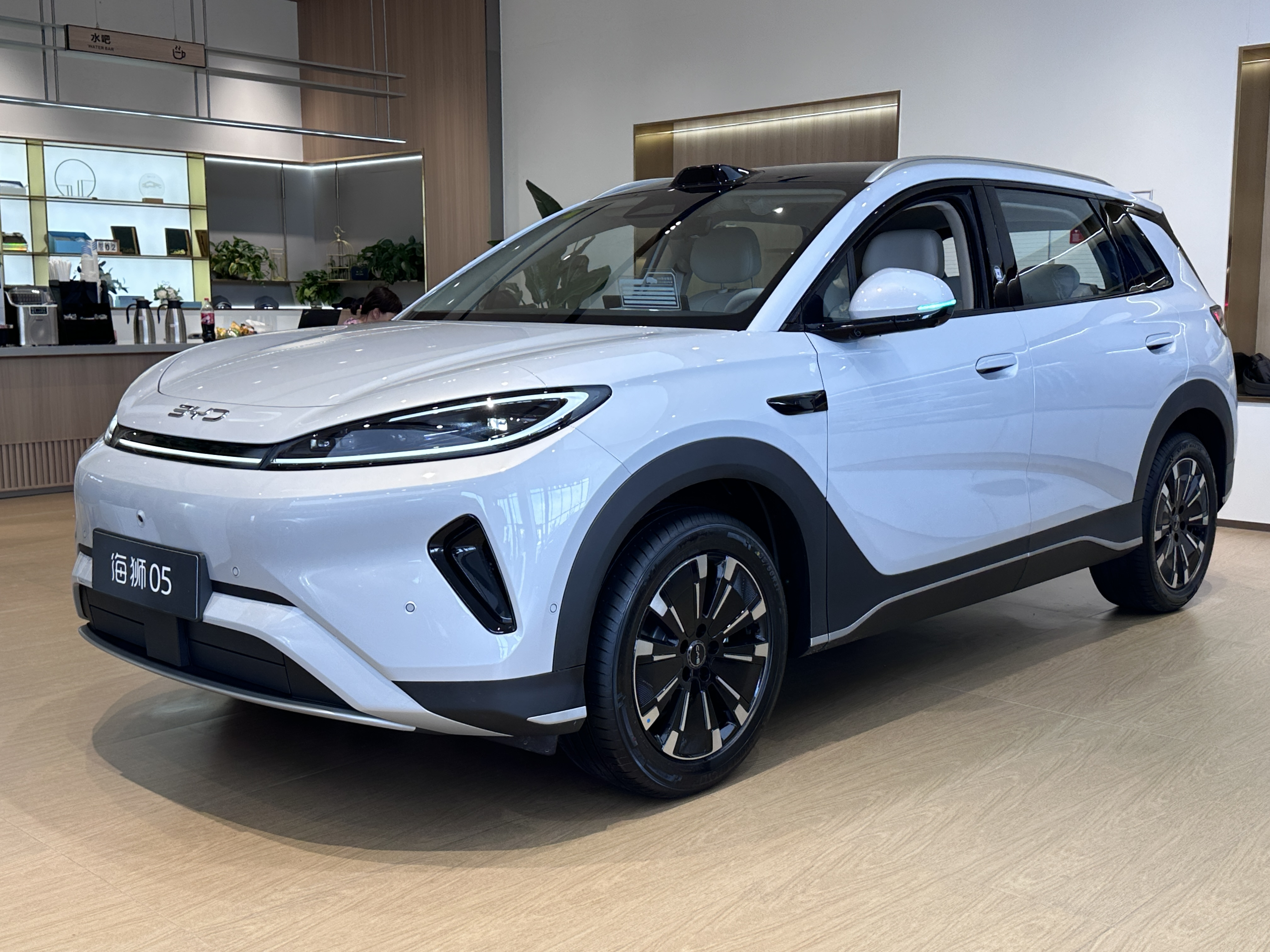
BYD Sealion 05 EV 2026 (facelift)

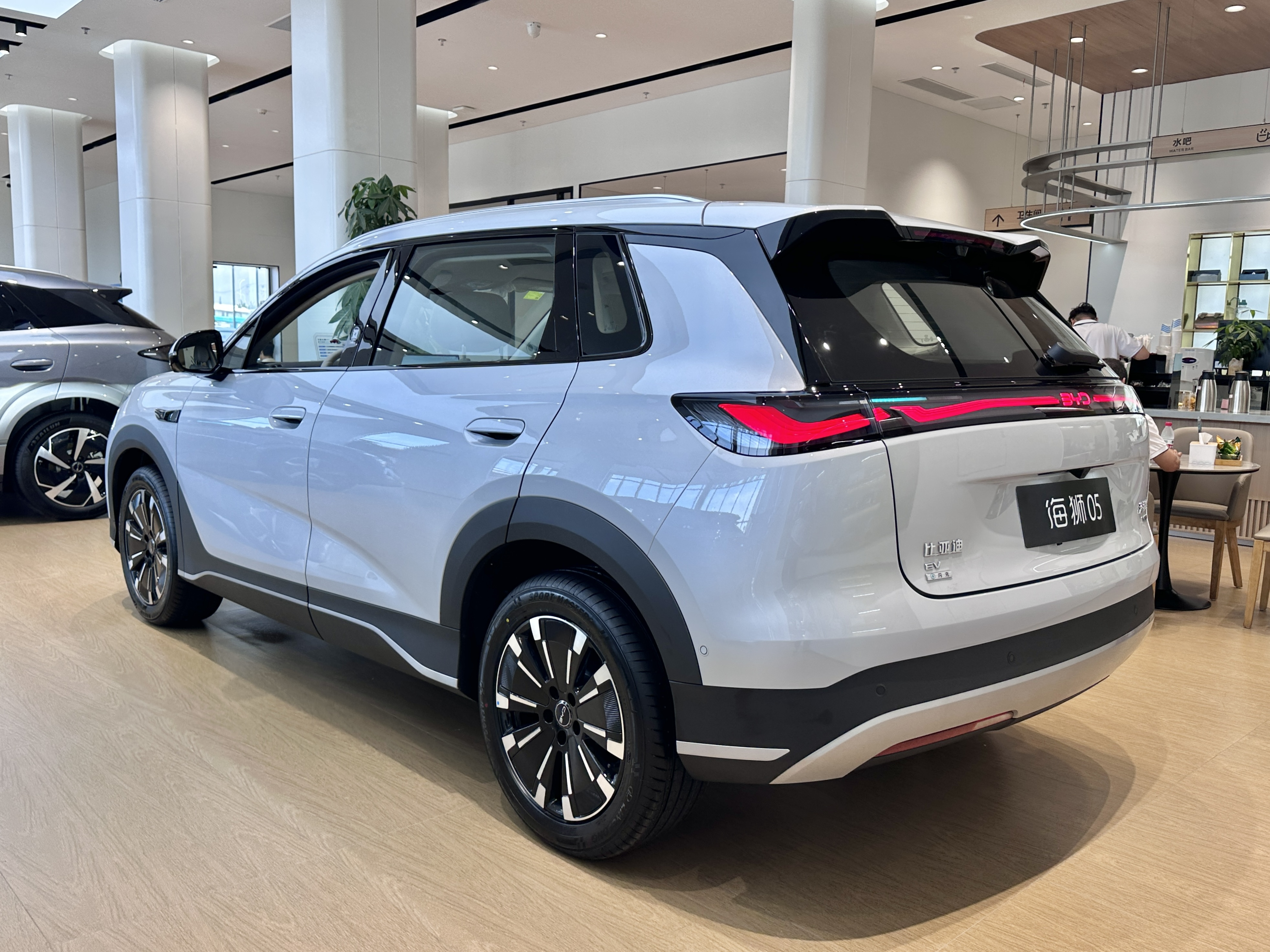
Rear view

== Sales ==
Year	China
2025	89,932

== See also ==
- List of BYD Auto vehicles
