= BYD Song Pro =

Compact crossover SUV

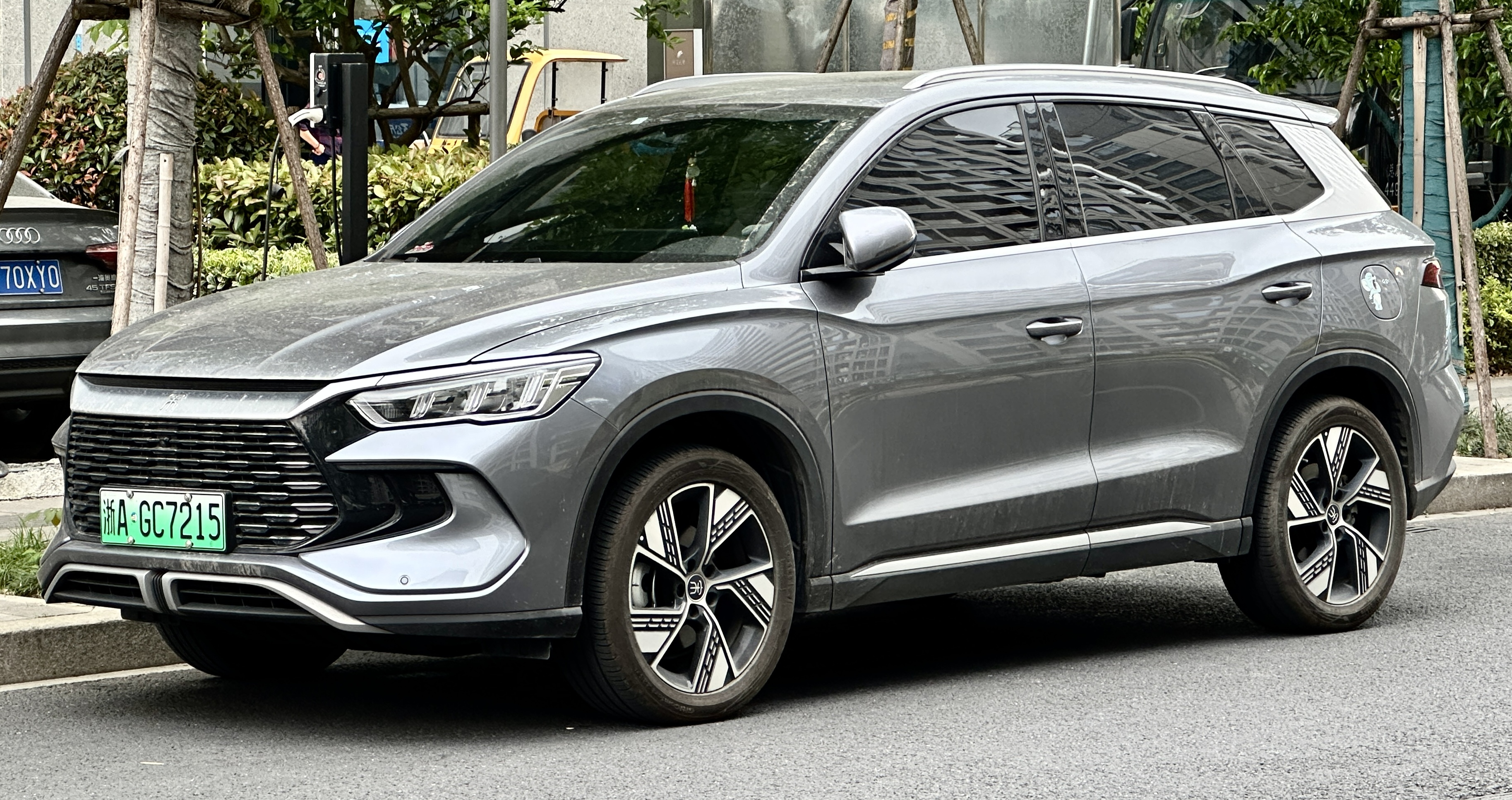
- 2023 BYD Song Pro DM-i

Overview
- Manufacturer: BYD Auto
- Model code: SA2
- Also called: BYD Sealion 5 DM-i (Philippines, Australia, Thailand, 2025–present)
- Production: July 2019 – present
- Assembly: China: Xi'an, Shaanxi; Hefei, Anhui; Zhengzhou, Henan; Jinan, Shandong; Brazil: Camaçari, Bahia; Thailand: Rayong (BYD Auto (Thailand), 2026–present); Cambodia: Sihanoukville

Body and chassis
- Class: Compact SUV
- Body style: 5-door crossover SUV
- Layout: Front-engine, front-wheel drive (petrol); Front-engine, front-motor, front-wheel drive (DM/DM-i); Front-motor, front-wheel drive (EV)
- Platform: BYD New Architecture (BNA); DM-i 4.0 platform (2021–present); DM-i 5.0 platform (2024 facelift)
- Chassis: Unibody
- Related: BYD Sealion 05 DM-i

Powertrain
- Engine: Petrol: 1.5 L BYD476ZQA I4 turbo; Petrol plug-in hybrid: 1.5 L BYD476ZQA I4; 1.5 L BYD472QC I4 Atkinson cycle
- Transmission: 6-speed manual; 6-speed DCT (DM); 7-speed DCT; E-CVT (DM-i)
- Hybrid drivetrain: Plug-in hybrid (DM/DM-i)

Dimensions
- Wheelbase: 2,712 mm (106.8 in)
- Length: 4,650–4,738 mm (183.1–186.5 in)
- Width: 1,860 mm (73.2 in)
- Height: 1,700–1,710 mm (66.9–67.3 in)

The BYD Song Pro (Chinese: 比亚迪宋Pro) is a compact SUV manufactured by BYD Auto since 2019. It is part of the BYD Song series of SUVs that are named after the Song dynasty.

During its introduction, the Song Pro was offered in three variants: an internal combustion engine (ICE) version with a 1.5-litre turbocharged petrol engine, the plug-in hybrid Song Pro DM and the battery electric Song Pro EV. Since 2022, only the plug-in hybrid version remains available, which has been upgraded to the newer DM-i plug-in hybrid powertrain.

The model is part of the Dynasty Series, marketed through the Dynasty Network dealership chain, and positioned below the larger BYD Song L DM-i. In 2024, an Ocean Series counterpart of the Song Pro, the BYD Sealion 05 DM-i, was introduced.

The Song Pro became available in outside China in 2024, mostly in Latin American countries to complement the more expensive BYD Song Plus. In the Philippines, it was introduced in June 2025 as the BYD Sealion 5 DM-i.

== Pre-facelift (2019–2021) ==
The Song Pro was introduced in early 2019. Based on the BNA (BYD New Architecture) platform shared with the Qin Pro, the Song Pro is positioned in the Chinese A+-class SUV segment, equivalent to a space between the global C-segment and D-segment. Its front end design adopts the "Dragon Face 2.0", the second-generation BYD Dragon face design language.

The Song Pro was available in three different powertrains, namely the petrol-powered Song Pro (until early 2022), the fully electric Song Pro EV (until 2021) and the plug-in hybrid Song Pro DM (updated to DM-i in 2022).

The petrol version Song Pro is powered by the same 1.5-litre turbo engine producing 113 kW (154 PS; 152 hp).

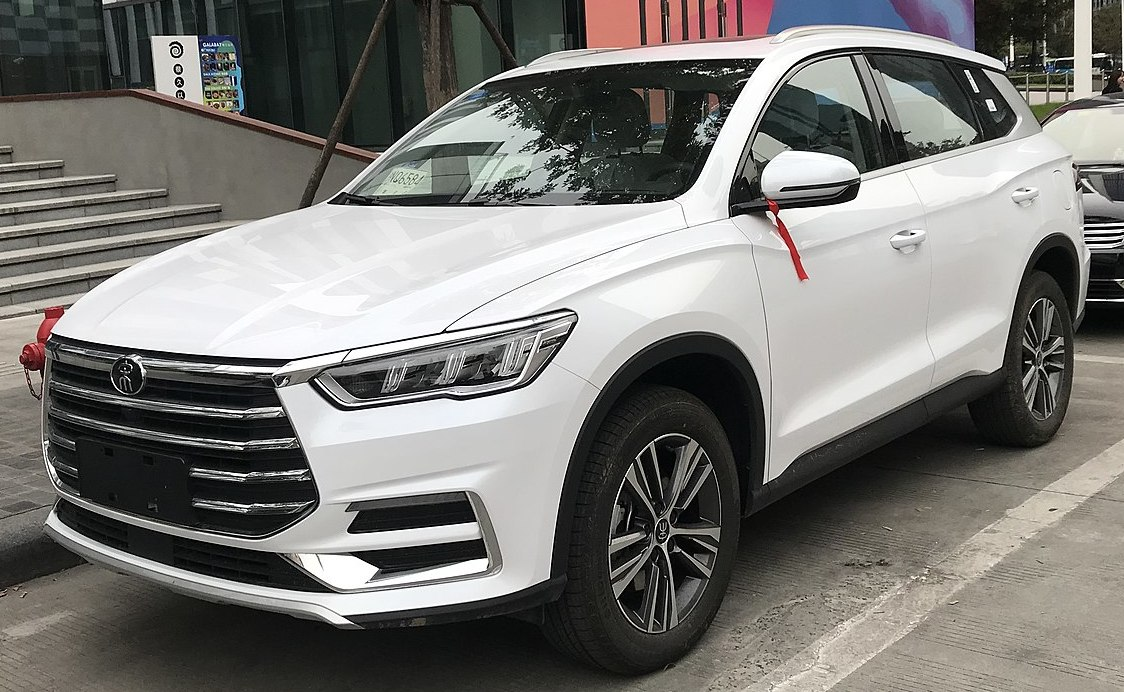
BYD Song Pro

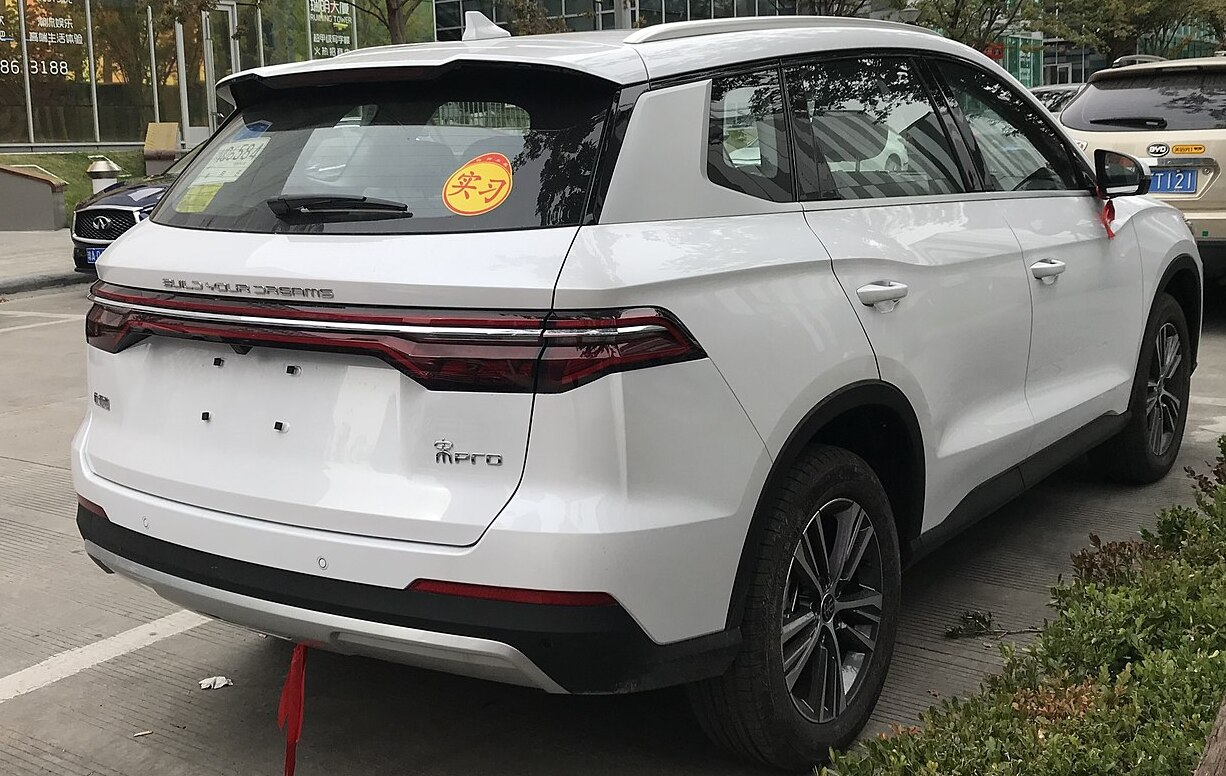
Rear view

=== Song Pro EV ===
The Song Pro EV was released alongside the petrol and plug-in hybrid Song Pro in July 2019. The model is powered by a 71 kWh ternary lithium battery and has a combined power output of 135 kW (181 hp; 184 PS). BYD claimed an NEDC electric range of 502 km (312 mi). It was available until 2021 as a 2019 model year.

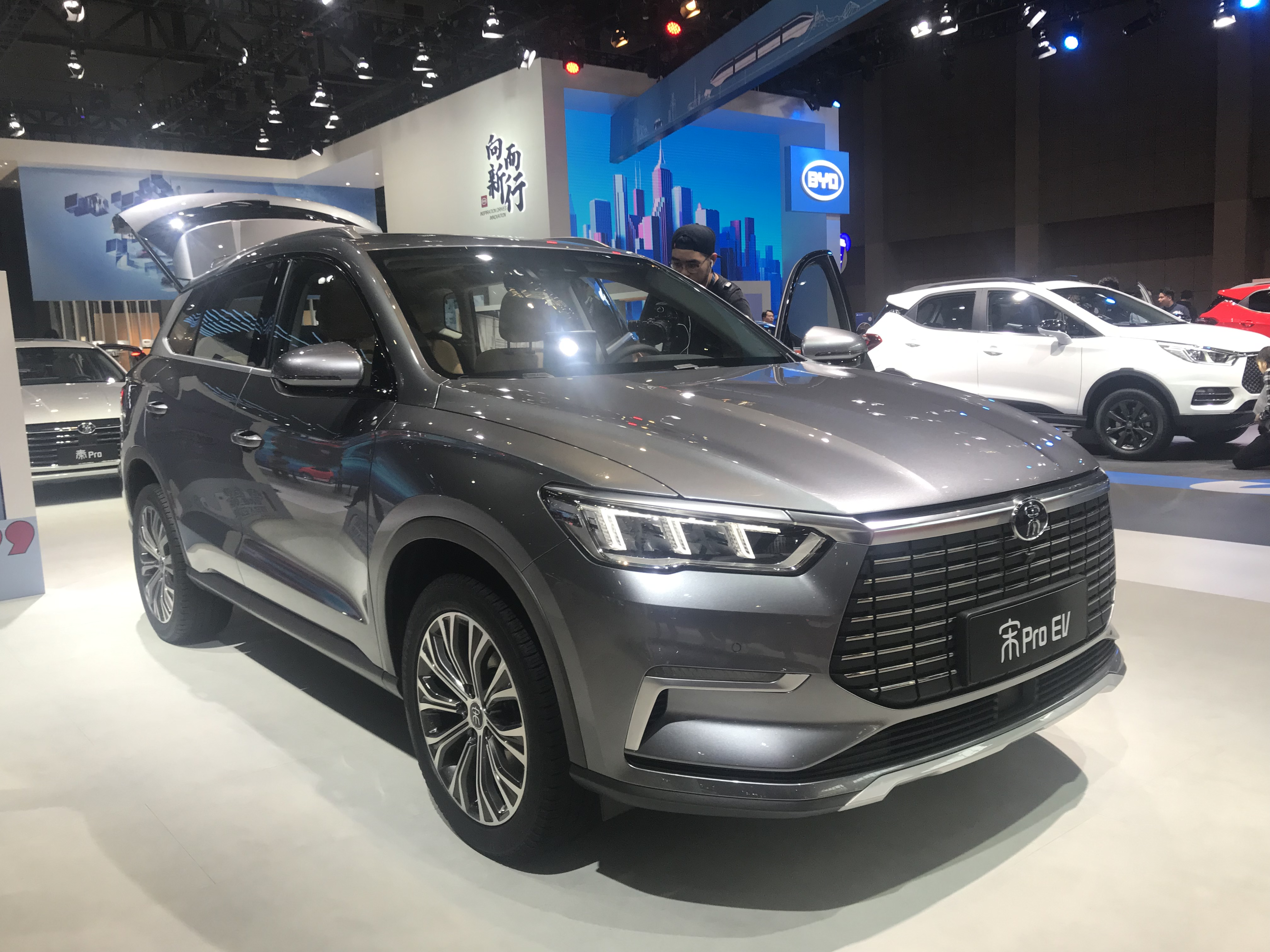
BYD Song Pro EV

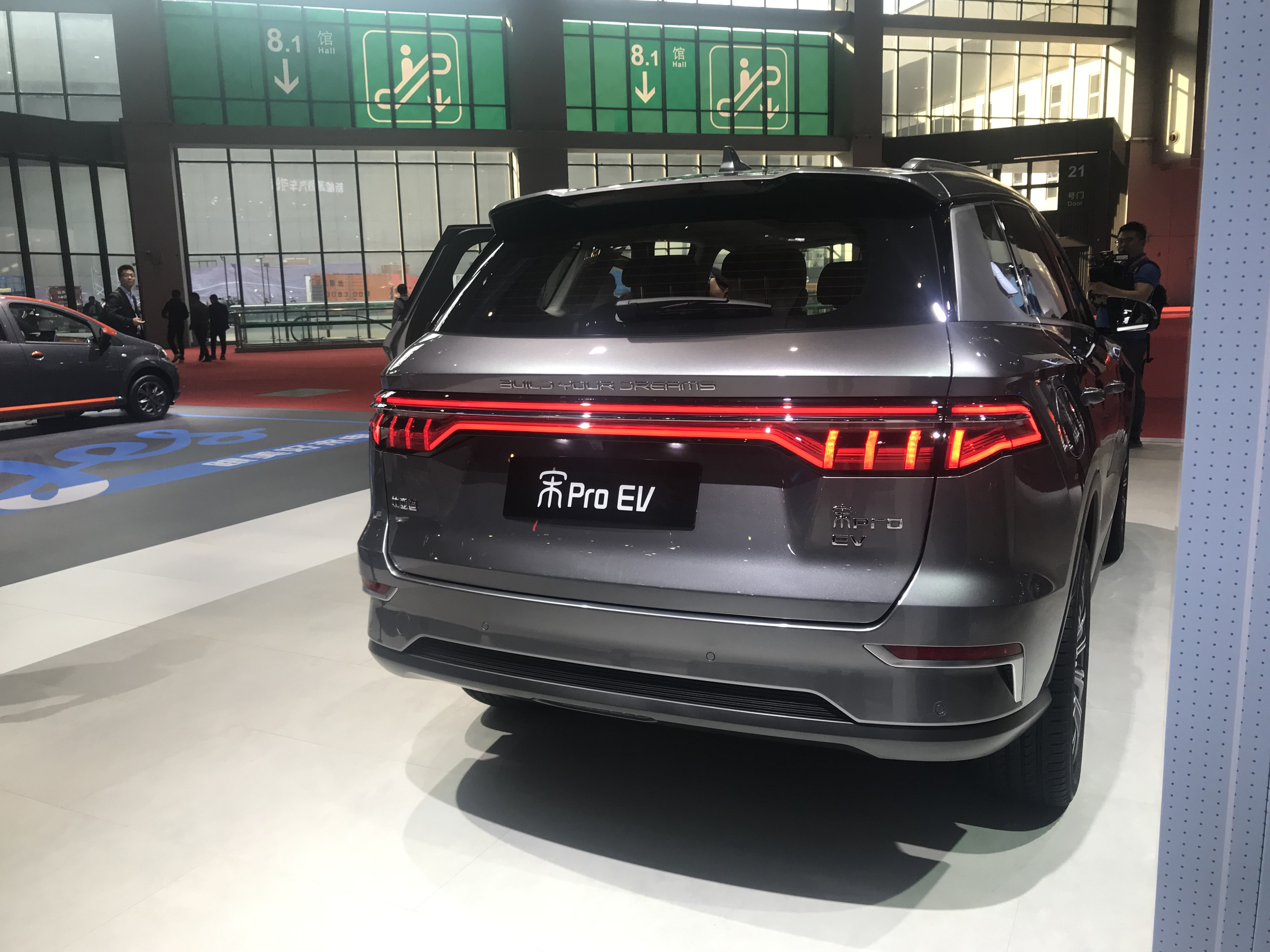
Rear view

=== Song Pro DM ===
The plug-in hybrid version was powered by the same 1.5-litre turbo engine as the petrol version while producing 118 kW (160 PS; 158 hp) with a fuel consumption of 1.4 L/100 km (170 mpg_{‑US}; 71 km/L).

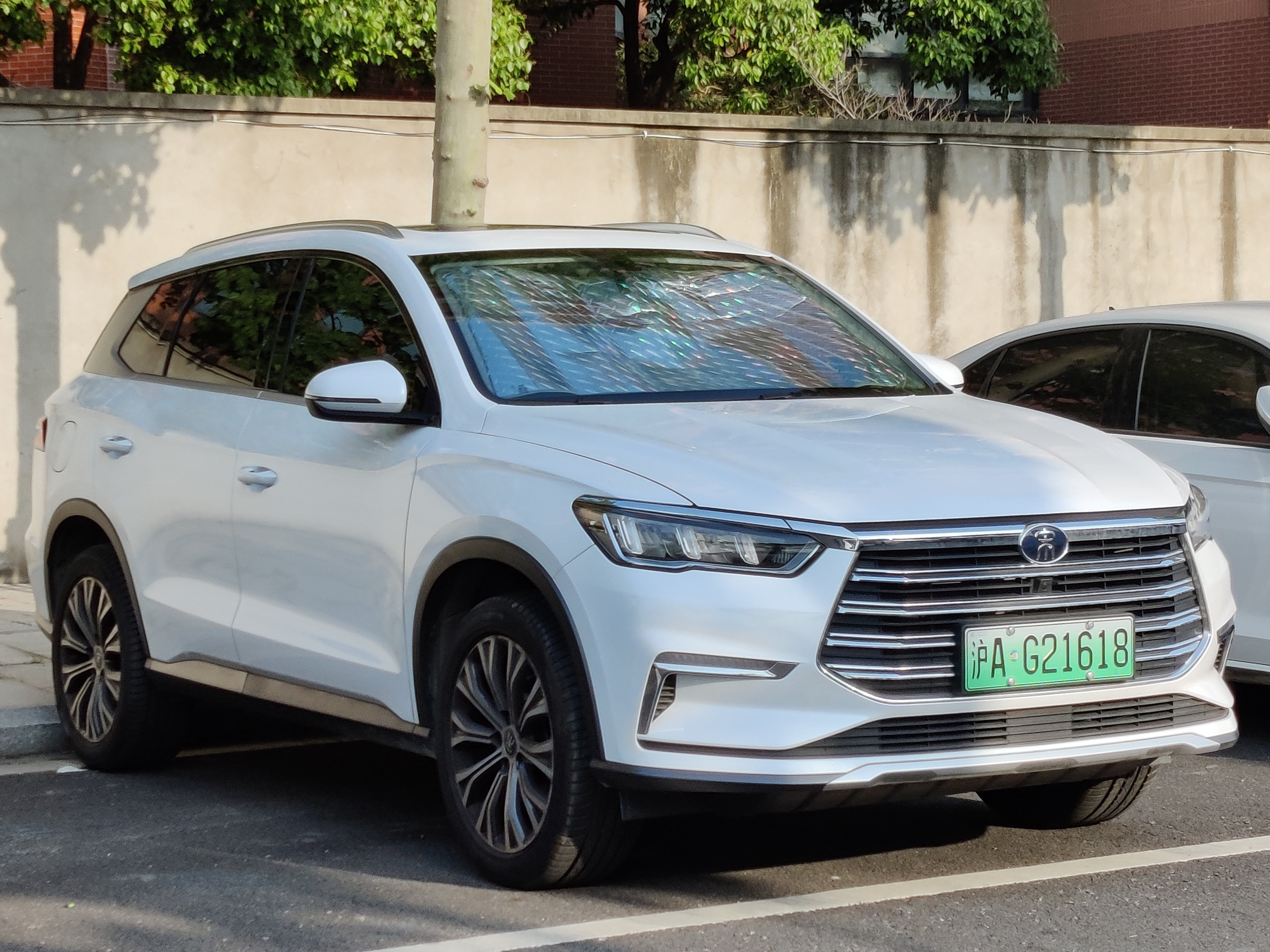
BYD Song Pro DM

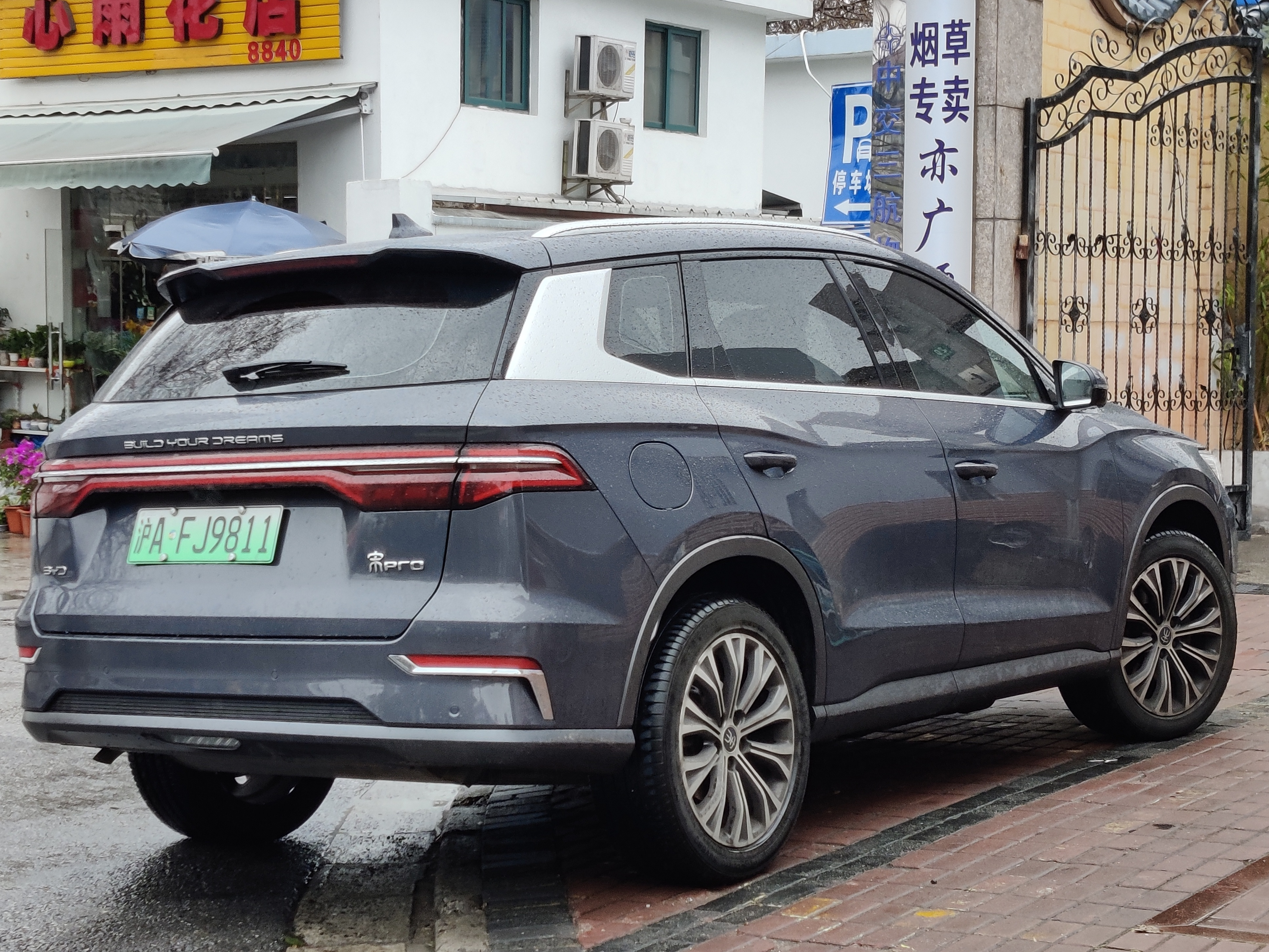
Rear view

== 2021 facelift ==
The Song Pro received a facelift and was updated with the DM-i powertrain from December 2021 for the 2022 model year. From 2022, the DM-i is the only remaining Song Pro model on sale. The Song Pro DM-i is powered by a 1.5-litre plug-in hybrid engine connected with the EHS system producing 173 kW (232 hp; 235 PS) and 0–100 km/h (0–62 mph) acceleration is completed in 7.9 seconds. It is equipped with an E-CVT gearbox.

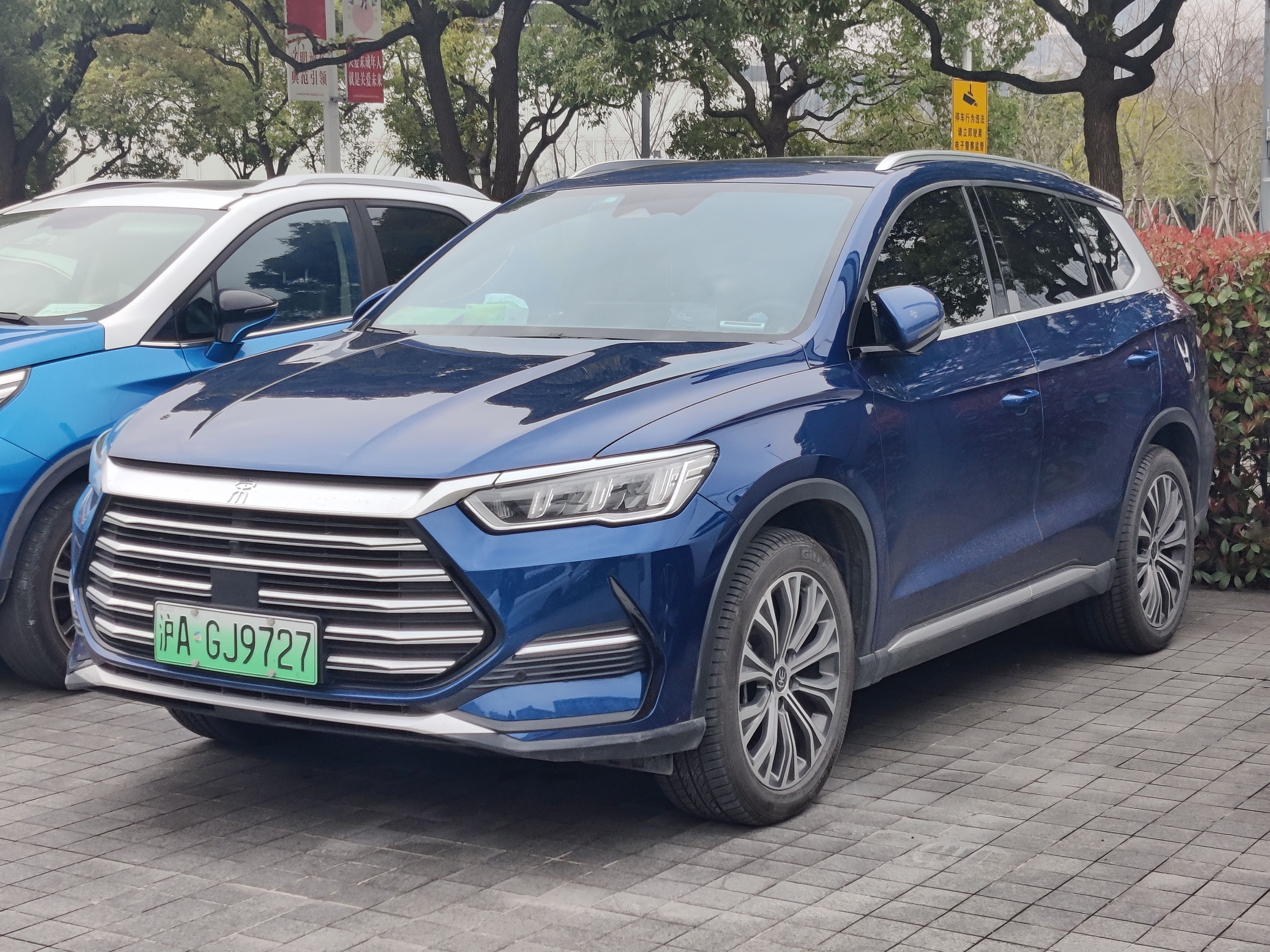
2022 BYD Song Pro DM-i

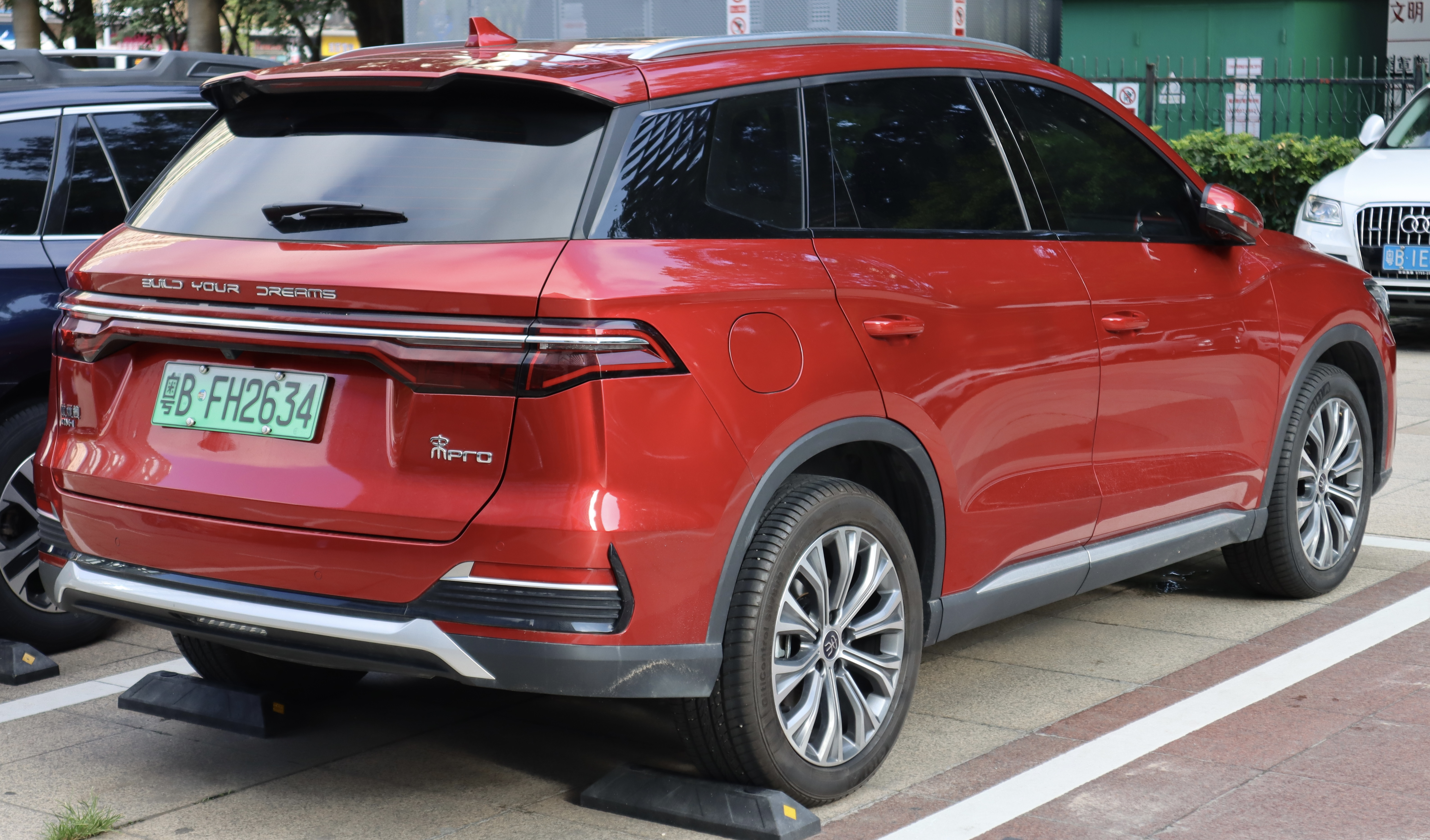
Rear view

== 2023 facelift ==
In May 2023, the Song Pro DM-i received another major facelift, initially marketed in China as the Song Pro DM-i Champion Edition. The front and rear of the vehicle were revised, extending its body length by 88 mm (3.5 in) to 4,738 mm (186.5 in). The interior design was also heavily updated. In March 2024, the model was further updated as the Song Pro DM-i Honor Edition, with price reductions and a new black exterior colour option.

Since 2025, the Song Pro second facelift would be exported to overseas markets such as Philippines and Australia, it is known as the BYD Sealion 5 DM-i.

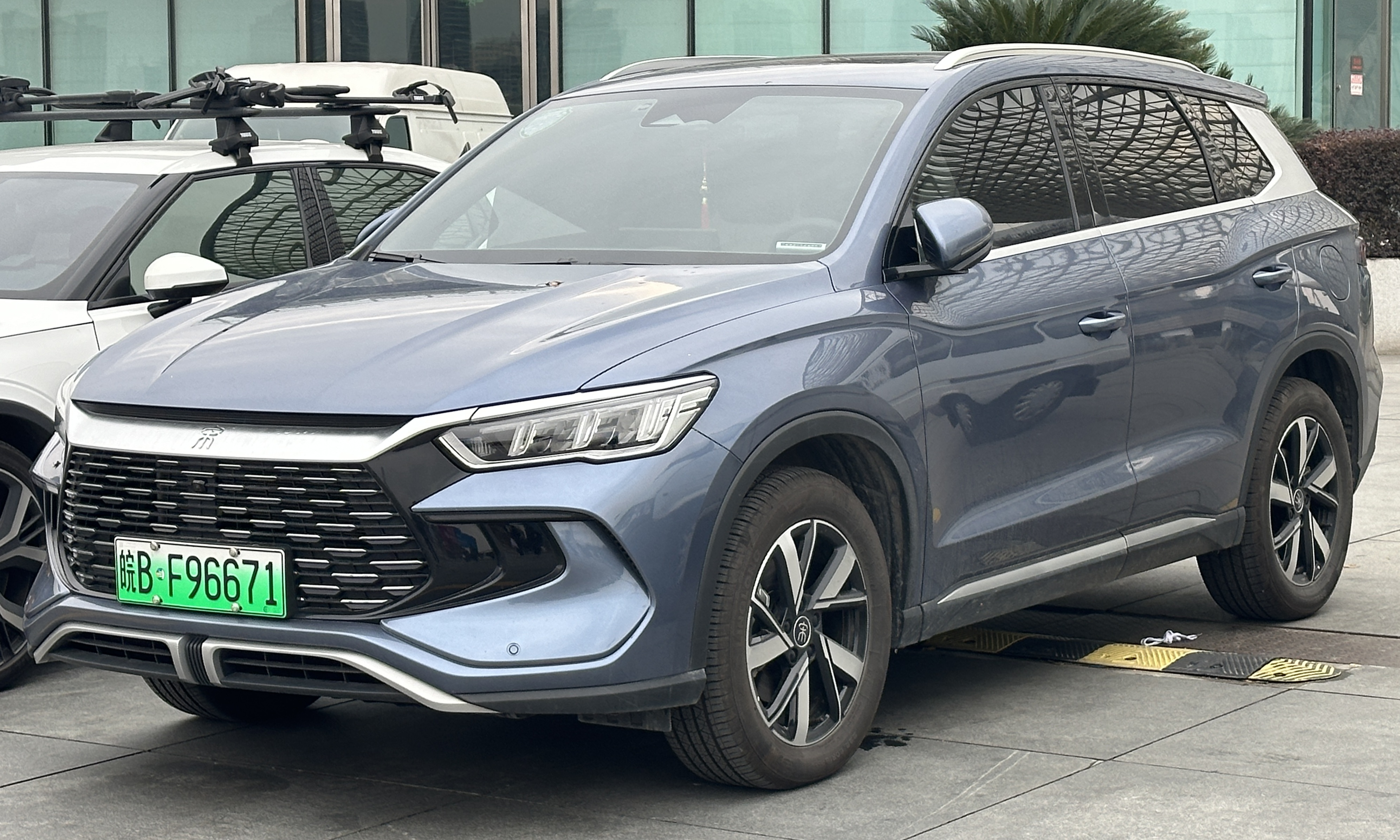
2023 BYD Song Pro DM-i

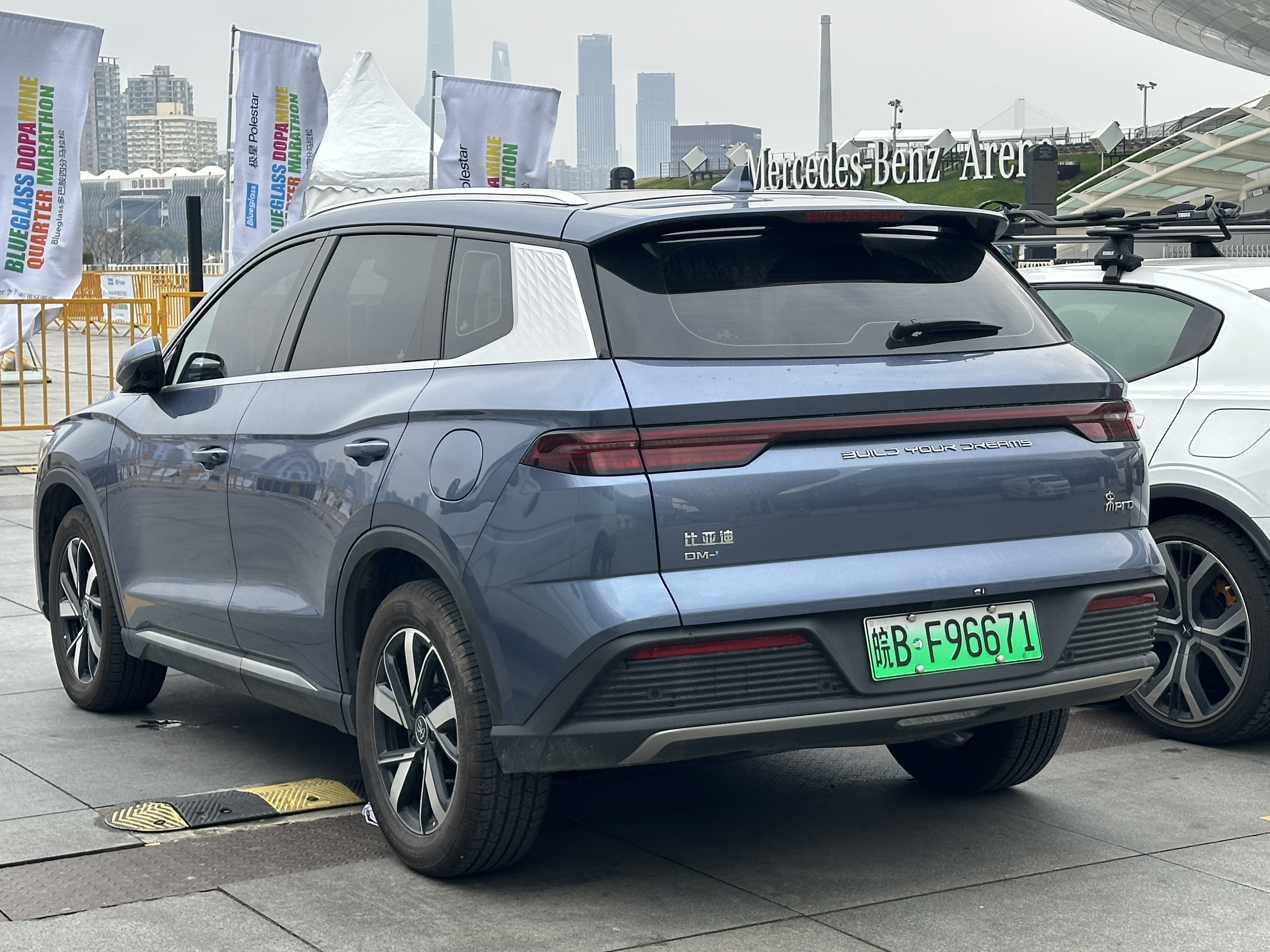
Rear view

== 2024 facelift ==
In September 2024, the updated Song Pro DM-i went on sale in China. It was introduced alongside its new sister model from the Ocean Series, the BYD Sealion 05 DM-i. It received major exterior and interior styling changes, as well as the DM-i 5.0 plug-in hybrid powertrain.

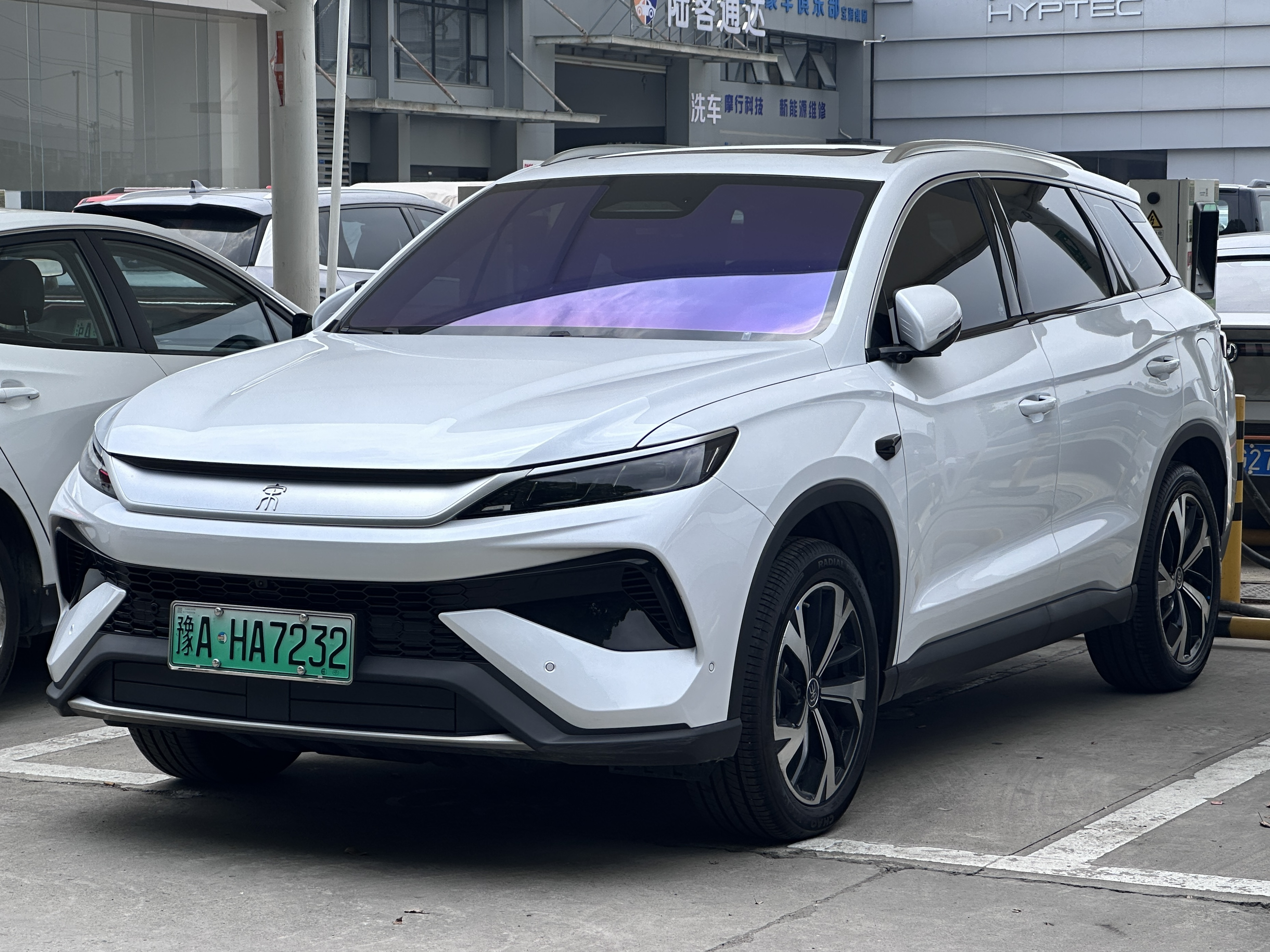
2024 BYD Song Pro DM-i

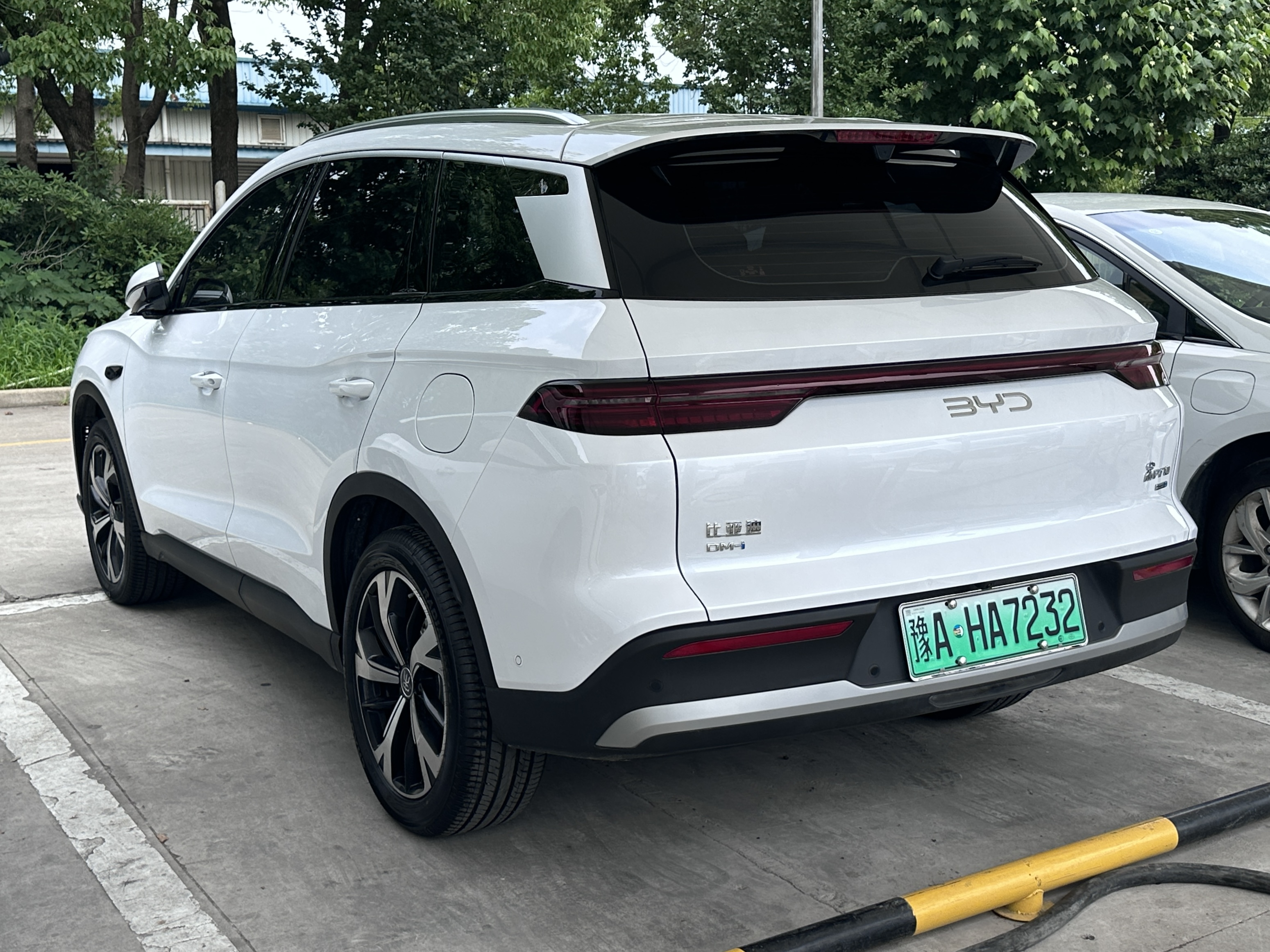
Rear view

== Markets ==
The Song Pro has been exported to left-hand drive countries since 2024, adopting the 2023 facelift styling.

=== Argentina ===
The Song Pro DM-i was launched in Argentina on 8 October 2025 as part of BYD's entry to the Argentinian market. It is available with two variants: GL (12.9 kWh) and GS (18.3 kWh).

=== Australia ===
The Sealion 5 DM-i was launched in Australia on 15 December 2025, with two variants available: Essential (12.9 kWh) and Premium (18.3 kWh). At the time of its introduction, the Sealion 5 DM-i was the cheapest plug-in hybrid vehicle (PHEV) on sale in Australia.

=== Brazil ===
The Song Pro DM-i went on sale in Brazil in July 2024, as a cheaper alternative to the Song Plus. It is available in two trim levels, the GL with a 12.9 kWh battery and GS with a 18.3 kWh battery. The model will be locally assembled in 2025 as the first Brazilian-made BYD, and will be equipped with a flex-fuel engine capable of using petrol and ethanol.

=== Cambodia ===
The Sealion 5, the Cambodian-market version of the BYD Song Pro DM-i, officially launched in 2025. Pre-orders for the vehicle began in February, with a formal market introduction in March. It combines a 1.5L petrol engine with an electric motor, offering a pure-electric driving range of approximately 71 km on a full charge, according to local user reviews. The Sealion 5 is available in Cambodia in multiple trims, such as the "Dynamic" model and a "Premium" model.

=== Mexico ===
The Song Pro DM-i went on sale in Mexico in August 2024 with a single trim offered, equipped with a 12.9 kWh battery.

=== Philippines ===
The Sealion 5 DM-i went on sale in the Philippines on 9 June 2025, slotting between the larger Sealion 6 DM-i SUV and the Seal 5 DM-i sedan in terms of pricing. A single trim with a 12.9 kWh battery is offered.

=== South Africa ===
The Sealion 5 DM-i was launched in South Africa on 5 December 2025, with two variants available: Comfort and Dynamic, both variants are equipped with a 12.9 kWh battery.

=== Thailand ===
The Sealion 5 DM-i was launched in Thailand on 16 March 2026, was available with two variants: Dynamic and Premium, both use the 18.3 kWh battery pack. In July 2026, the Standard (13 kWh) variant was added.

=== Vietnam ===
The Sealion 5 DM-i was launched in Vietnam on 21 October 2026, was available with two variants: Essential and Premium.

== Powertrain ==
=== Song Pro DM/DM-i ===
Type	Engine			Trans.	Battery	Layout	Electric motor				Combined output	0–100 km/h (62 mph)	Electric range			Calendar years
Type	Displ.	Power	Torque	Trans.	Battery	Layout	Type		Power	Torque	Combined output	0–100 km/h (62 mph)	CLTC	NEDC	WLTC	Calendar years
1.5T DM 4WD	BYD476ZQB 1,497 cc (1.5 L) I4	118 kW (158 hp)	245 N⋅m (25.0 kg⋅m; 181 lb⋅ft)	6-speed DCT	15.7 kWh	AWD	Rear	PMSM	120 kW (161 hp)	280 N⋅m (28.6 kg⋅m; 207 lb⋅ft)	238 kW (319 hp), 525 N⋅m (53.5 kg⋅m; 387 lb⋅ft)	6.5 sec	81 km (50 mi)	N/A	N/A	2019–2022
1.5L 51 km DM-i	BYD472QA 1,498 cc (1.5 L) I4	81 kW (109 hp)	135 N⋅m (13.8 kg⋅m; 99.6 lb⋅ft)	E-CVT	8.3 kWh LFP Blade	FWD	Front	PMSM	132 kW (177 hp)	316 N⋅m (32.2 kg⋅m; 233 lb⋅ft)		8.3 sec	51 km (32 mi)	N/A	N/A	2022–2023
1.5L 71 km DM-i	BYD472QA 1,498 cc (1.5 L) I4	81 kW (109 hp)	135 N⋅m (13.8 kg⋅m; 99.6 lb⋅ft)	E-CVT	12.9 kWh LFP Blade	FWD	Front	TZ220XYE PMSM	145 kW (194 hp)	325 N⋅m (33.1 kg⋅m; 240 lb⋅ft)		8.3 sec	71 km (44 mi)	N/A	59 km (37 mi)	2023–2024
1.5L 110 km DM-i	BYD472QA 1,498 cc (1.5 L) I4	81 kW (109 hp)	135 N⋅m (13.8 kg⋅m; 99.6 lb⋅ft)	E-CVT	18.3 kWh LFP Blade	FWD	Front	TZ220XYE PMSM	145 kW (194 hp)	325 N⋅m (33.1 kg⋅m; 240 lb⋅ft)		7.9 sec	110 km (68 mi)	N/A	85 km (53 mi)	2022–2024
1.5L 75 km DM-i	BYD472QC 1,498 cc (1.5 L) I4	74 kW (99 hp)	126 N⋅m (12.8 kg⋅m; 92.9 lb⋅ft)	E-CVT	12.9 kWh LFP Blade	FWD	Front	TZ210XYB PMSM	120 kW (161 hp)	210 N⋅m (21.4 kg⋅m; 155 lb⋅ft)		8.3 sec	75 km (47 mi)	70 km (43 mi)	64 km (40 mi)	2024–present
1.5L 115 km DM-i	BYD472QC 1,498 cc (1.5 L) I4	74 kW (99 hp)	126 N⋅m (12.8 kg⋅m; 92.9 lb⋅ft)	E-CVT	18.3 kWh LFP Blade	FWD	Front	TZ210XYB PMSM	120 kW (161 hp)	210 N⋅m (21.4 kg⋅m; 155 lb⋅ft)		8.5 sec	115 km (71 mi)	110 km (68 mi)	93 km (58 mi)	2024–present
1.5L DM-i 18.3 kWh (Export)	BYD472QC 1,498 cc (1.5 L) I4	70 kW (94 hp)	125 N⋅m (12.7 kg⋅m; 92.2 lb⋅ft)	E-CVT	18.3 kWh LFP Blade	FWD	Front	TZ210XYB PMSM	120 kW (161 hp)	210 N⋅m (21.4 kg⋅m; 155 lb⋅ft)	154 kW (207 hp)	8.5 sec	N/A	110 km (68 mi)	N/A	2025–present

== Sales ==
Year	China			Brazil
Year	ICE	DM/DM-i	EV	DM-i
2020	80,854	5,272	6,820	—
2021		79,508	29,340	—
2022		20,323		—
2023		209,690		—
2024	—	241,598	—	9,671
2025	—	180,661	—	22,538

== See also ==
- List of BYD Auto vehicles
