= BYD Sealion =

Automotive nameplate by BYD

BYD Sealion or BYD Sea Lion as a Chinese name translation (Chinese: 比亚迪海獅; pinyin: Bǐyǎdí Hǎishī) may refer to:

- BYD Sealion 05 DM-i, a plug-in hybrid compact SUV produced since 2024
  - BYD Sealion 5 DM-i, a similar plug-in hybrid compact SUV for the Cambodian, Philippine, and Australian market, renamed BYD Song Pro
- BYD Sealion 05 EV, a battery electric compact SUV produced since 2025
- BYD Sealion 6, a plug-in hybrid SUV, renamed BYD Song Plus DM-i
- BYD Sealion 06, a battery electric and plug-in hybrid mid-size SUV produced since 2025
- BYD Sealion 7 or Sealion 07 EV, a battery electric mid-size SUV produced since 2024
- BYD Sealion 07 DM-i, a plug-in hybrid mid-size SUV produced from 2025 to 2026, successor to the BYD Frigate 07
- BYD Sealion 8, a battery electric mid-size SUV produced since 2025 for the Vietnamese market, renamed BYD Tang EV
- BYD Sealion 8 DM-i, an upcoming plug-in hybrid mid-size SUV, renamed BYD Tang L DM-i
- BYD Sealion 08, a battery electric full-size SUV produced since 2026
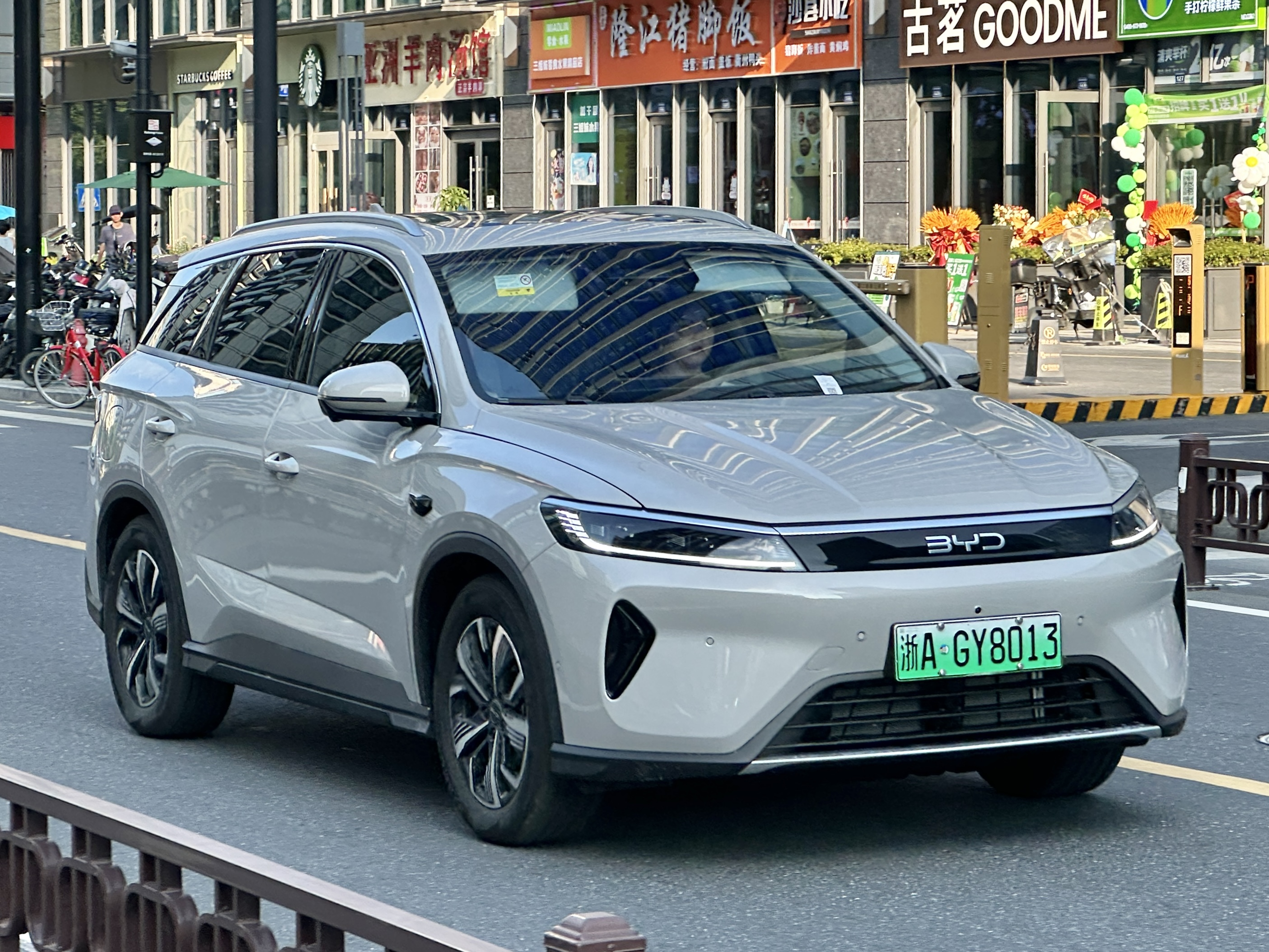
BYD Sealion 05 DM-i

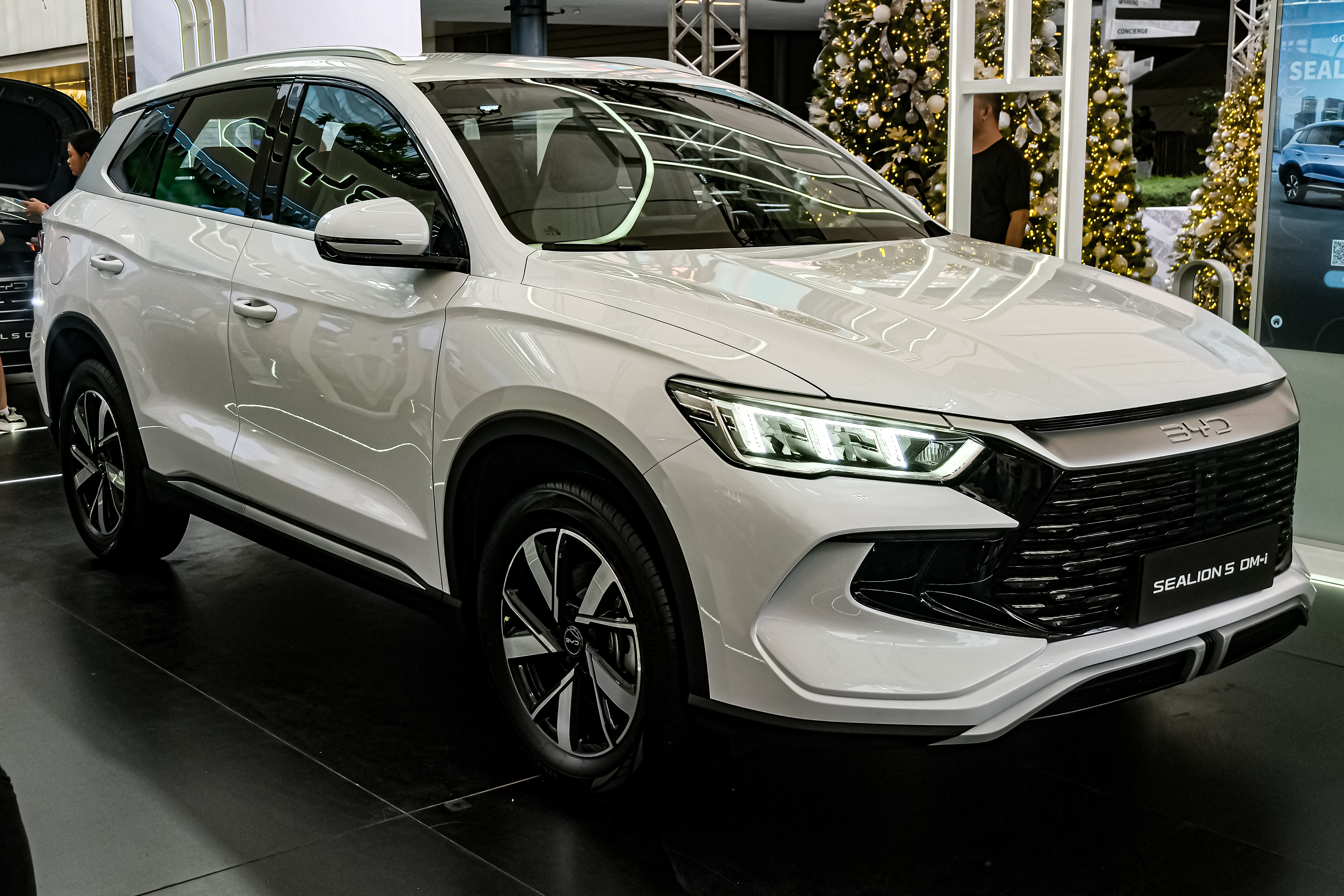
BYD Sealion 5 DM-i

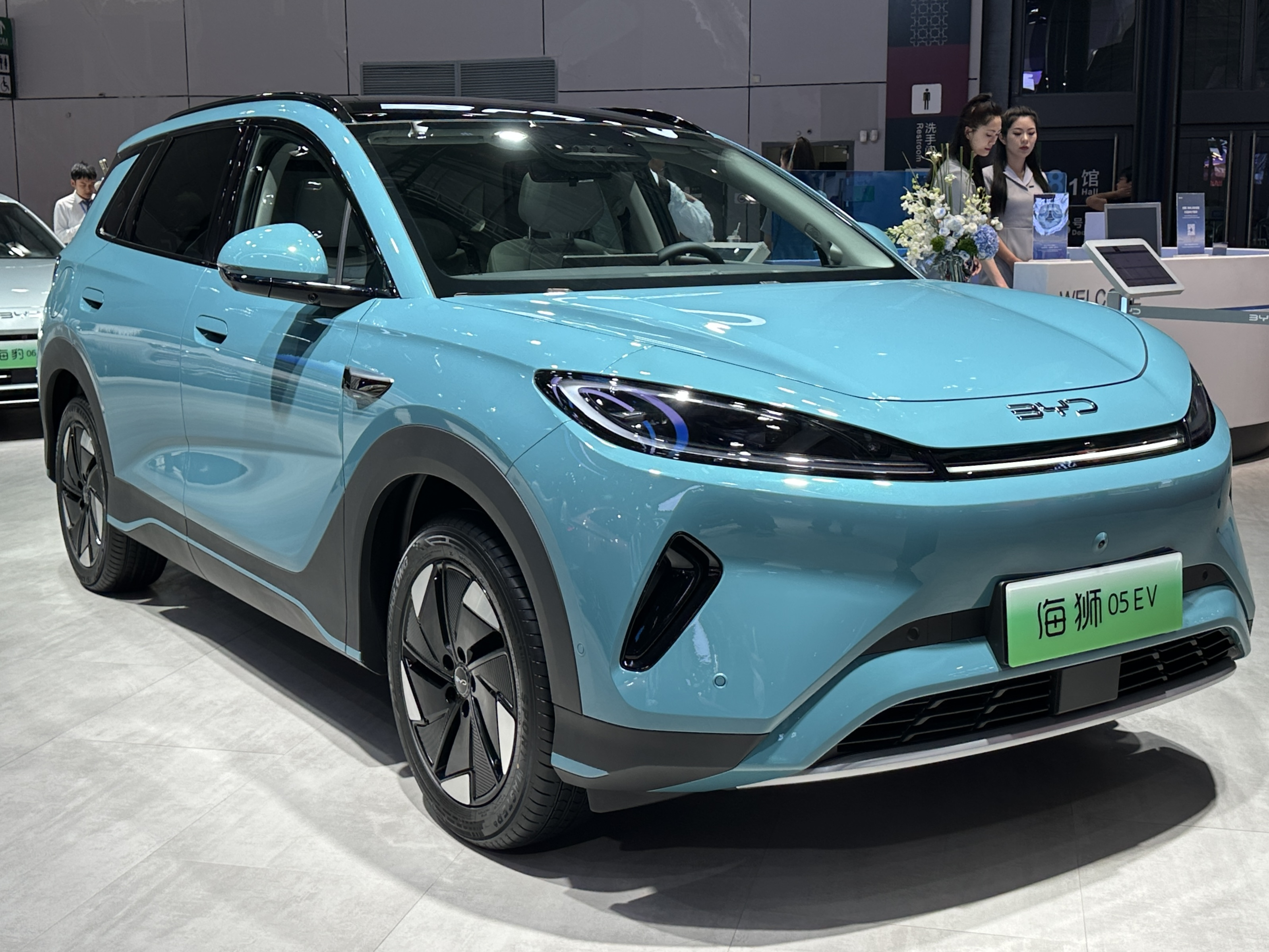
BYD Sealion 05 EV

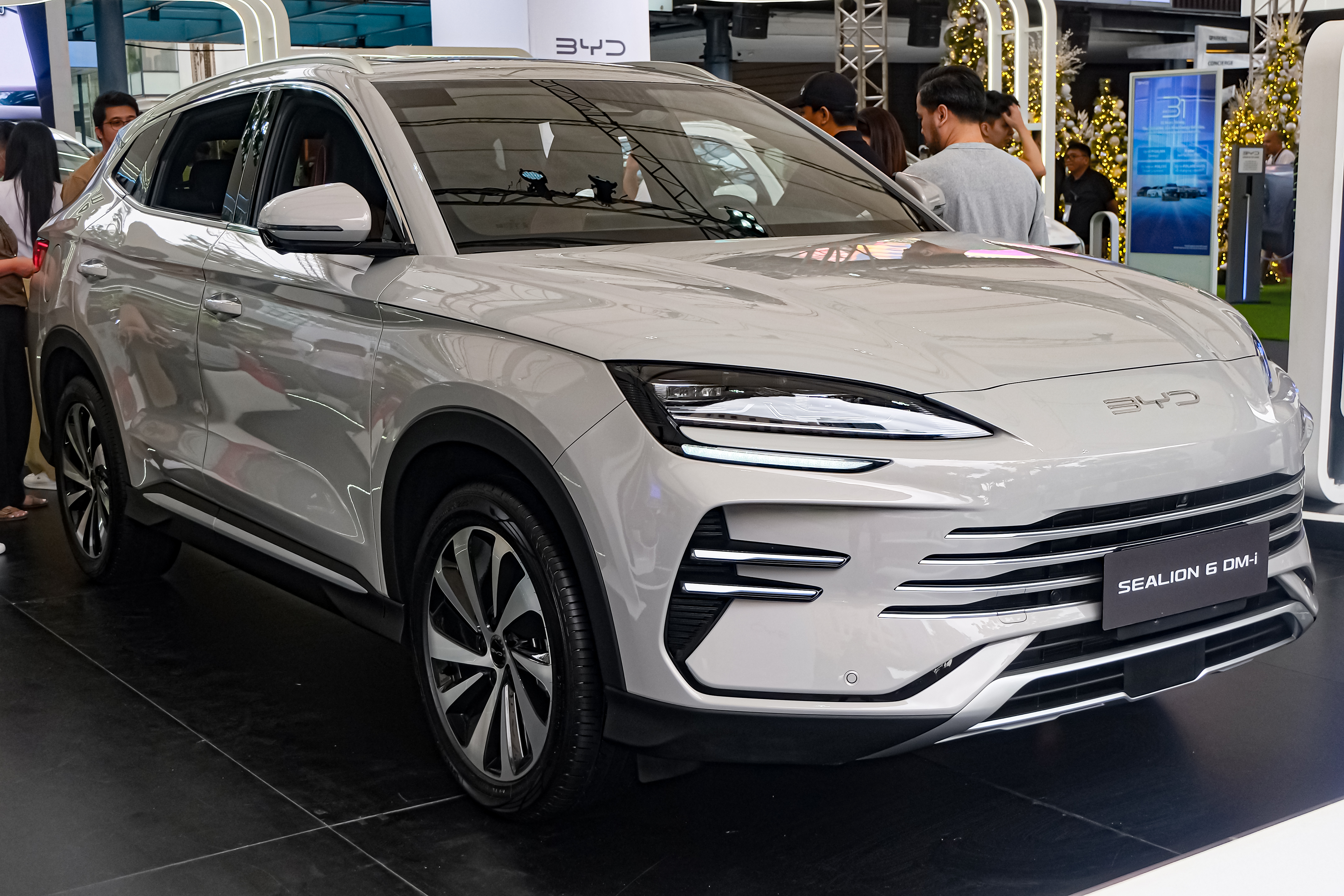
BYD Sealion 6

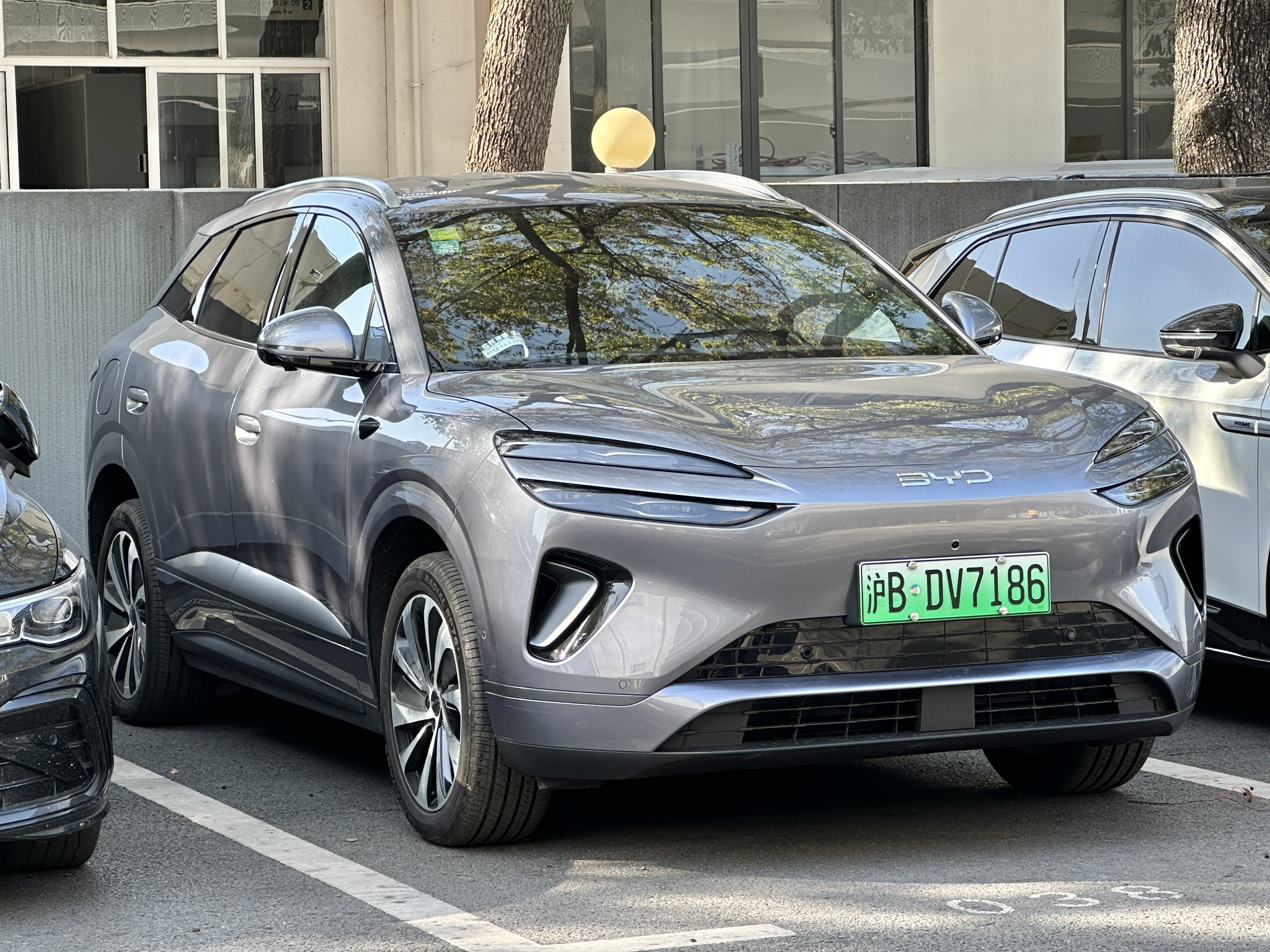
BYD Sealion 06

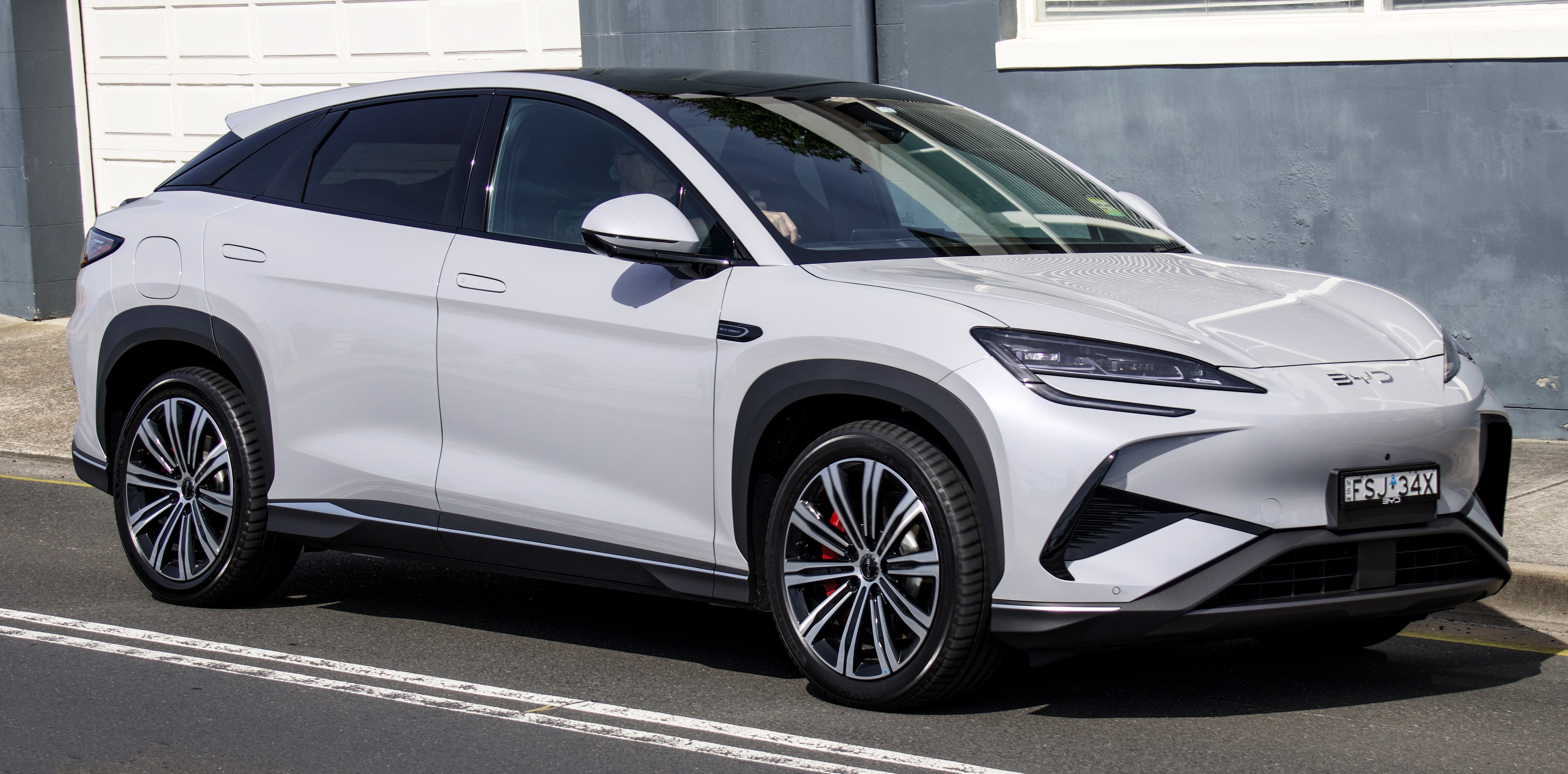
BYD Sealion 7

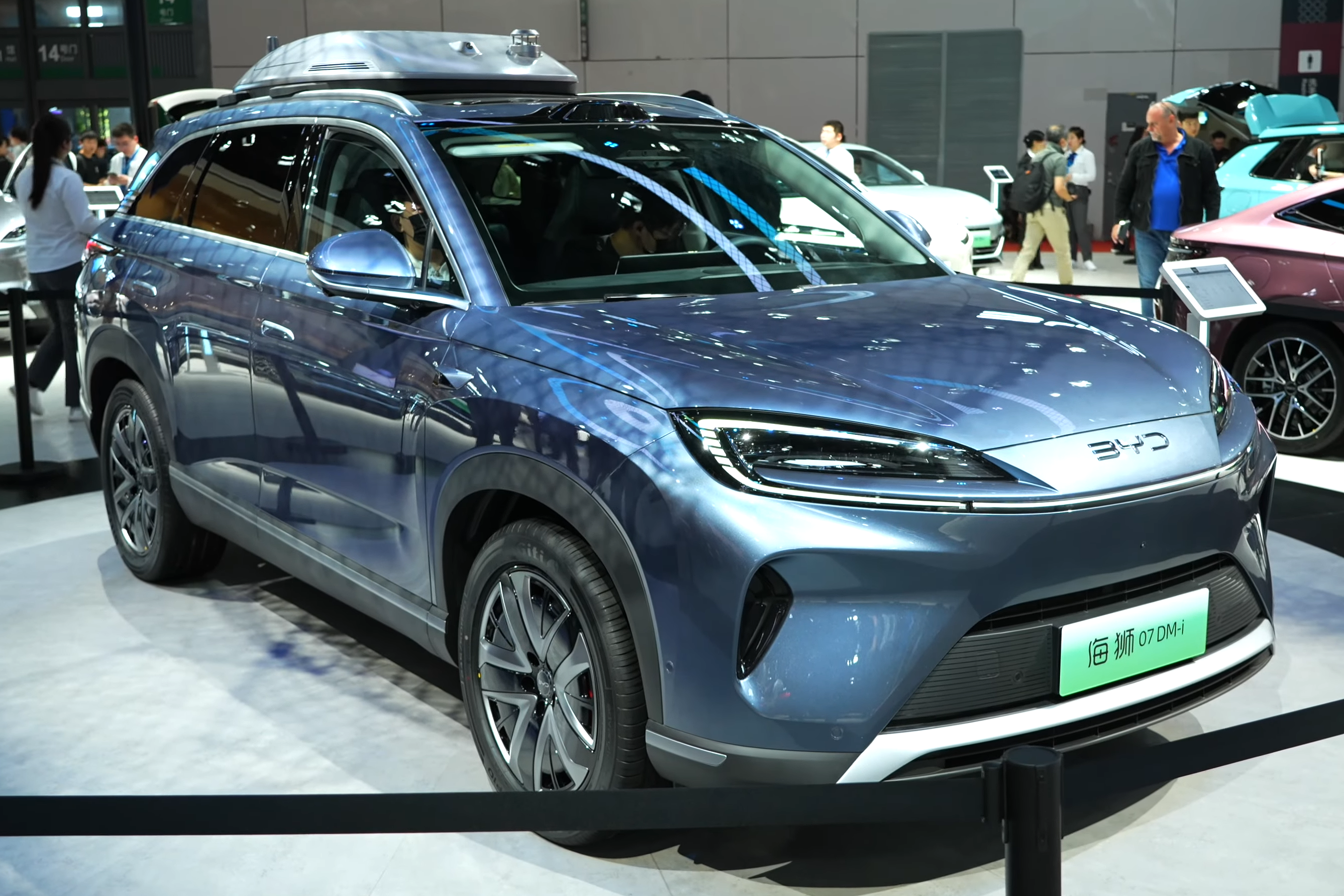
BYD Sealion 07 DM-i/DM-p

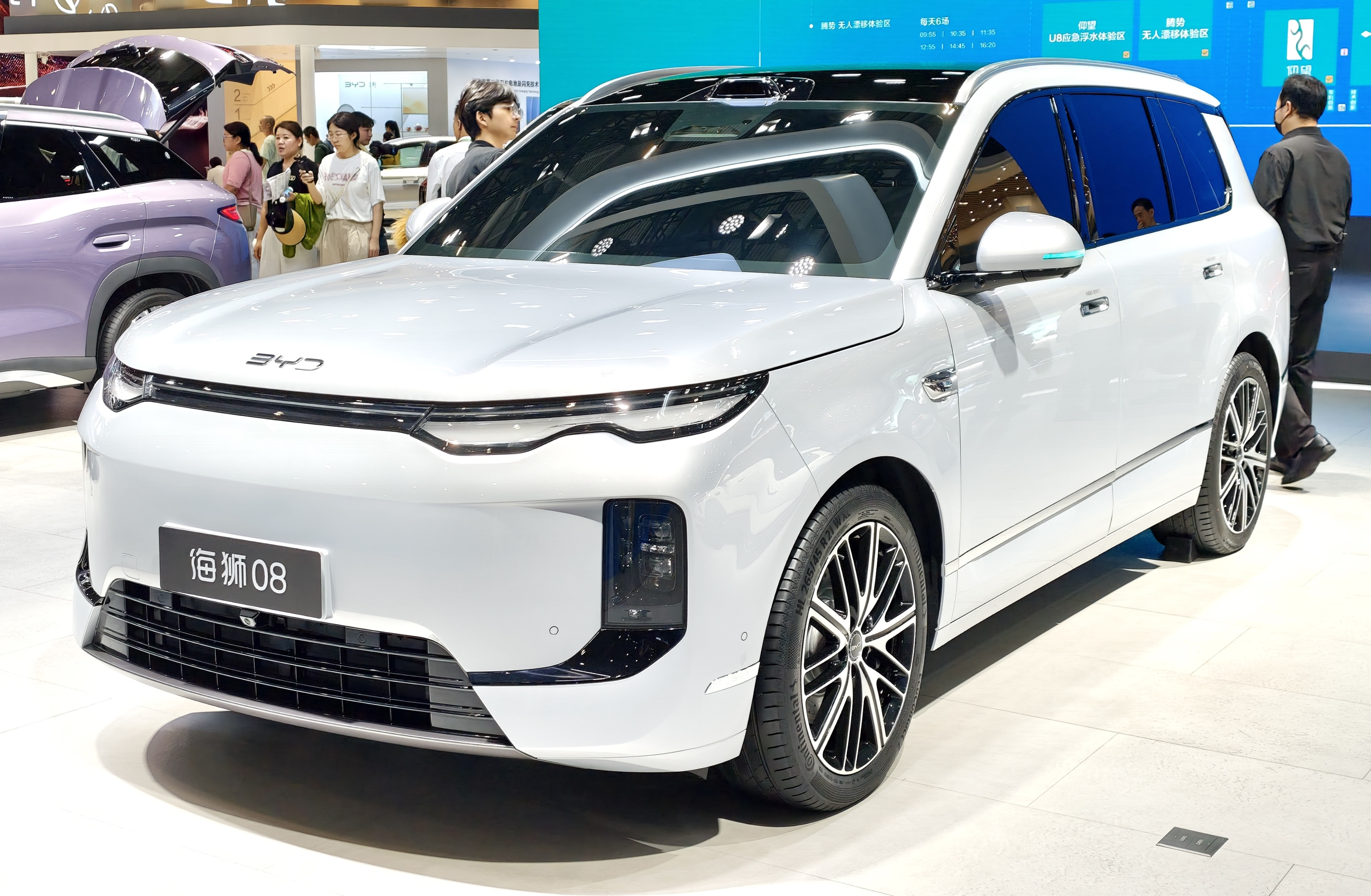
BYD Sealion 08

== See also ==
- List of vehicles named BYD Seal
- List of BYD Auto vehicles
