= BYD Sealion 05 DM-i =

Plug-in hybrid compact crossover SUV

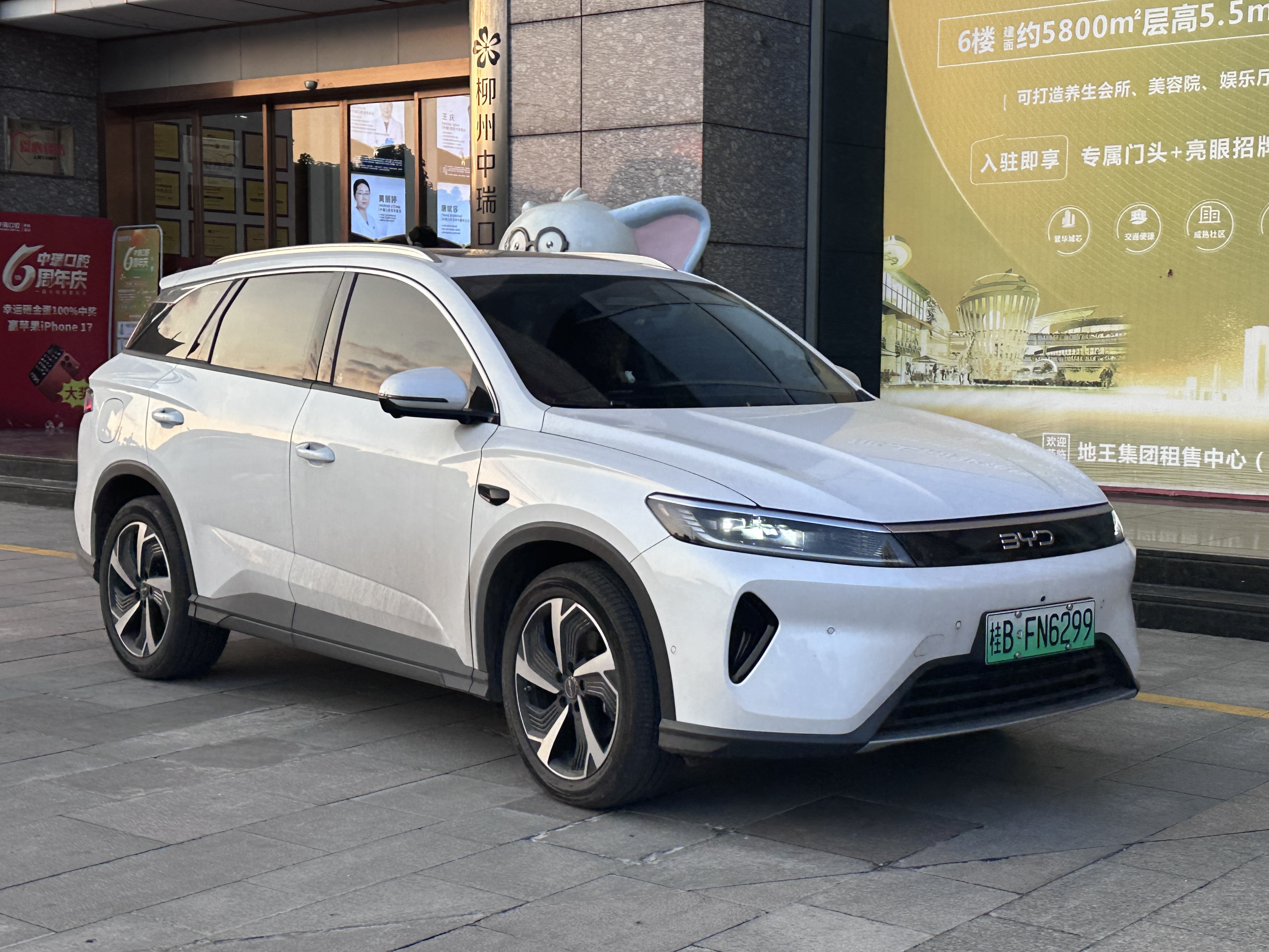

Overview
- Manufacturer: BYD Auto
- Production: 2024–present

Body and chassis
- Class: Compact SUV (C-segment)
- Body style: 5-door crossover SUV
- Layout: Front-engine, front-motor, front-wheel drive
- Platform: DM-i 5.0 platform

Powertrain
- Hybrid drivetrain: Plug-in hybrid

The BYD Sealion 05 DM-i (Chinese: 比亚迪海獅05 DM-i; pinyin: Bǐyǎdí Hǎishī 05 DM-i) is a plug-in hybrid compact SUV manufactured by BYD Auto since 2024. A sister model of the BYD Song Pro, the Sealion 05 DM-i is part of the "Sealion" (海狮; Hǎishī) line-up of SUVs under the Ocean Series product line-up that are distributed through Ocean Network dealerships in China.

== First generation (2024) ==
First generation
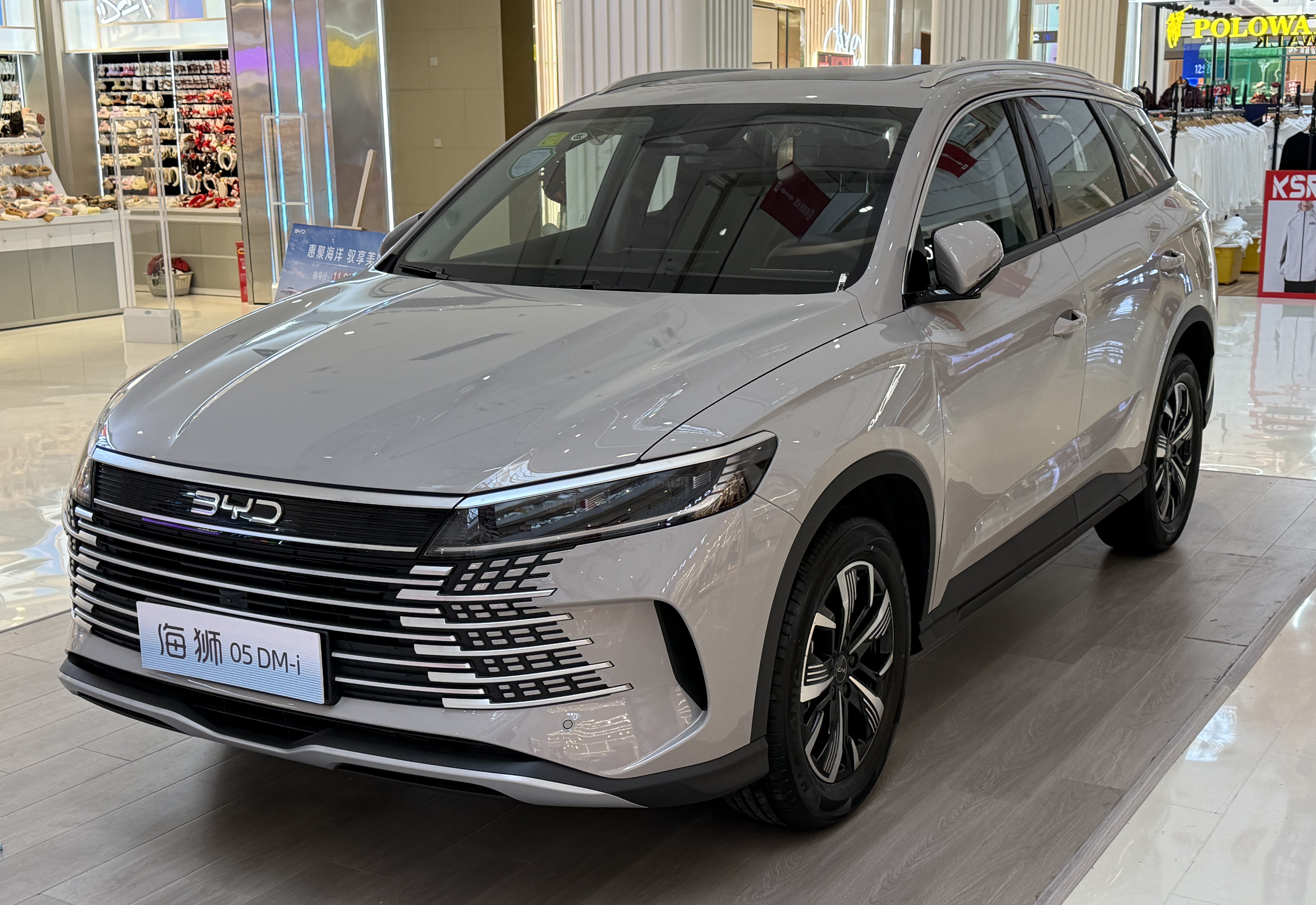

Overview
- Model code: SL2H
- Production: September 2024 – 2025
- Assembly: China: Xi'an, Shaanxi
- Designer: Under the lead of Wolfgang Egger

Body and chassis
- Platform: DM-i 5.0 platform
- Related: BYD Song Pro

Powertrain
- Engine: Petrol plug-in hybrid: 1.5 L BYD472QC I4 Atkinson cycle
- Electric motor: Permanent magnet synchronous
- Transmission: E-CVT
- Battery: 12.9 kWh BYD Blade LFP; 18.3 kWh BYD Blade LFP

Dimensions
- Wheelbase: 2,712 mm (106.8 in)
- Length: 4,710 mm (185.4 in)
- Width: 1,880 mm (74.0 in)
- Height: 1,720 mm (67.7 in)
- Curb weight: 1,635–1,765 kg (3,605–3,891 lb)

The first-generation BYD Sealion 05 DM-i was introduced and went on sale in September 2024 alongside the updated BYD Song Pro, a Dynasty Series model. The model is heavily based on the Song Pro sharing the same price and technical specifications. Its styling, which borrows heavily from the BYD Destroyer 05 sedan, was supposed to be adapted by the cancelled BYD Frigate 05 in 2022.

The Sealion 05 DM-i is equipped with BYD's fifth-generation plug-in hybrid system marketed as DM-i 5.0.

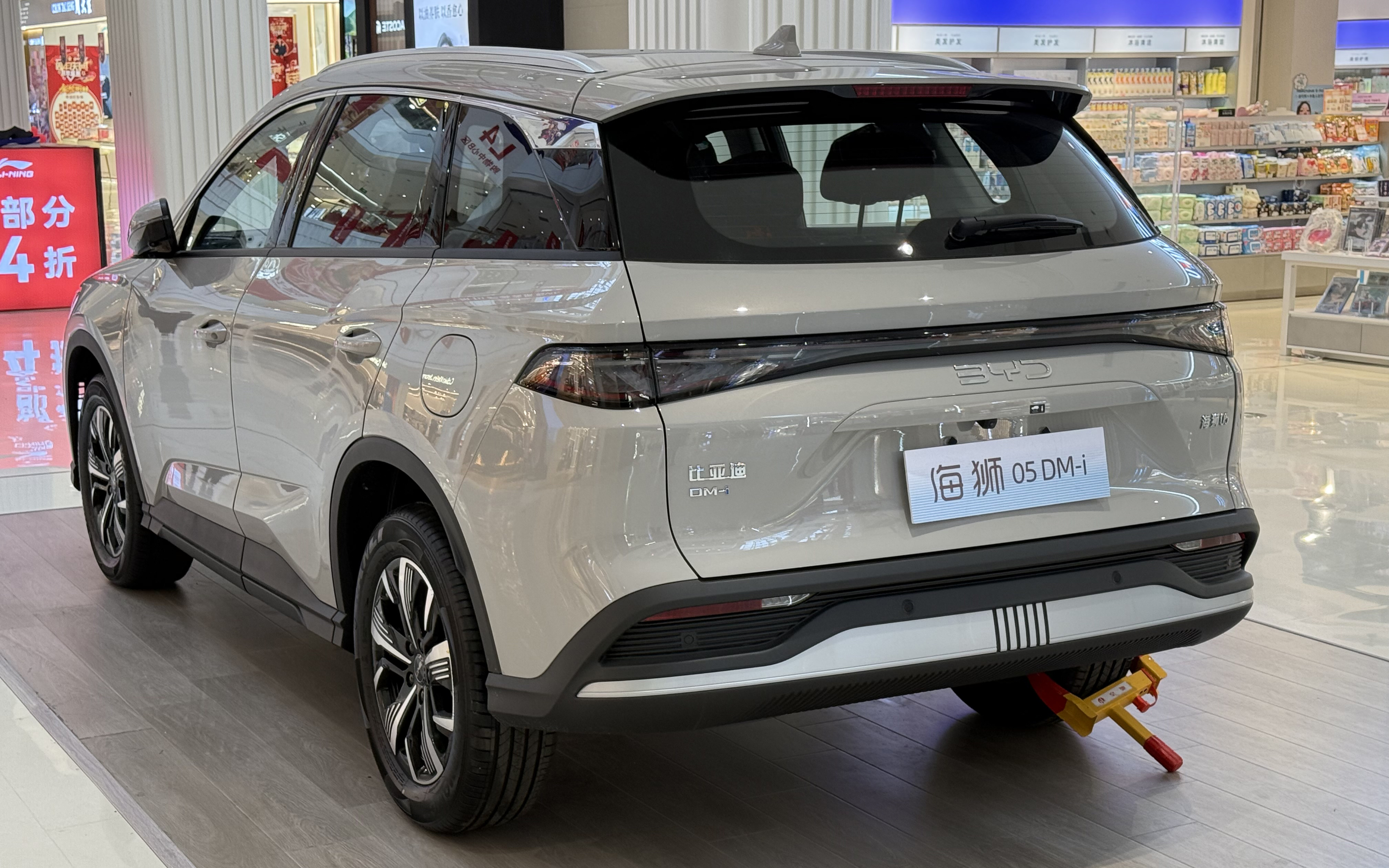
Rear view

=== 2025 facelift ===
The Sealion 05 DM-i was updated in February 2025, six months after its initial release. It received a revised front end design, and an upgraded advanced driver assistance system marketed as God's Eye C and DiPilot 100 that uses 12 cameras, 5 radars, 12 ultrasonic sensors, and an Nvidia chip.

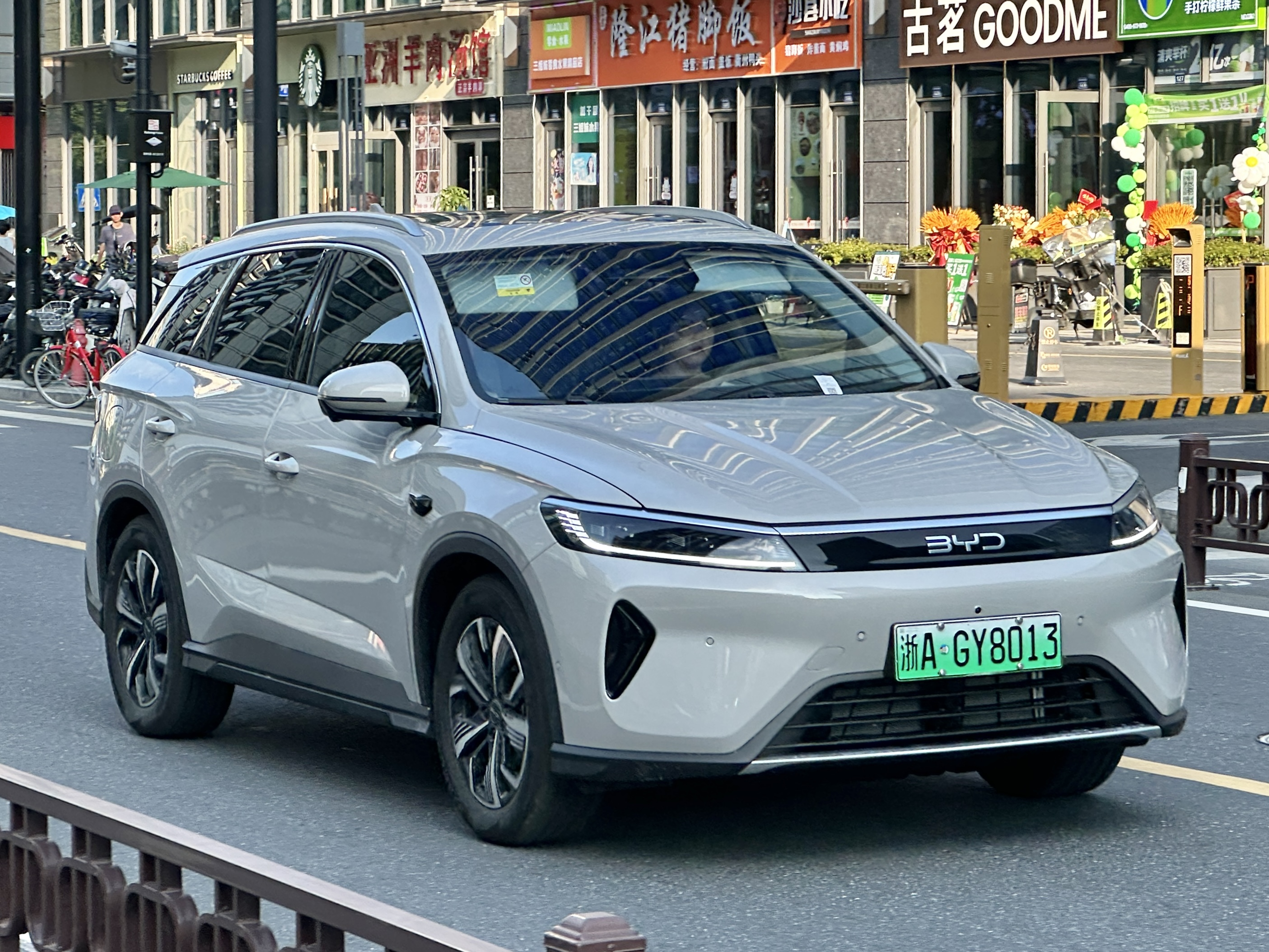
Front view

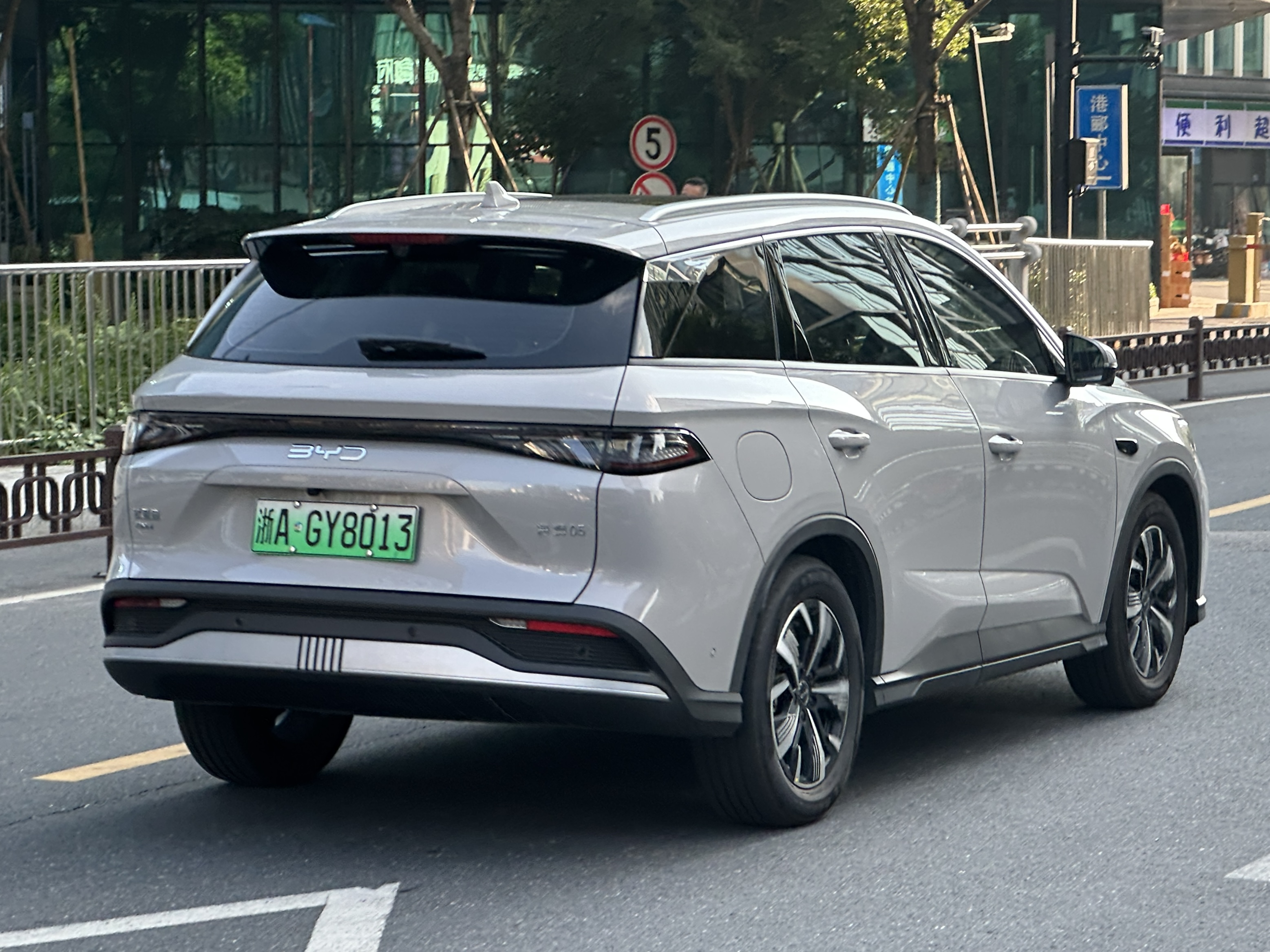
Rear view

=== Powertrain ===
Type	Engine			Trans.	Battery	Layout	Electric motor			0–100 km/h (0–62 mph) (claimed)	Electric range (claimed)		Calendar years
Type	Displ.	Power	Torque	Trans.	Battery	Layout	Type	Power	Torque	0–100 km/h (0–62 mph) (claimed)	CLTC	WLTC	Calendar years
1.5 L 75 km DM-i	BYD472QC 1,498 cc (1.5 L) I4	74 kW (99 hp)	126 N⋅m (12.8 kg⋅m; 92.9 lb⋅ft)	E-CVT	12.9 kWh LFP Blade	FWD	TZ210XYB PMSM	120 kW (161 hp)	210 N⋅m (21.4 kg⋅m; 155 lb⋅ft)	8.3 seconds	75 km (47 mi)	64 km (40 mi)	2024–2025
1.5 L 115 km DM-i	BYD472QC 1,498 cc (1.5 L) I4	74 kW (99 hp)	126 N⋅m (12.8 kg⋅m; 92.9 lb⋅ft)	E-CVT	18.3 kWh LFP Blade	FWD	TZ210XYB PMSM	120 kW (161 hp)	210 N⋅m (21.4 kg⋅m; 155 lb⋅ft)	8.5 seconds	115 km (71 mi)	93 km (58 mi)	2024–2025

=== Safety ===
ANCAP test results BYD Sealion 5 (2026, aligned with Euro NCAP)
Test	Score
Overall:	3 /5 stars
Safe driving	48%
Crash avoidance	51%
Crash protection	79%
Post crash	74%

== Second generation (2026) ==
The second-generation BYD Sealion 05 DM-i was introduced in April 2026. using the same body design as the BYD Sealion 05 EV. Sales of the Sealion 05 DM-i began on 20 April 2026.

== Sales ==
Year	China
2024	14,261
2025	30,325

== See also ==
- List of BYD Auto vehicles
