= BYD Sealion 07 DM =

Plug-in hybrid mid-size crossover SUV

BYD Sealion 07 DM-i
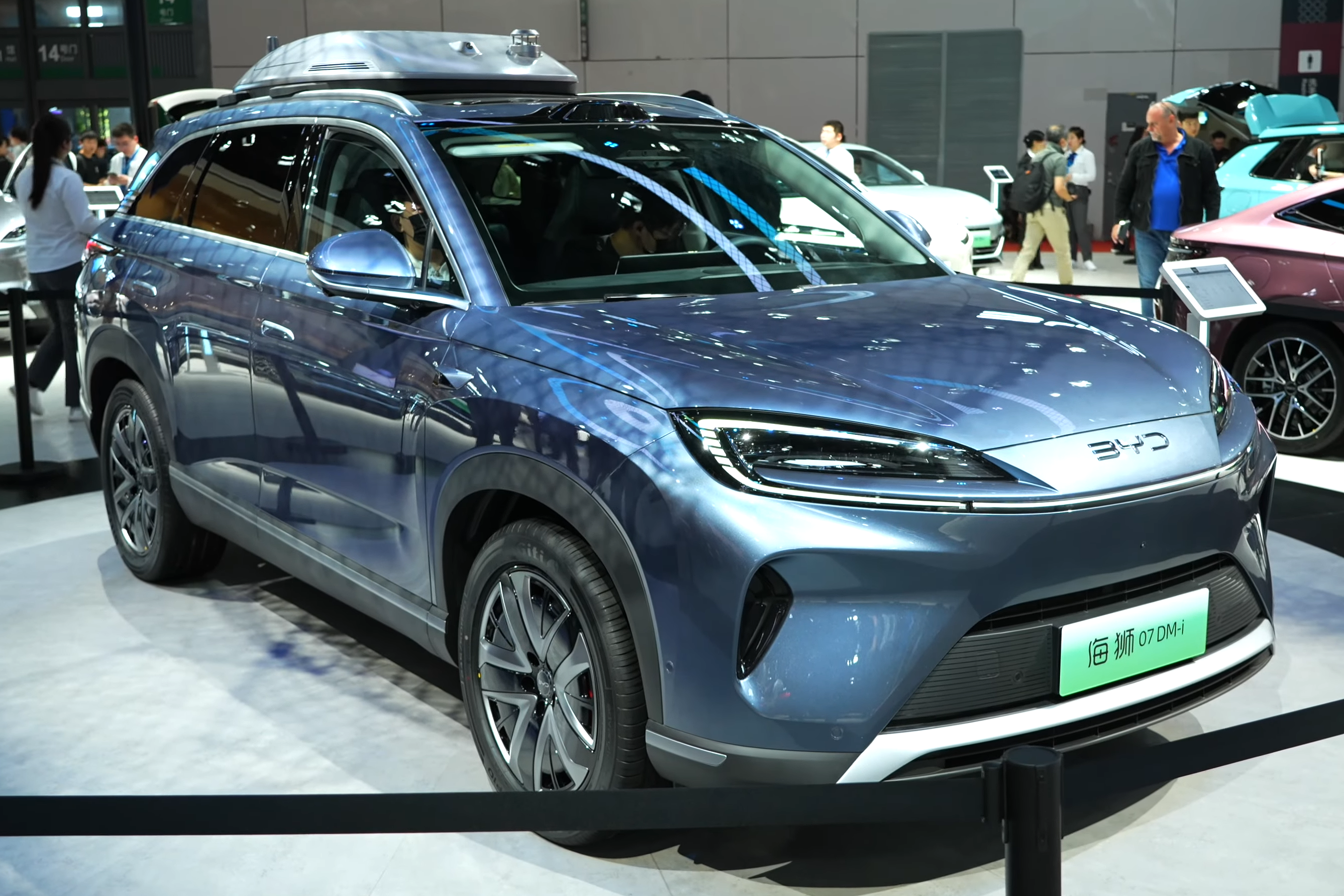

Overview
- Manufacturer: BYD Auto
- Production: March 2025 – 2026
- Assembly: China: Xi'an, Shaanxi
- Designer: Under the lead of Wolfgang Egger

Body and chassis
- Class: Mid-size SUV (D-segment)
- Body style: 5-door crossover SUV
- Layout: Front-engine, front-motor, front-wheel drive; Front-engine, dual-motor, all-wheel-drive
- Platform: DM-i 5.0 platform
- Chassis: Unibody
- Related: BYD Frigate 07; BYD Tang (second generation); Denza X/N8

Powertrain
- Engine: Petrol plug-in hybrid: 1.5 L BYD472ZQB I4 turbo
- Electric motor: Permanent magnet synchronous
- Transmission: E-CVT
- Hybrid drivetrain: Plug-in hybrid
- Battery: BYD Blade LFP

Dimensions
- Wheelbase: 2,820 mm (111.0 in)
- Length: 4,880 mm (192.1 in)
- Width: 1,920 mm (75.6 in)
- Height: 1,750 mm (68.9 in)
- Curb weight: 2,103–2,346 kg (4,636–5,172 lb)

Chronology
- Predecessor: BYD Frigate 07

The BYD Sealion 07 DM-i (Chinese: 比亚迪海狮07 DM-i; pinyin: Bǐyǎdí Hǎishī 07 DM-i) is a plug-in hybrid mid-size SUV manufactured by BYD Auto since 2025. Part of the Sealion (海狮; Hǎishī) family of SUVs, it is a restyled and updated version of the BYD Frigate 07, both part of the Ocean Series product line-up that are distributed through Ocean Network dealerships.

== Overview ==
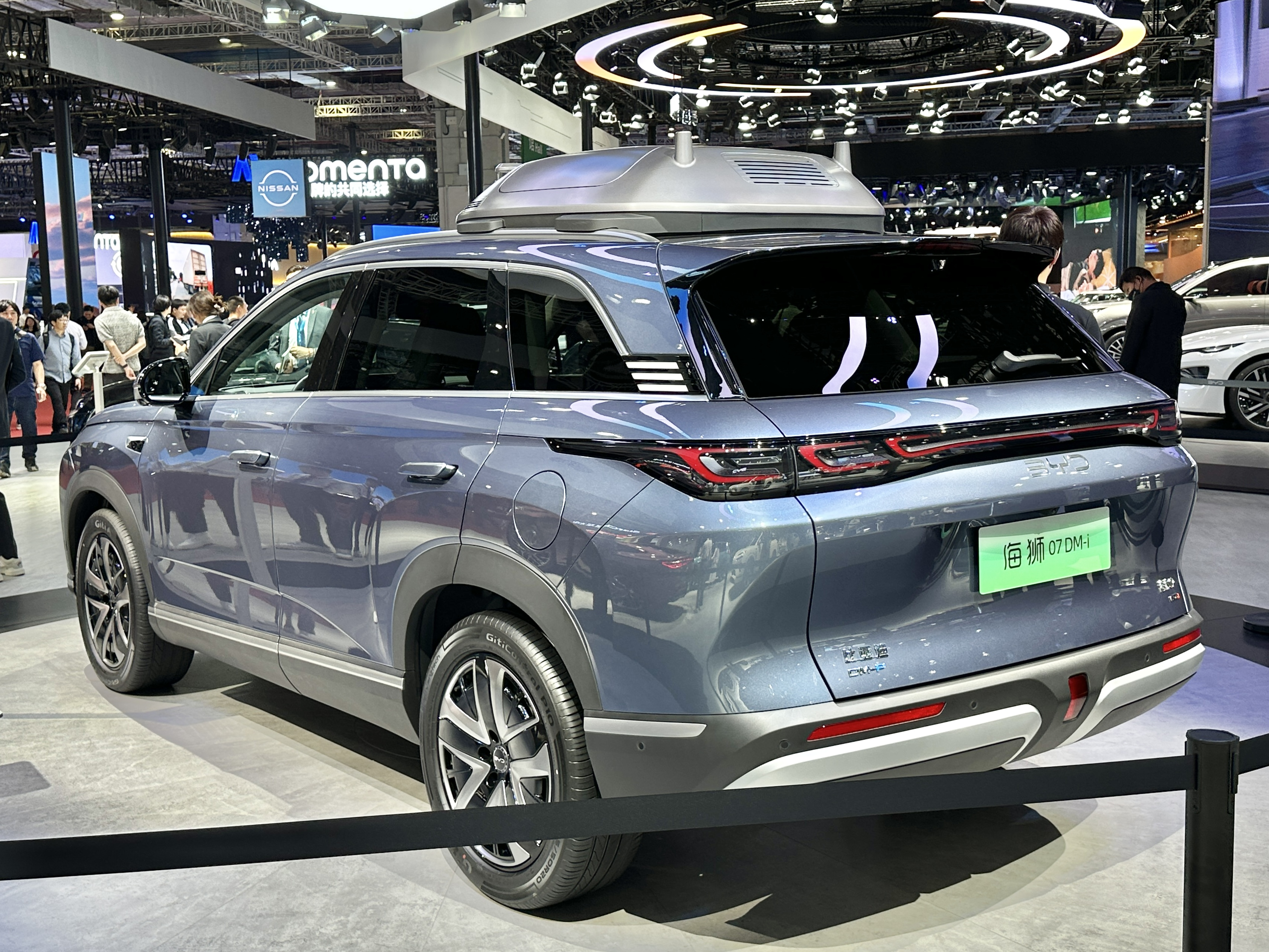
BYD Sealion 07 DM-i rear

The Sealion 07 DM-i debuted in March 2025. It adopts BYD's fifth-generation plug-in hybrid system. It is available with an optional Lingyuan roof-mounted aerial drone hangar system co-developed with DJI.

Built on the e-platform 3.0 and powered by BYD’s fifth-generation DM (Dual Mode) plug-in hybrid system. The DM-i variant prioritizes fuel economy and electric range, while the DM-p model emphasizes performance with dual motors and all-wheel drive capabilities.

The Sealion 07 features an evolved Ocean X design language along LED lighting, a streamlined profile, and aerodynamic accents. Inside, the cabin boasts a tech-forward environment with a rotating 15.6-inch infotainment screen, DiPilot intelligent driving assistance system, and ergonomic seats inspired by oceanic forms.

== Sales ==
Year	China
2025	6,287

== See also ==
- List of BYD Auto vehicles
