= BYD Frigate 07 =

Plug-in hybrid mid-size crossover SUV

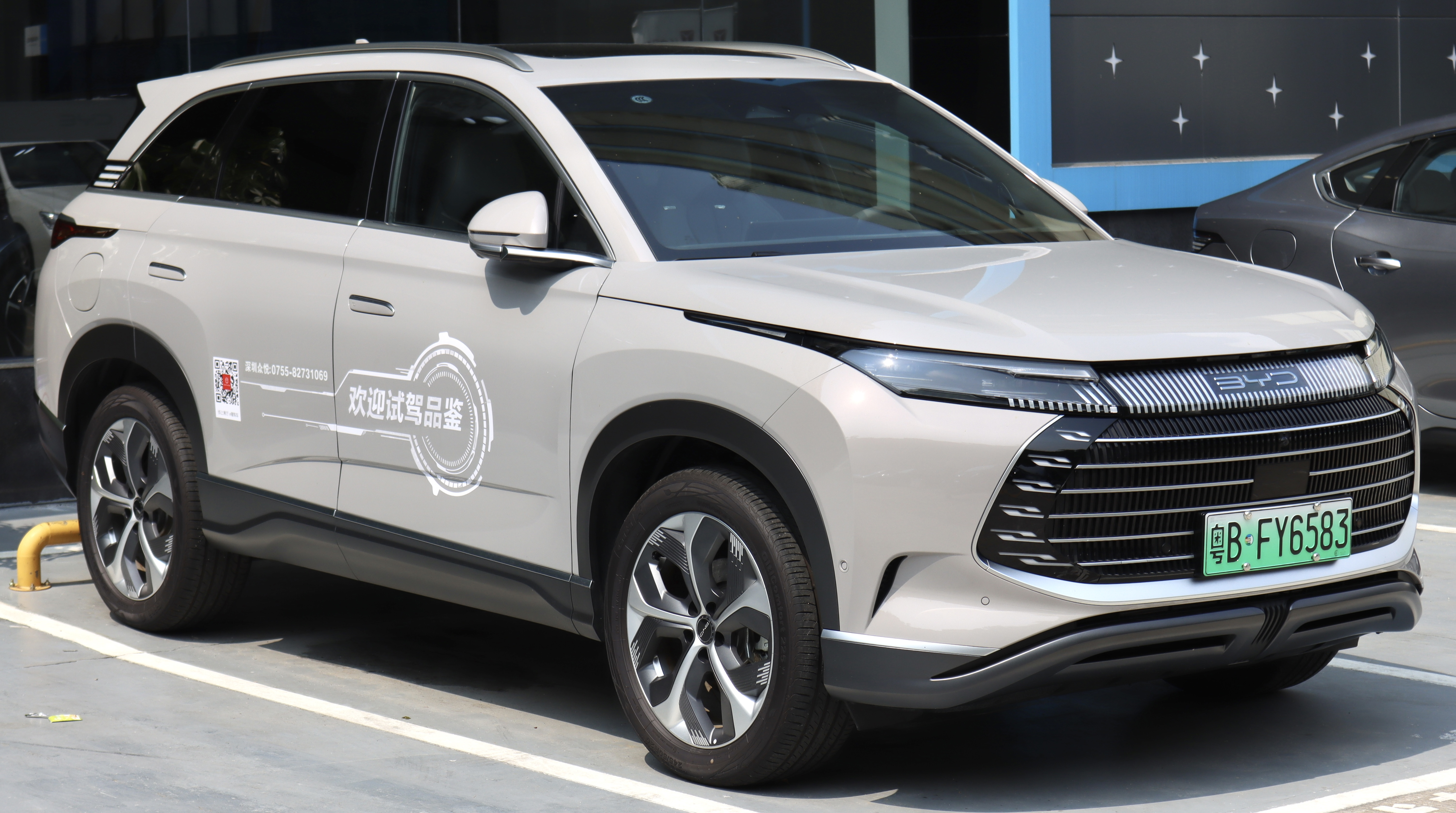

Overview
- Manufacturer: BYD Auto
- Production: October 2022 – 2025
- Assembly: China: Xi'an, Shaanxi
- Designer: Under the lead of Wolfgang Egger

Body and chassis
- Class: Mid-size SUV
- Body style: 5-door crossover SUV
- Layout: Front-engine, front-wheel-drive; Front-engine, all-wheel-drive
- Related: BYD Tang (second generation); BYD Sealion 07 DM; Denza X/N8

Powertrain
- Engine: Petrol PHEV: 1.5 L BYD476ZQA DM-i I4 turbo
- Electric motor: Front-wheel-drive (FWD): 1×1XM AC permanent magnet synchronous; All-wheel-drive (AWD): 2×1YM AC permanent magnet synchronous
- Power output: 102 kW (137 hp; 139 PS) (engine); 43 kW (58 hp; 58 PS) (electric motor, FWD); 193 kW (259 hp; 262 PS) (electric motor, AWD); 145 kW (194 hp; 197 PS) (combined, FWD); 295 kW (396 hp; 401 PS) (combined, AWD)
- Transmission: E-CVT
- Hybrid drivetrain: Plug-in hybrid
- Battery: Li-ion (DM-i/ DM-p Super Hybrid special power type Blade battery): 18.3-36.8 kWh
- Range: 1,200 km (750 mi)
- Electric range: 100–205 km (62–127 mi)
- Plug-in charging: 3.3 kW AC, 40 kW DC (FWD); 6.6 kW AC, 75 kW DC (AWD)

Dimensions
- Wheelbase: 2,820 mm (111.0 in)
- Length: 4,820 mm (189.8 in)
- Width: 1,920 mm (75.6 in)
- Height: 1,750 mm (68.9 in)
- Curb weight: 2,047–2,270 kg (4,513–5,004 lb)

Chronology
- Successor: BYD Sealion 07 DM-i/DM-p

The BYD Frigate 07 (Chinese: 比亚迪护卫舰07; pinyin: Bǐyǎdí Hùwèijiàn 07), also translated in English sources as the BYD Corvette 07 is a plug-in hybrid mid-size SUV manufactured by Chinese automaker BYD Auto. The second plug-in hybrid electric vehicle (PHEV) of BYD's new "Ocean Series" of plug-in electric vehicles, the Frigate 07 is equipped with the DM-i hybrid technology, and the additional DM-p performance oriented hybrid technology from the PHEVs of the BYD Dynasty series.

== Overview ==
First previewed by the BYD X Dream concept car at the Shanghai Auto Show on April 20, 2021, the production version of the Frigate 07 was unveiled at the Chengdu Auto Show in August 2022, with the market launch held in December 2022. It is the second vehicle of BYD's 'Warship' series, which comprises PHEVs from the 'Ocean' series.

Charging the Frigate 07 can be done either through a normal household AC plug at 3.3 kW and the all wheel drive version supports a faster 6.6 kW AC charging. All versions of the Frigate 07 support DC fast charging at either 40 kW or 75 kW respectively. The Vehicle-to-Load is supported by all versions of the Frigate 07 and offers up to 6.6 kW.

The interior of the Frigate 07 is equipped with a 15.6 inches (400 mm) rotating main screen, 360-degree HD cameras, and app-controlled autonomous parking. Just like the one on the Destroyer 05, The 15.6 inch main touch screen can rotate from landscape to portrait.

The Frigate 07 supports the iPhone NFC digital key and also comes with the DiPilot intelligent driving assistance system that provides users with advanced driving-assisting functions including active braking, maintaining lanes, adaptive cruise control, and pedestrian recognition and protection. The Frigate 07 is also the first model from BYD to be equipped with the FSD frequency variable damping dampers and four-link independent rear suspensions.

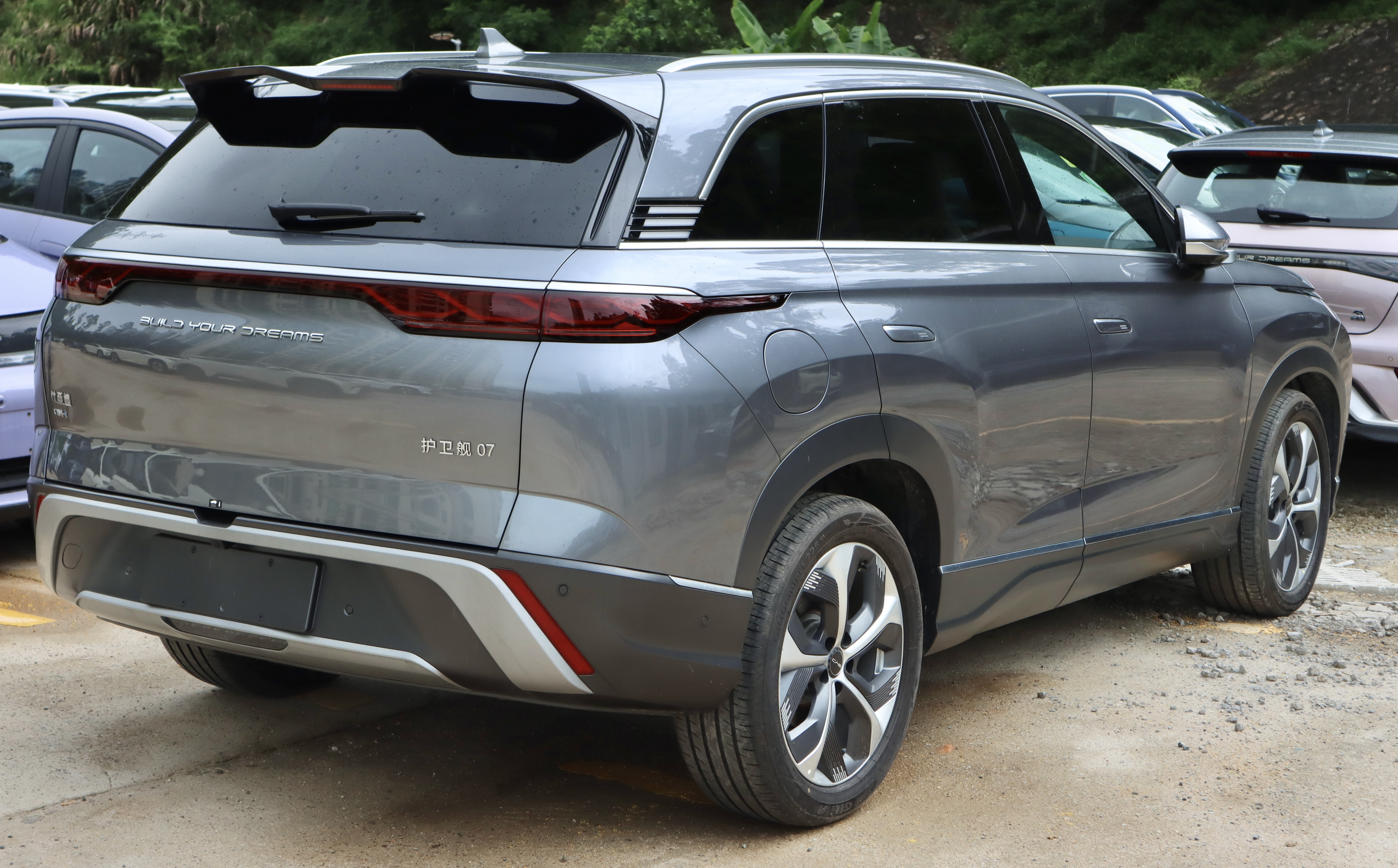
Rear view

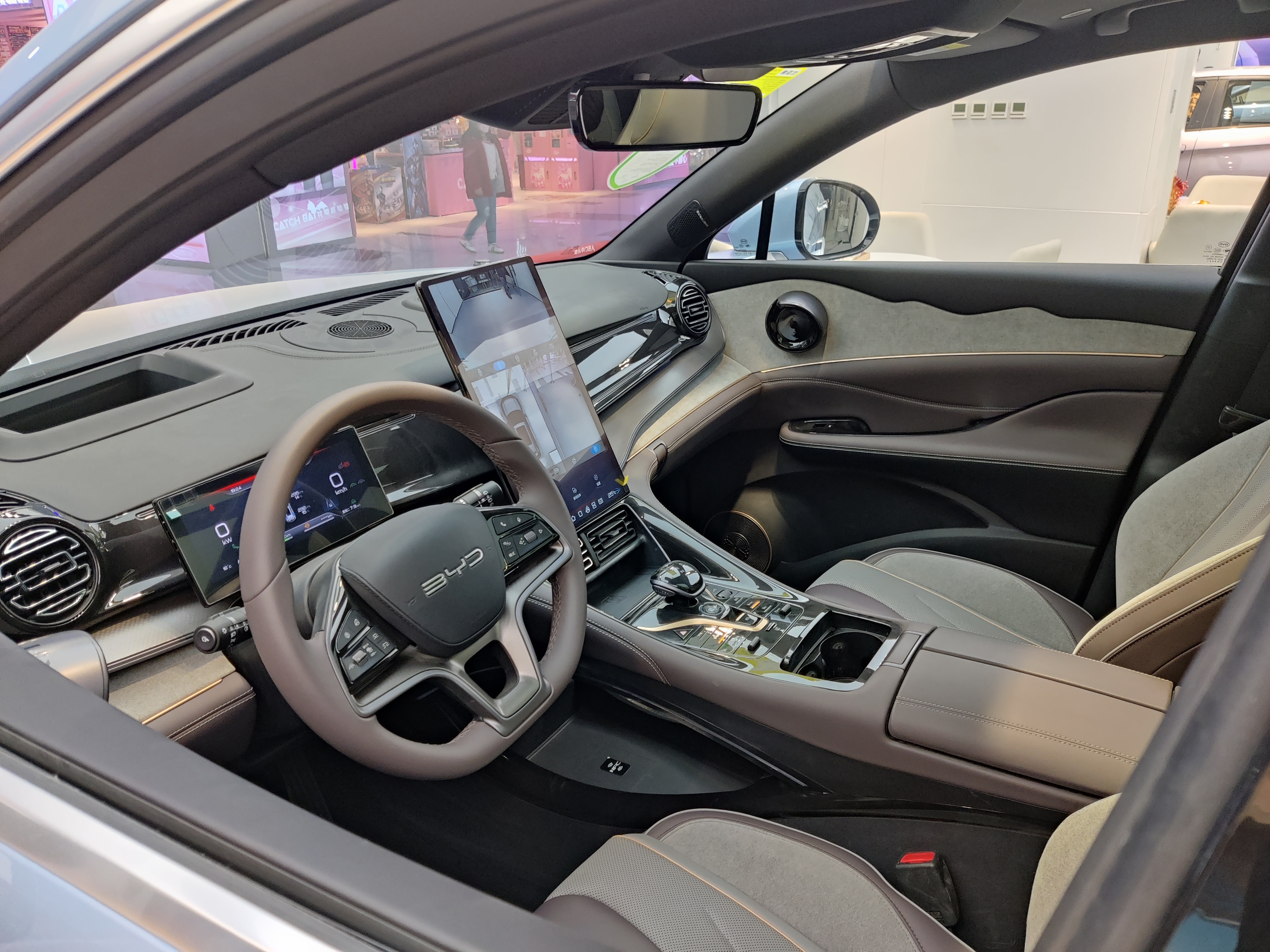
Interior

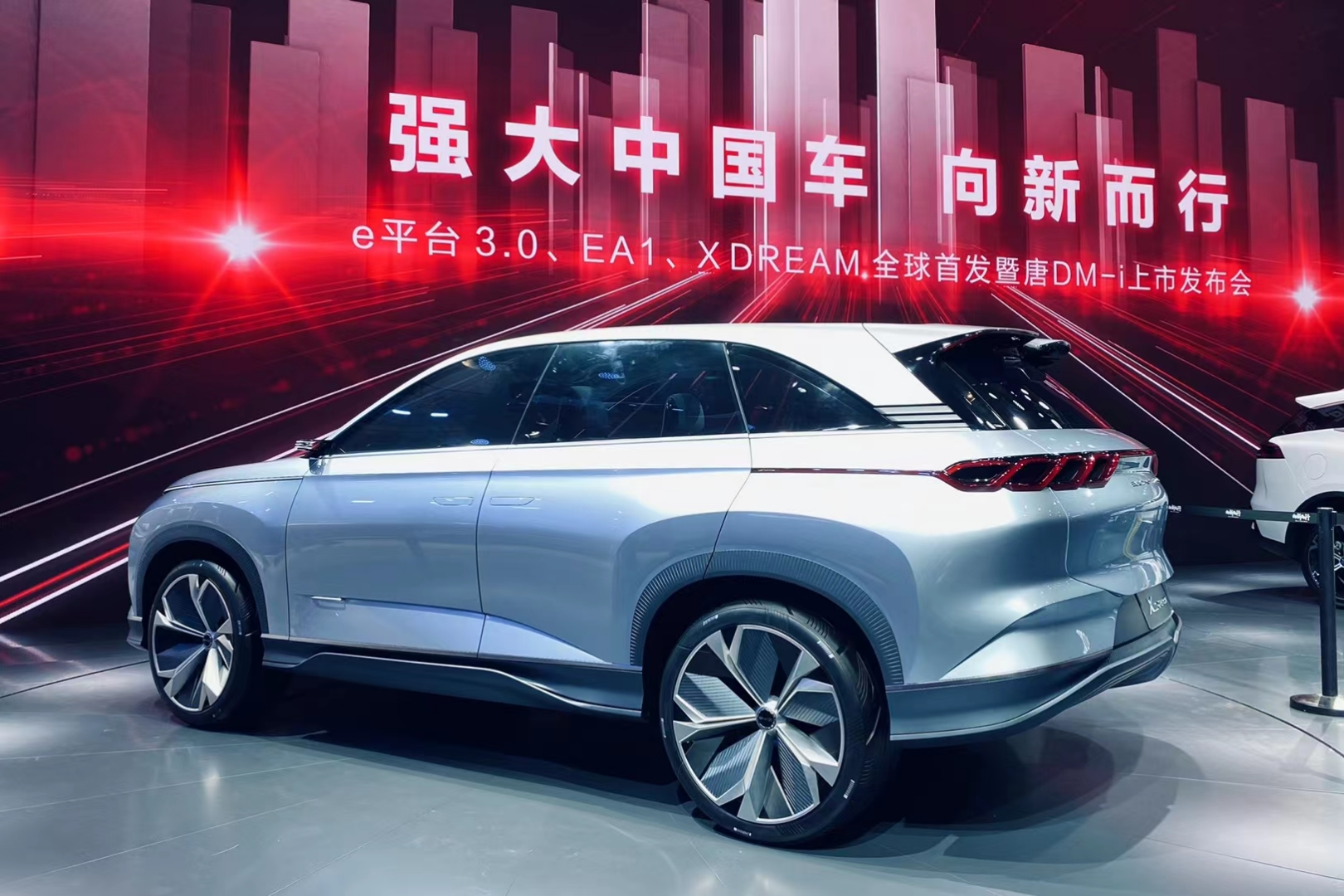
BYD X Dream Concept

== Powertrain ==
The BYD Frigate 07 is powered by BYD's DM-i and DM-p hybrid EHS system (Electric Hybrid System) in two variants with two battery sizes respectively. Both DM-i and DM-p versions are fitted with a 102-kilowatt (137 hp; 139 PS) and 231-newton-metre (24 kg⋅m; 170 lb⋅ft) 1.5-litre turbo-charged Xiaoyun Miller cycle petrol engine producing 81 kW (109 hp; 110 PS) and a 60-litre (13 imp gal; 16 US gal) fuel tank giving the car a combined range of over 1,200 kilometres (746 mi) and a fuel economy of 5.5 litres per 100 kilometres (18.2 km/L; 51.4 mpg_{‑imp}; 42.8 mpg_{‑US}). The all wheel drive dual motor DM-p version focuses on performance and has a 36.8-kilowatt-hour (132 MJ) Blade lithium iron phosphate battery capable of an electric-only range of 170 kilometres (106 mi) (WLTC), powering two electric motors resulting in a combined output of 295 kW (396 hp; 401 PS) with 656 N⋅m (67 kg⋅m; 484 lb⋅ft) of torque, while the front wheel drive DM-i version focuses on fuel economy and is equipped with a 18.3-kilowatt-hour (66 MJ) Blade lithium iron phosphate battery which is good enough for 82 kilometres (51 mi) (WLTC) of pure electric driving range powering a single electric motor with an output of 145 kW (194 hp; 197 PS) and 316 N⋅m (32 kg⋅m; 233 lb⋅ft) of torque. The all wheel drive DM-p version has a 0 to 100 km/h (0 to 62 mph) acceleration time of 4.7 seconds, while the front wheel drive DM-i model accelerates from 0 to 100 km/h (0 to 62 mph) in 8.5 seconds.

== Sales ==
Year	China
2022	1,805
2023	66,262
2024	11,400
2025	802

== See also ==
- List of BYD Auto vehicles
