= BYD Tang =

Mid-size crossover SUV

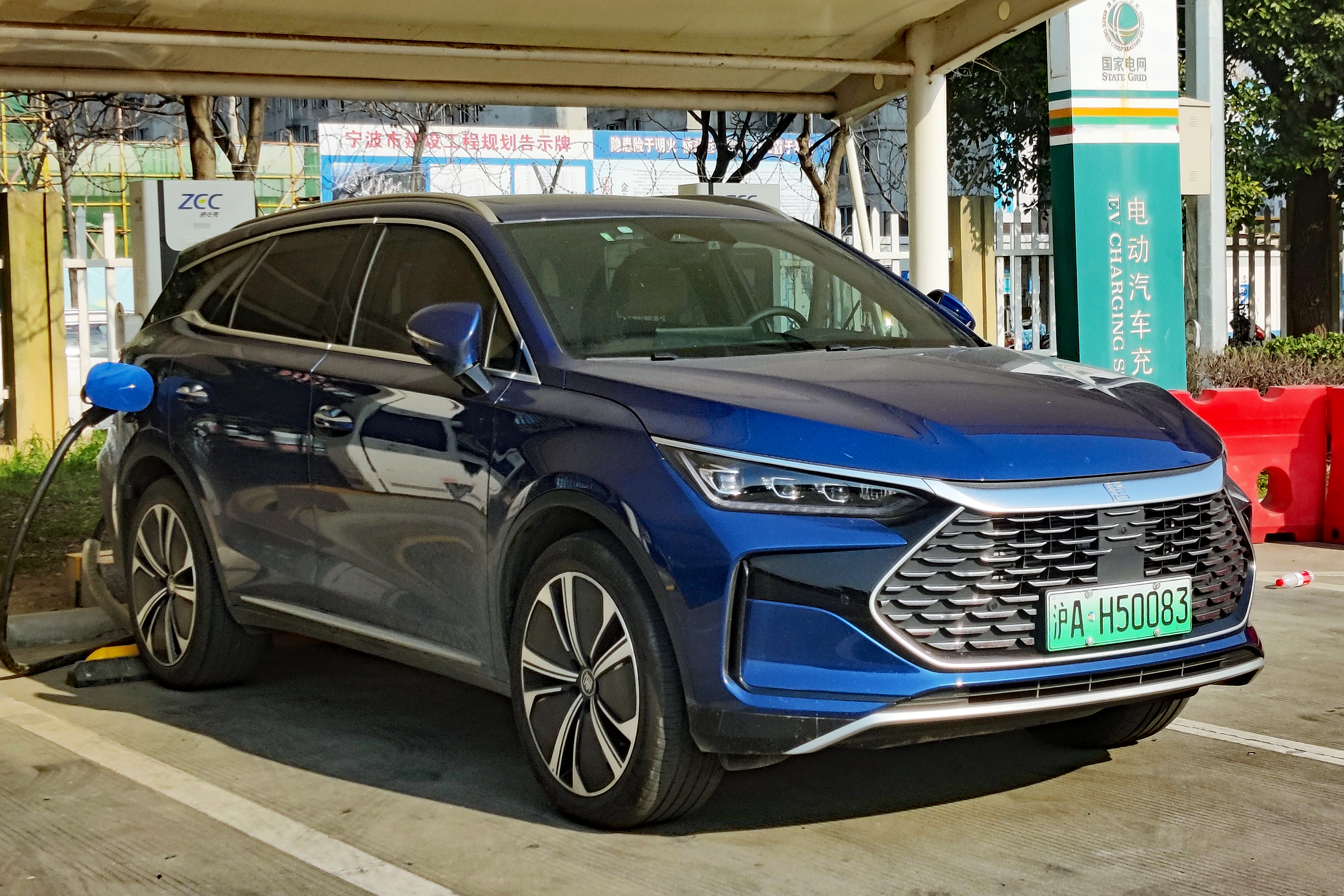
- BYD Tang DM-p

Overview
- Manufacturer: BYD Auto
- Production: 2015–present

Body and chassis
- Class: Mid-size SUV (E-segment)
- Body style: 5-door crossover SUV

Chronology
- Predecessor: BYD S6/S7

The BYD Tang (Chinese: 比亚迪唐) is a series of mid-size SUV manufactured by BYD Auto, available as a battery electric, a plug-in hybrid or formerly a conventional ICE vehicle. The vehicle is the second model of BYD's "Dynasty" series passenger vehicles after the Qin, and gets its name from the Tang dynasty, the most prosperous of all the great Chinese dynasties.

The first-generation BYD Tang was introduced at the 2014 Beijing Auto Show and was available as a plug-in hybrid only. Retail deliveries began in China in June 2015.

The second-generation BYD Tang debuted at Auto China in April 2018. The battery electric variant went on sale in Europe (in Norway) in 2021.

== First generation (2015) ==
First generation
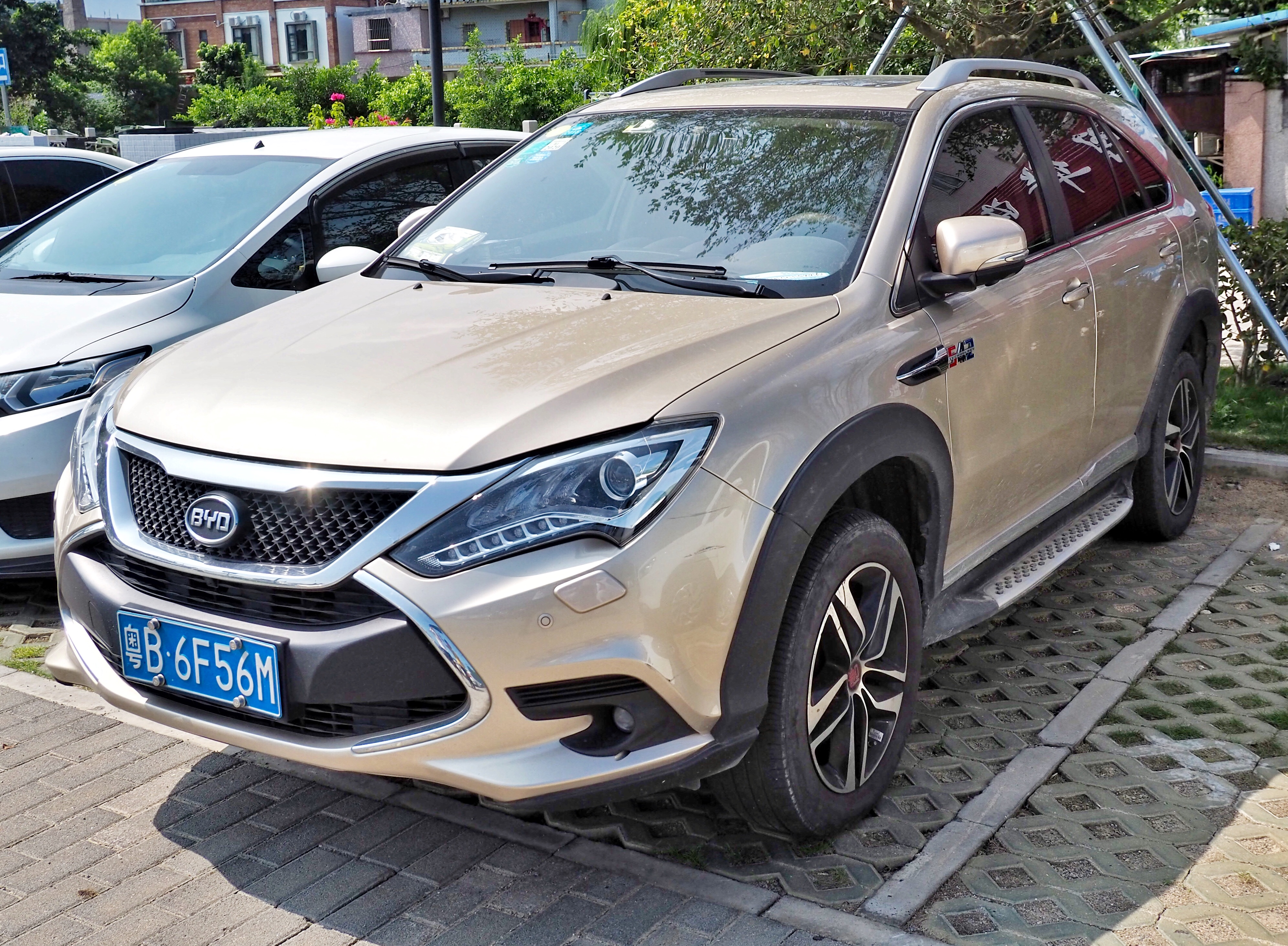

Overview
- Production: 2015–2018

Body and chassis
- Layout: Front-engine, front-wheel-drive
- Related: BYD S6

Powertrain
- Engine: 2.0 L BYD487ZQA I4 turbo petrol
- Electric motor: 2×110 kW
- Battery: 18.4 kWh LFP
- Electric range: 80 km (50 mi)

Dimensions
- Wheelbase: 2,720 mm (107.1 in)
- Length: 4,815 mm (189.6 in)
- Width: 1,855 mm (73.0 in)
- Height: 1,720 mm (67.7 in)

The first-generation BYD Tang is a plug-in hybrid SUV based on the BYD S6. Its 18.4 kWh lithium iron phosphate battery pack delivers an all-electric range of 80 km (50 mi). The Tang was introduced at the 2014 Beijing Auto Show and was produced to at least 2018.

The first-generation Tang was the top selling plug-in electric passenger car in China in 2016, and the world's top selling plug-in hybrid in 2016. Also, the Tang ranked as the world's third best-selling plug-in car that year.

=== Specifications ===
The Tang is powered by a 2.0-litre internal combustion engine which delivers 151 kW (202 hp) and 320 N⋅m (236 lbf⋅ft) of torque; and two electric motors, front and rear, each rated at 110 kW (148 hp) and 250 N⋅m (184 lbf⋅ft) in the entry-level Tang, and 300 N⋅m (221 lbf⋅ft) in the performance model. Total system output is 371 kW (498 hp) and 820 N⋅m (605 lbf⋅ft) for the entry-level model, and 411 kW (551 hp) and 870 N⋅m (642 lbf⋅ft) for the concept performance model. The latter accelerates from 0 to 100 km/h (62 mph) in 4.5 seconds and the entry level in 4.9 seconds. The Tang is fitted with BYD's second generation Dual Mode (DM) system which allows drivers to switch between all-electric mode (EV mode) and hybrid electric mode (HEV mode). This vehicle is an electric version of the BYD S6.

=== Tang 100 ===
On 27 February 2017, The BYD Tang 100 was officially launched in Shenzhen, China. the Tang 100 is equipped with a high-density safety battery and a battery management system, and its pure electric range is 100 kilometers.

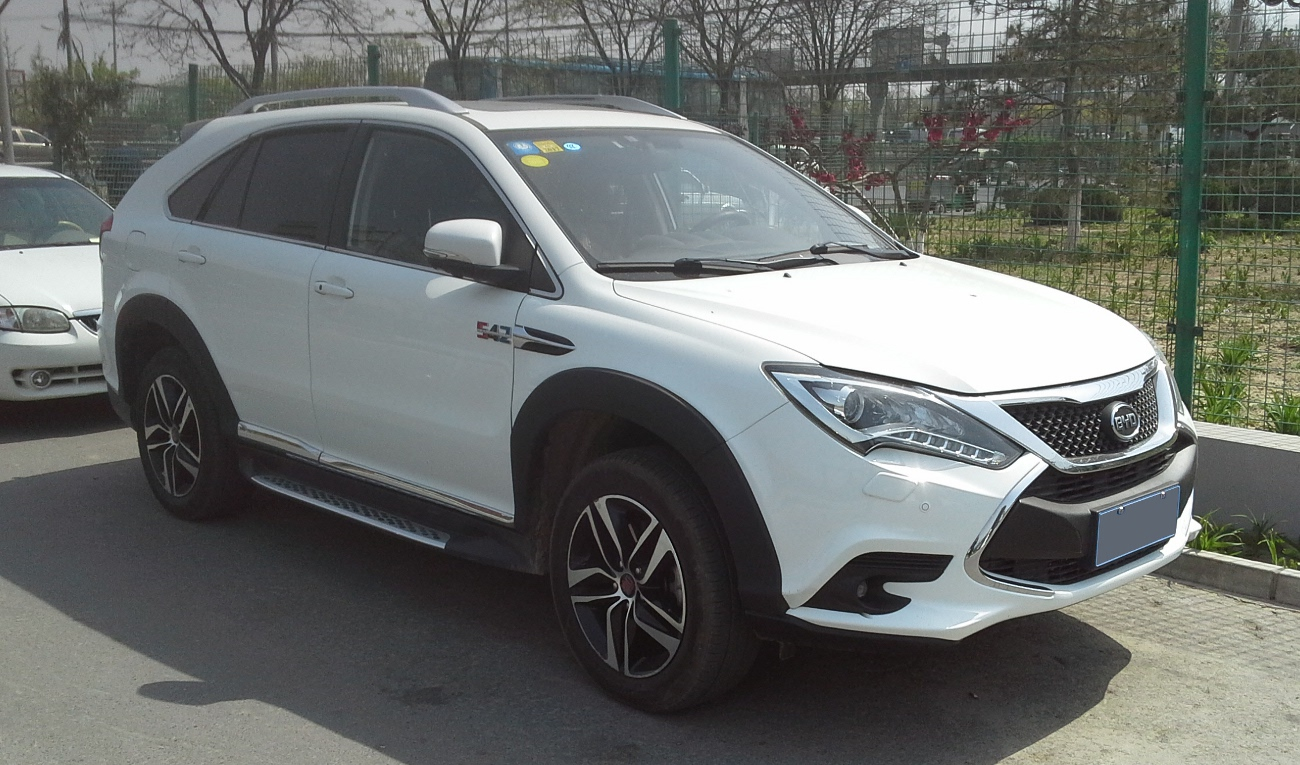
Front view

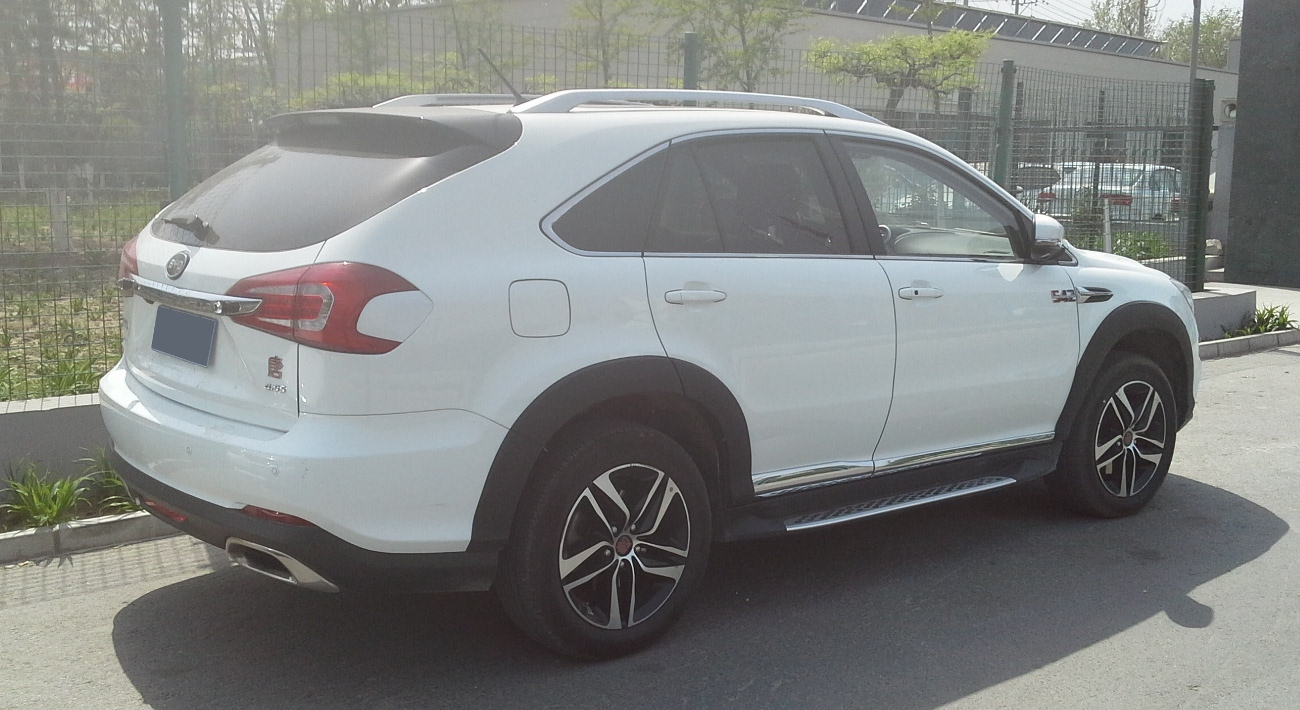
Rear view

== Second generation (2018) ==
Second generation
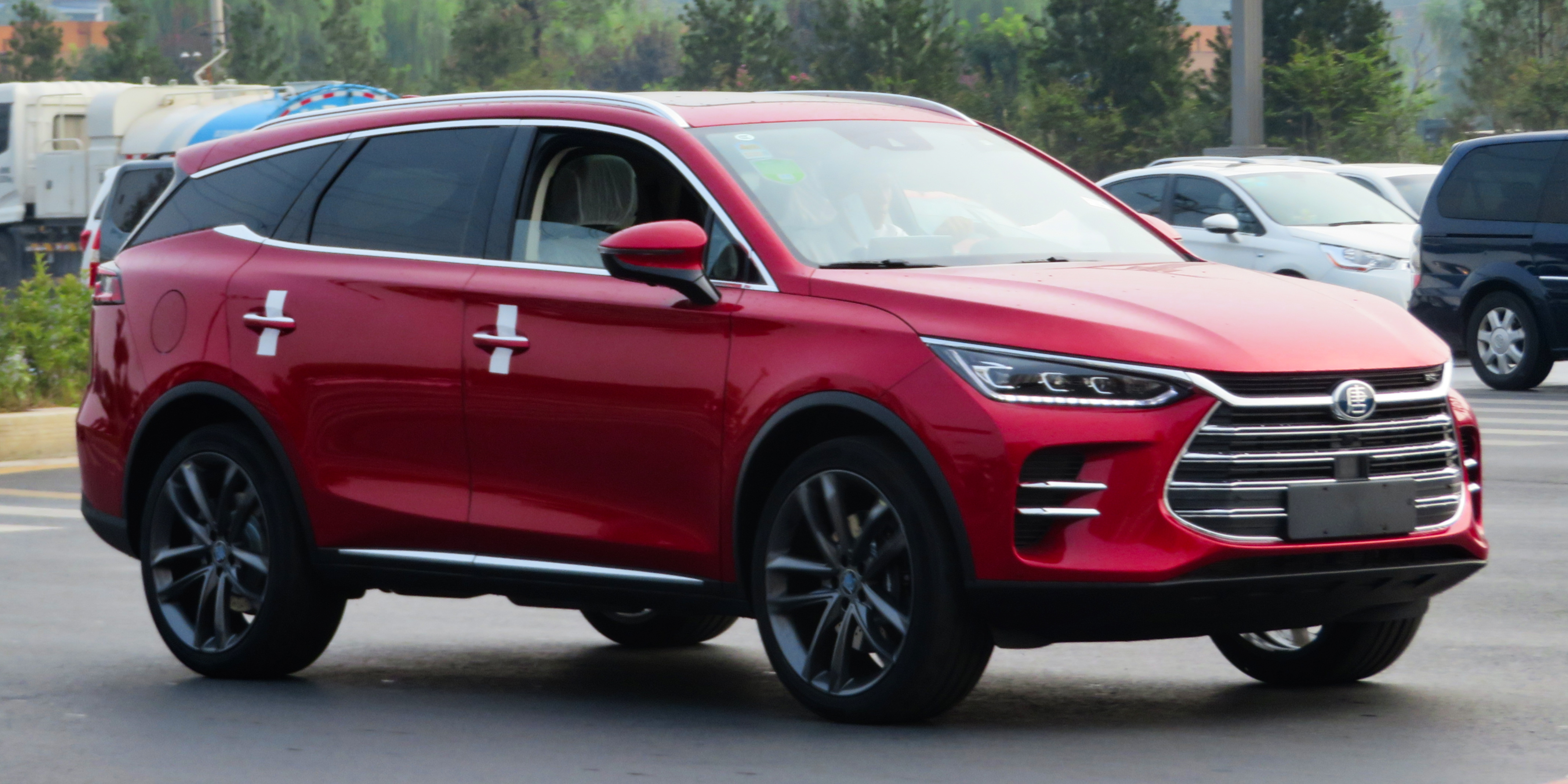
- 2018 BYD Tang DM

Overview
- Also called: BYD Tan EV (Brazil); BYD Sealion 8 (Vietnam)
- Production: 2018–present (DM Series); 2018–2021 (ICE); 2019–2025 (EV)
- Designer: Under the lead of Wolfgang Egger

Body and chassis
- Body style: 5-door crossover SUV
- Layout: Plug-in hybrid: Front-engine, front-wheel drive; Front-engine, full-time electric all-wheel-drive; Battery electric: Front-motor, FWD; Dual-motor, 4WD
- Platform: e-Platform 3.0 (Electric)
- Related: Denza X/N8; BYD Frigate 07; BYD Sealion 07 DM

Powertrain
- Engine: Petrol: 1.5 L I4 turbo (DM-i); 2.0 L BYD487ZQA I4 turbo
- Electric motor: 110 kW front AC permanent magnet synchronous 180 kW AC permanent magnet synchronous
- Transmission: 6-speed DCT; E-CVT (DM-i); 1-speed A/T (BEV)
- Battery: LFP battery: 17.1, 18.5, 22.3 kWh (DM); 9.98, 21.5 kWh (DM-i); 86.4 kWh (EV); 108.8 kWh (EV)
- Electric range: NEDC: 81–100 km (50–62 mi) (DM); 52–112 km (32–70 mi) (DM-i); 505–565 km (314–351 mi) (EV)

Dimensions
- Wheelbase: 2,820 mm (111.0 in)
- Length: 4,870 mm (191.7 in)
- Width: 1,950 mm (76.8 in)
- Height: 1,725 mm (67.9 in)

Featuring BYD's new family design language and previewed by the BYD Dynasty concept car in 2017, the second generation BYD Tang with completely redesigned exterior and interior debuted at Auto China in April 2018. The new model line will include purely petrol powered versions and pure electric versions (Tang EV600 and EV600D) besides plug-in hybrid ones (DM), with powertrains similar to the first generation. The Tang is also BYD's first vehicle to be exported to Europe, starting with Norway in 2021.

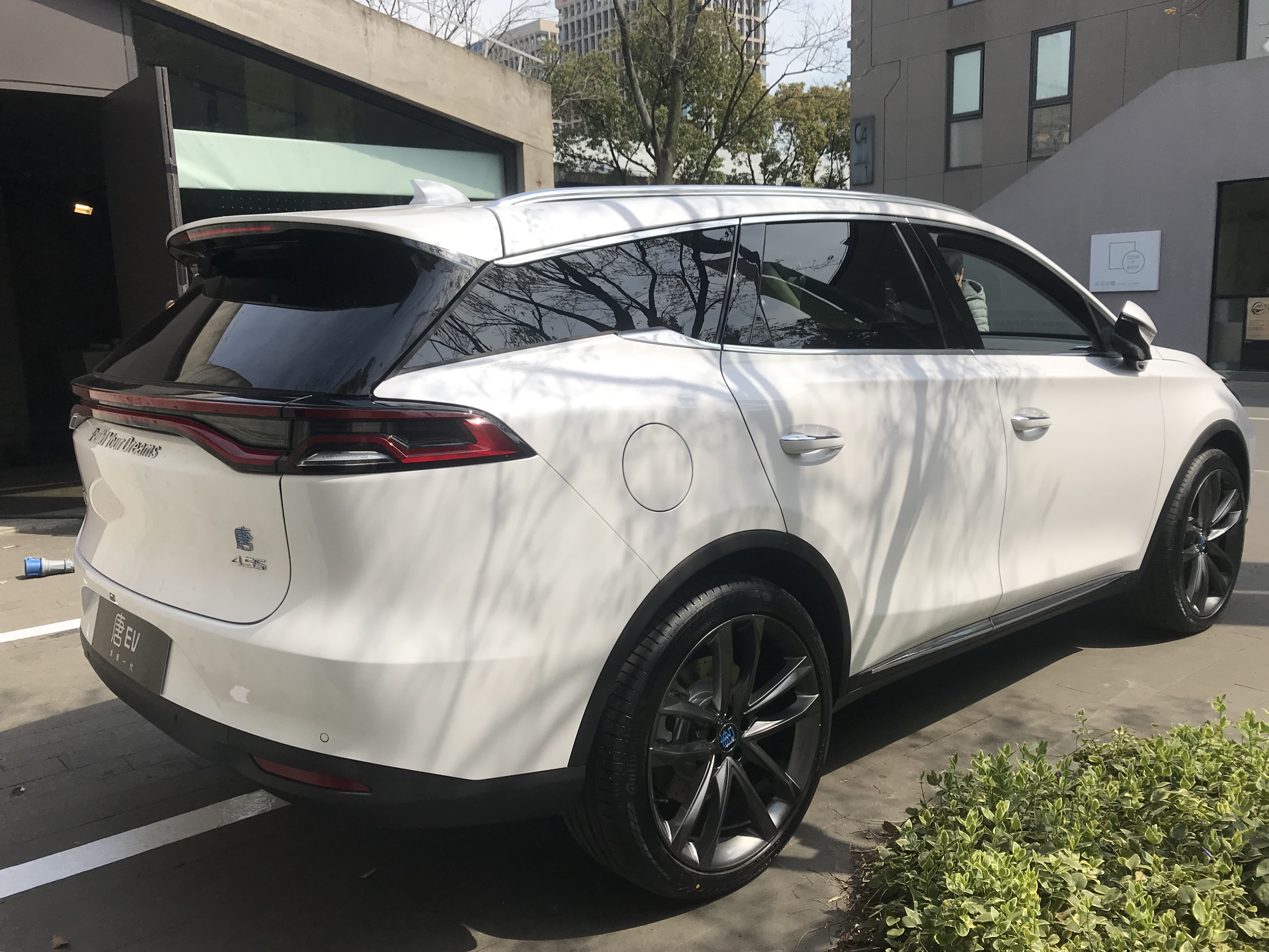
Rear view

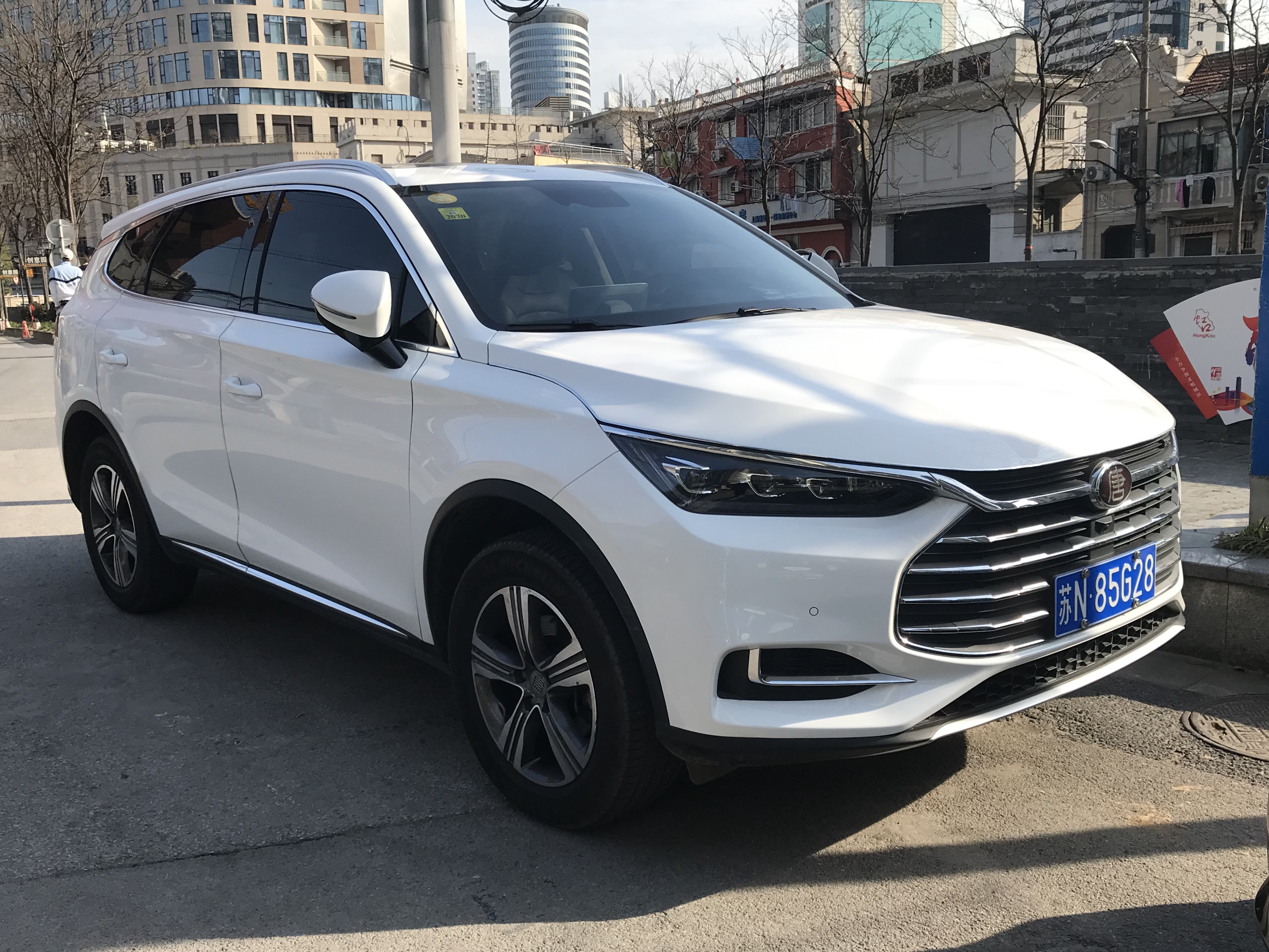
BYD Tang (ICE)

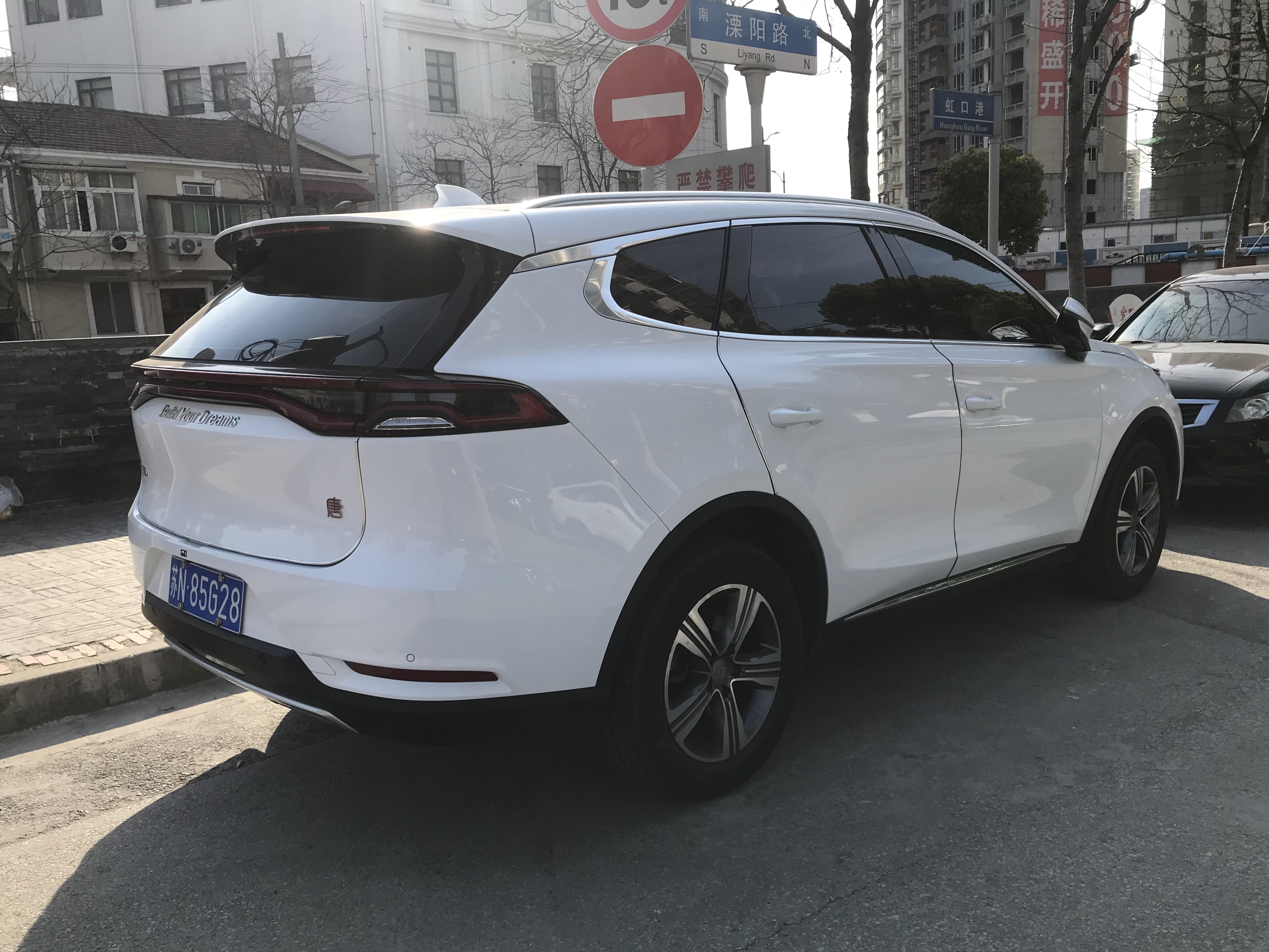
Rear view (ICE)

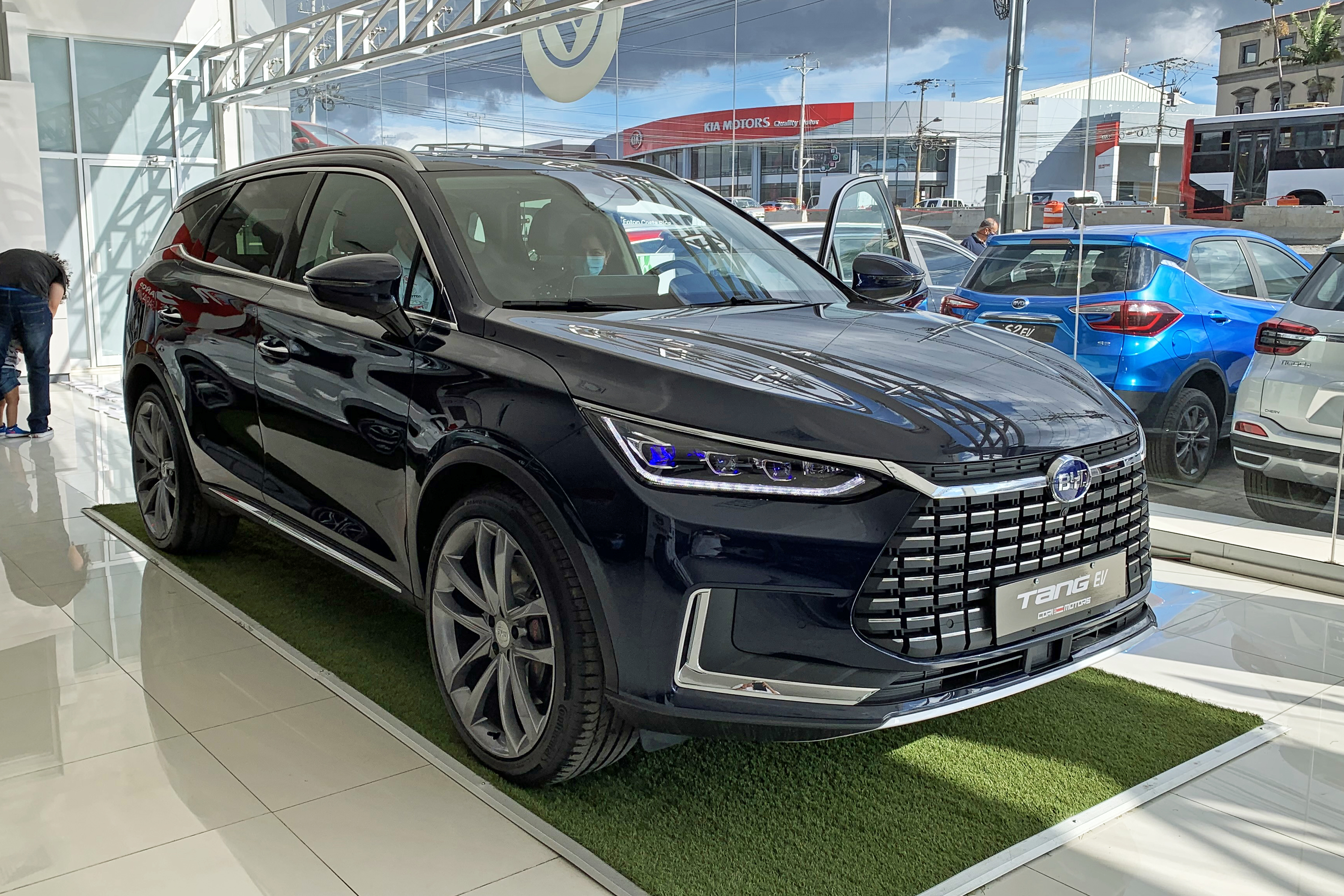
BYD Tang EV

=== 2021 facelift and DM-i ===
The Tang DM received a facelift for the 2021 model year alongside the introduction of the DM-i hybrid powertrain. Both models both receive the updated front and rear bumper designs.

The BYD DM-i powertrain is constructed with a 1.5-litre turbocharged engine powered plug-in hybrid system. The Tang DM-i is available as two models with a pure electric range of 52 km (32 mi) and 112 km (70 mi) respectively, with a total combined cruising range of 1,050 km (652 mi), equipped with a lithium iron phosphate blade battery. The fuel consumption is 5.3 L/100 km (44 mpg_{‑US}; 19 km/L) and 5.5 L/100 km (43 mpg_{‑US}; 18 km/L) for the two trim models respectively, and its 0–100 km/h (62 mph) acceleration time is 8.5 seconds. The 1.5-litre turbo engine is specifically built to accommodate the company's DM-i hybrid technology. In order to achieve high thermal efficiency, BYD designed the engine with compression ratio of 15.5, an increased bore to stroke ratio, Atkinson cycle for improved combustion efficiency, an exhaust gas recirculation (EGR) system, and a series of friction-reducing measures.

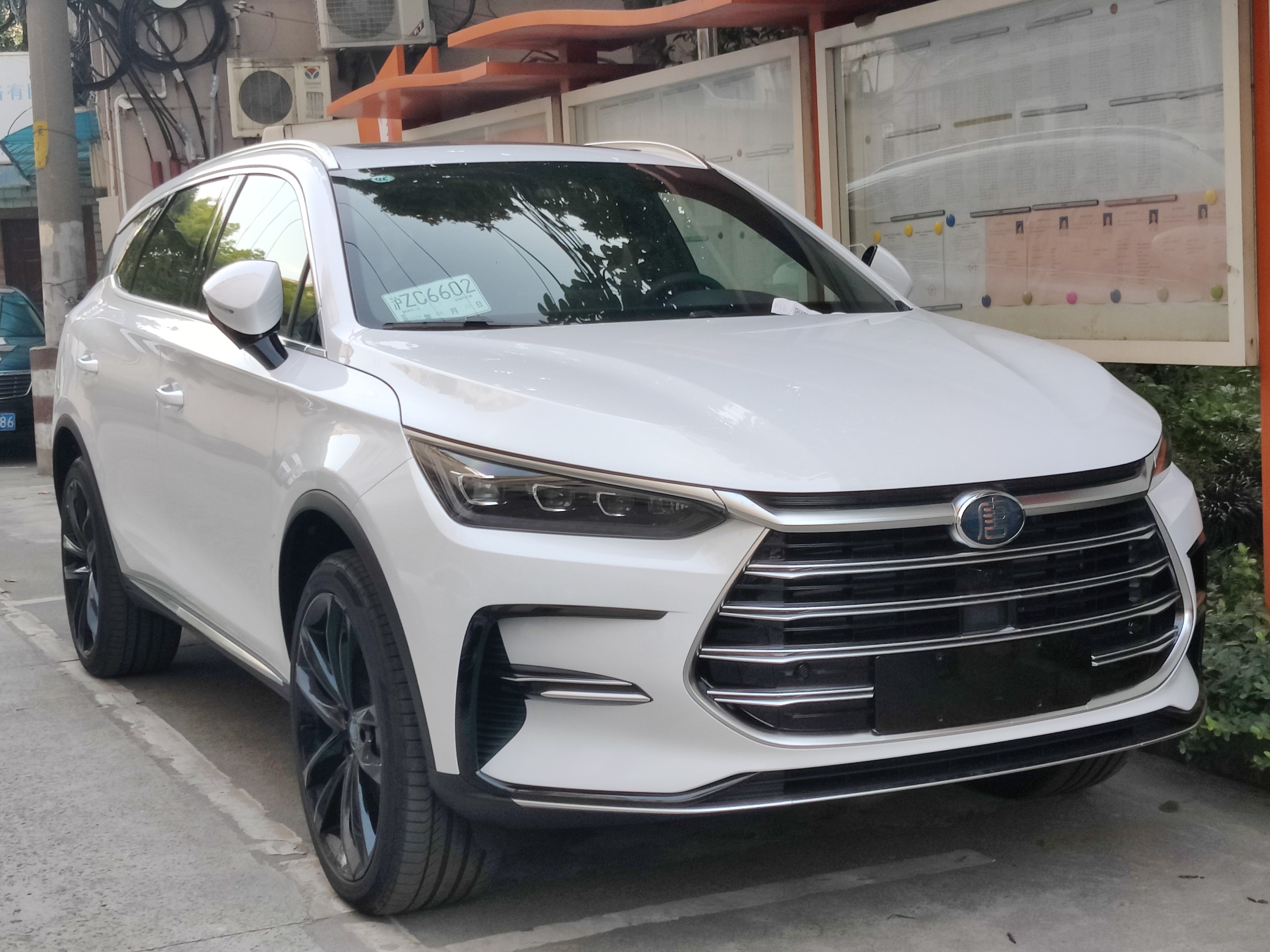
BYD Tang II DM-i

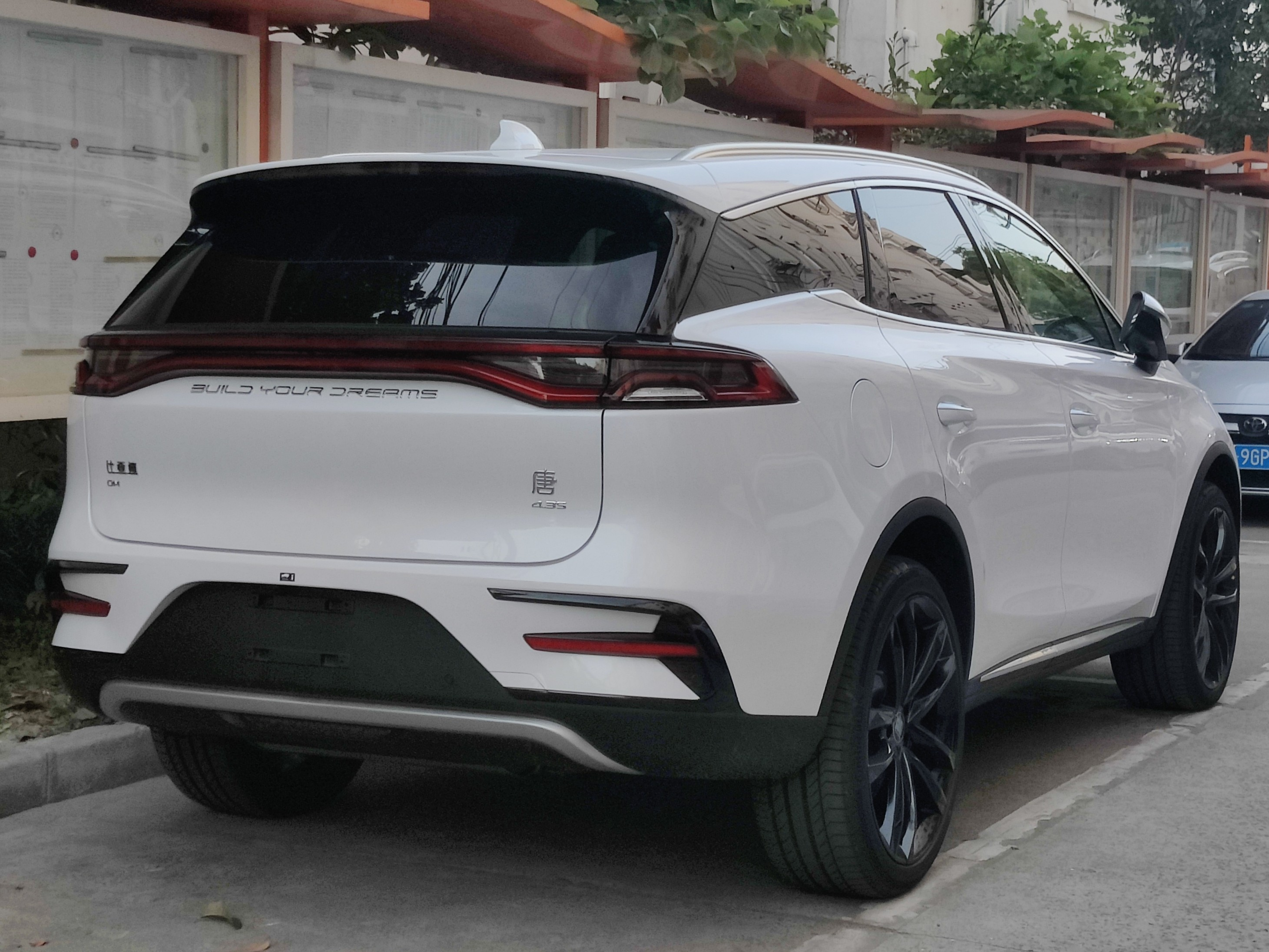
BYD Tang II DM-i rear

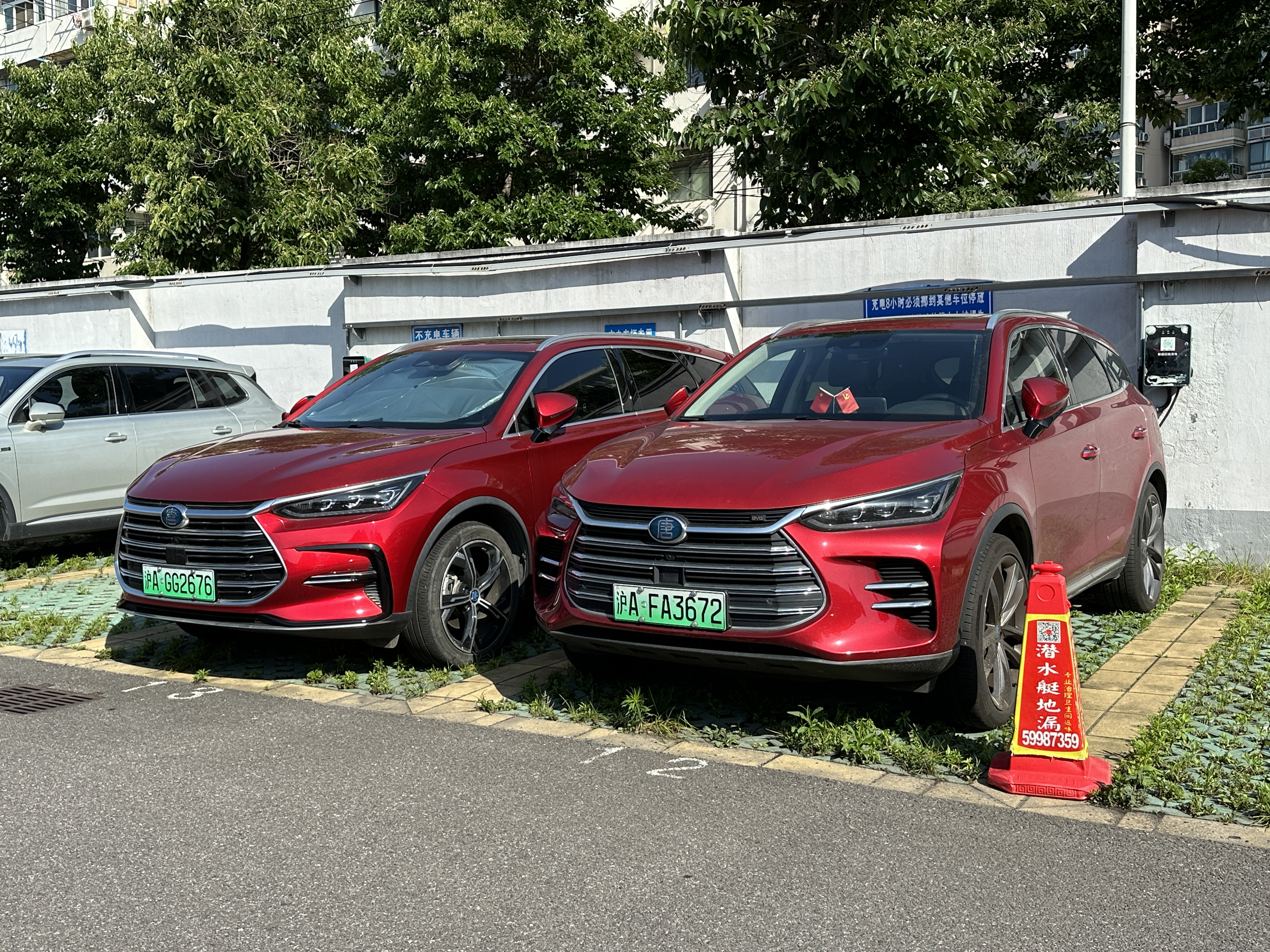
BYD Tang II DM-i (left) and DM (right)

=== 2022 facelift and DM-p ===
The second generation BYD Tang EV (the all-electric variant) received a facelift for the 2022 model year eliminating the grille, in line with the rest of the BYD Dynasty EV line-up. The battery capacity was increased to 108.8 kWh.

Among the DM (plug-in hybrid) variants, The DM-p was also introduced as a more performance oriented DM variant featuring the 1.5-litre turbo engine hybrid system. The 0–100 km/h (62 mph) acceleration time for the DM-p variant is under 4.3 seconds while maintaining the 215 km (134 mi) pure electric range.

The Tang DM-p received another update in 2023 featuring restyled tail lamps. The updated DM-p model debuted during the Chengdu Auto Show in August 2023.

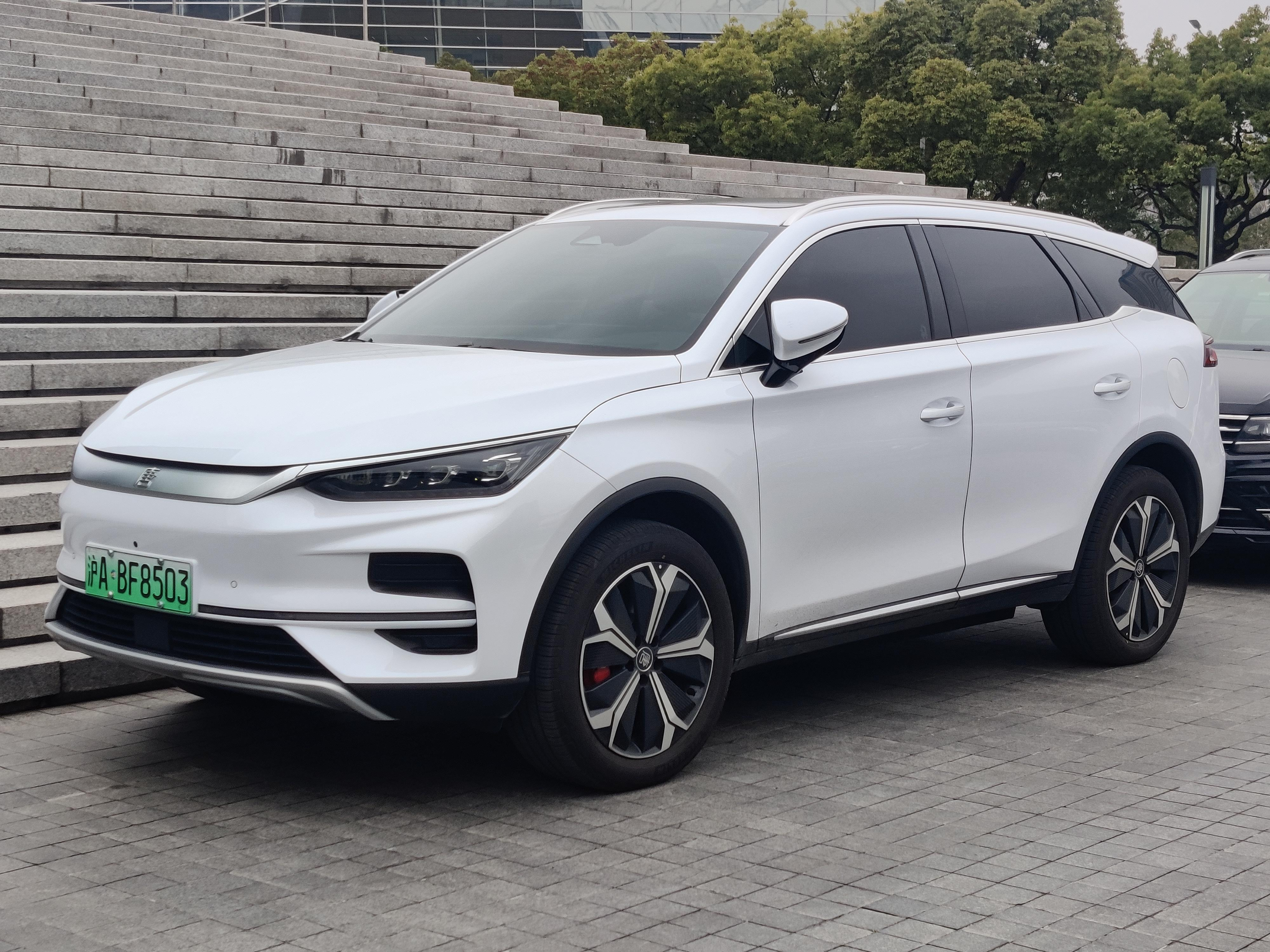
BYD Tang EV (2022 facelift)

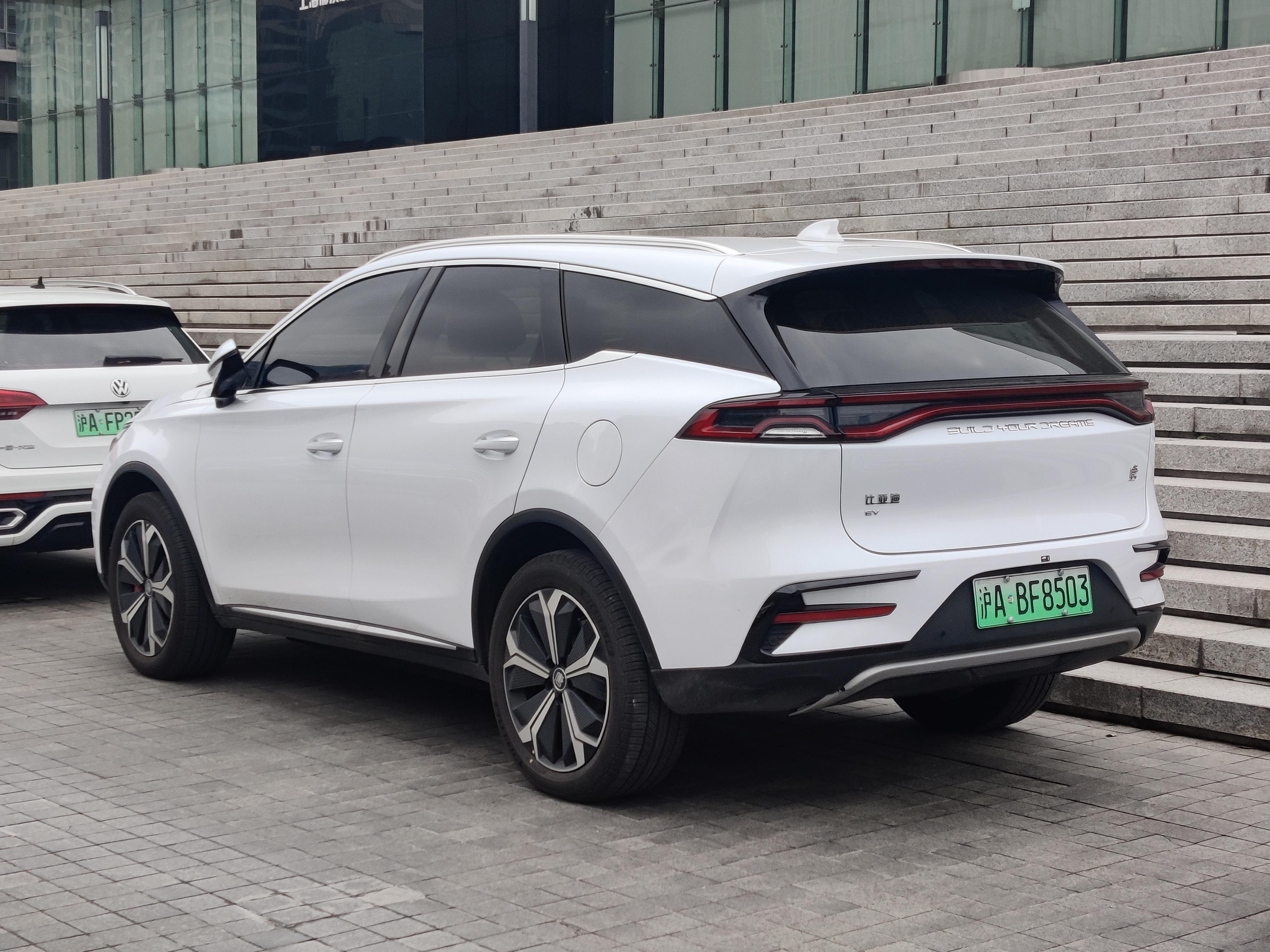
Rear view
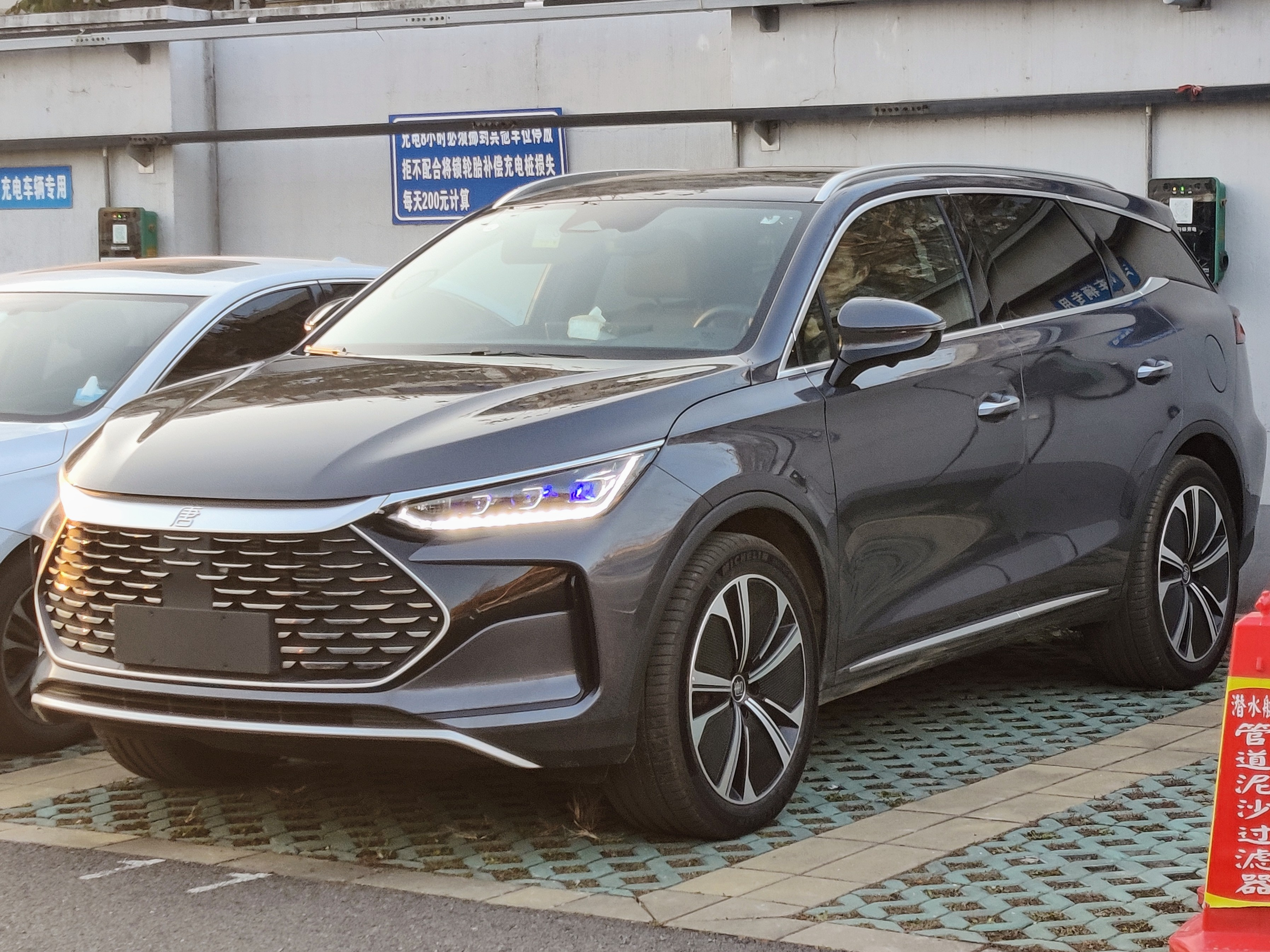
BYD Tang DM-p (2022 facelift)

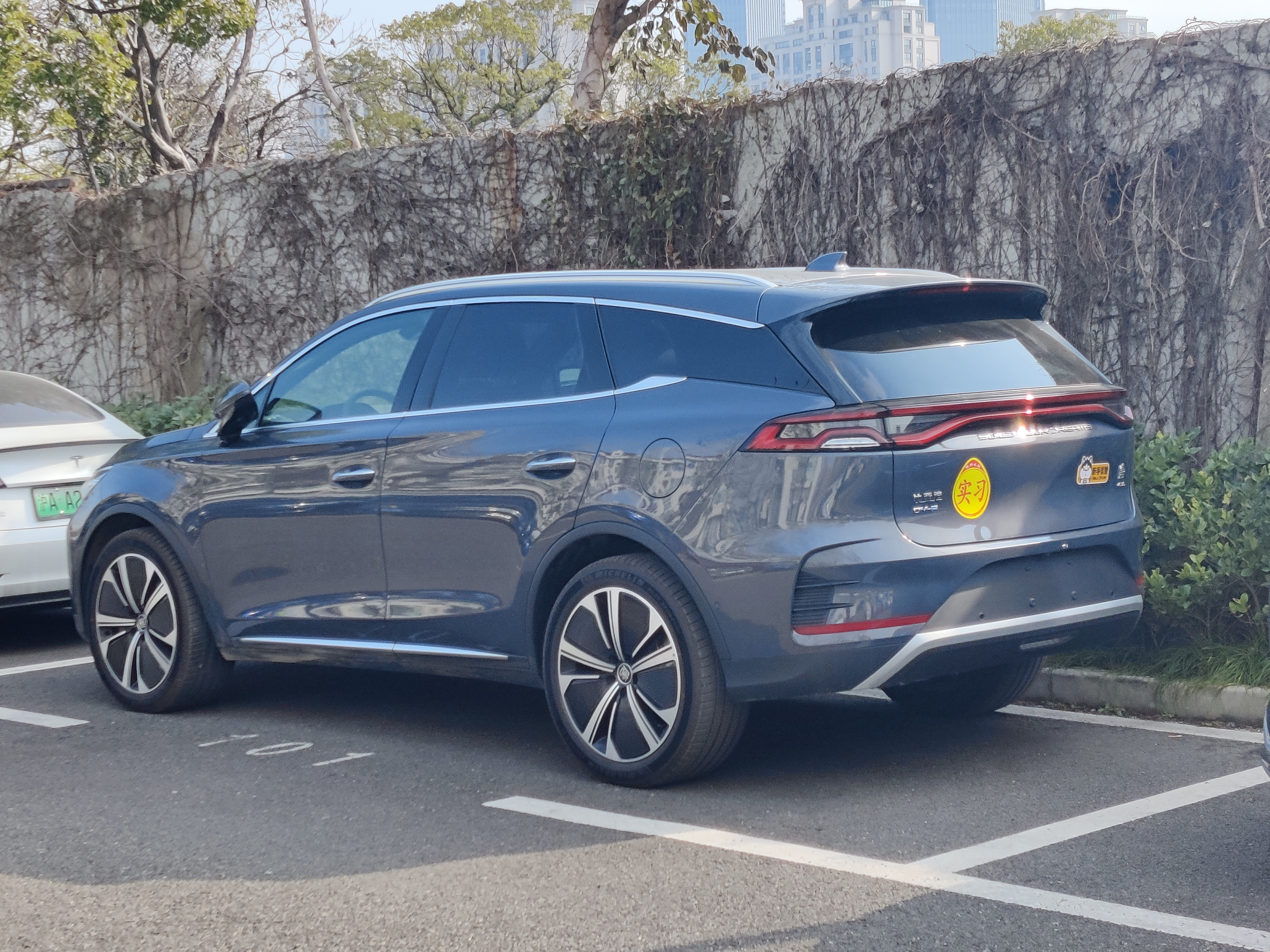
Rear view

=== Markets ===
==== Philippines ====
The Tang DM-i was launched in the Philippines on 17 September 2025, as the first plug-in hybrid BYD model equipped with a turbocharged engine in the country. It is available in the sole variant powered by the 1.5-litre DM-i turbocharged petrol engine and front-wheel drive.

==== Vietnam ====
The Tang L EV is marketed as the BYD Sealion 8 in Vietnam. It was launched on 18 April 2025 alongside the Sealion 6. It is available in the sole Performance variant using the 108.8 kWh Blade Battery pack.

== Third generation (2026) ==
Third generation

Overview
- Production: 2026 (to commence)
- Designer: Under the lead of Wolfgang Egger

Body and chassis
- Body style: 5-door crossover SUV
- Platform: e-Platform 3.0 (Electric)
- Related: BYD Datang

Dimensions
- Wheelbase: 2,950 mm (116.1 in)
- Length: 5,045 mm (198.6 in)
- Width: 1,980 mm (78.0 in)
- Height: 1,740–1,760 mm (68.5–69.3 in)

The third generation Tang was first revealed through China's MIIT documents on 10 July 2026. Unlike its predecessor, it is now exclusively offered in a two row five-seat configuration despite its larger size.

According to BYD, it slots above the Tang L; and is positioned alongside the larger and related three-row Datang as "dual flagships", sharing similar technologies.

The third generation Tang heavily resembles the larger, flagship Datang, featuring BYD's Loong (dragon) face design language that includes a front light bar with split headlights and a rear light bar inspired by Chinese knots. It has a floating roof and semi-flush door handles. Wheel options of either 20 or 21 inches are available.

The interior consists of a wide and slim 35.4-inch display used to display driving information such as speed, range and navigation, while a continuous 30-inch display spans across the central and passenger area, handling main infotainment and entertainment functions. It is the first BYD vehicle to use this setup.

It is equipped with BYD's second-generation Blade Battery and flash charging technologies, allowing a charge from 10%-70% in around 5 minutes and a charge to 97% in 9 minutes. So far, two battery configurations have been revealed, with capacities of 88.7 kWh and 105.8 kWh, and a CLTC electric range ranging from 730–850 km (450–530 mi) depending on the configuration.

== Tang L (2025) ==
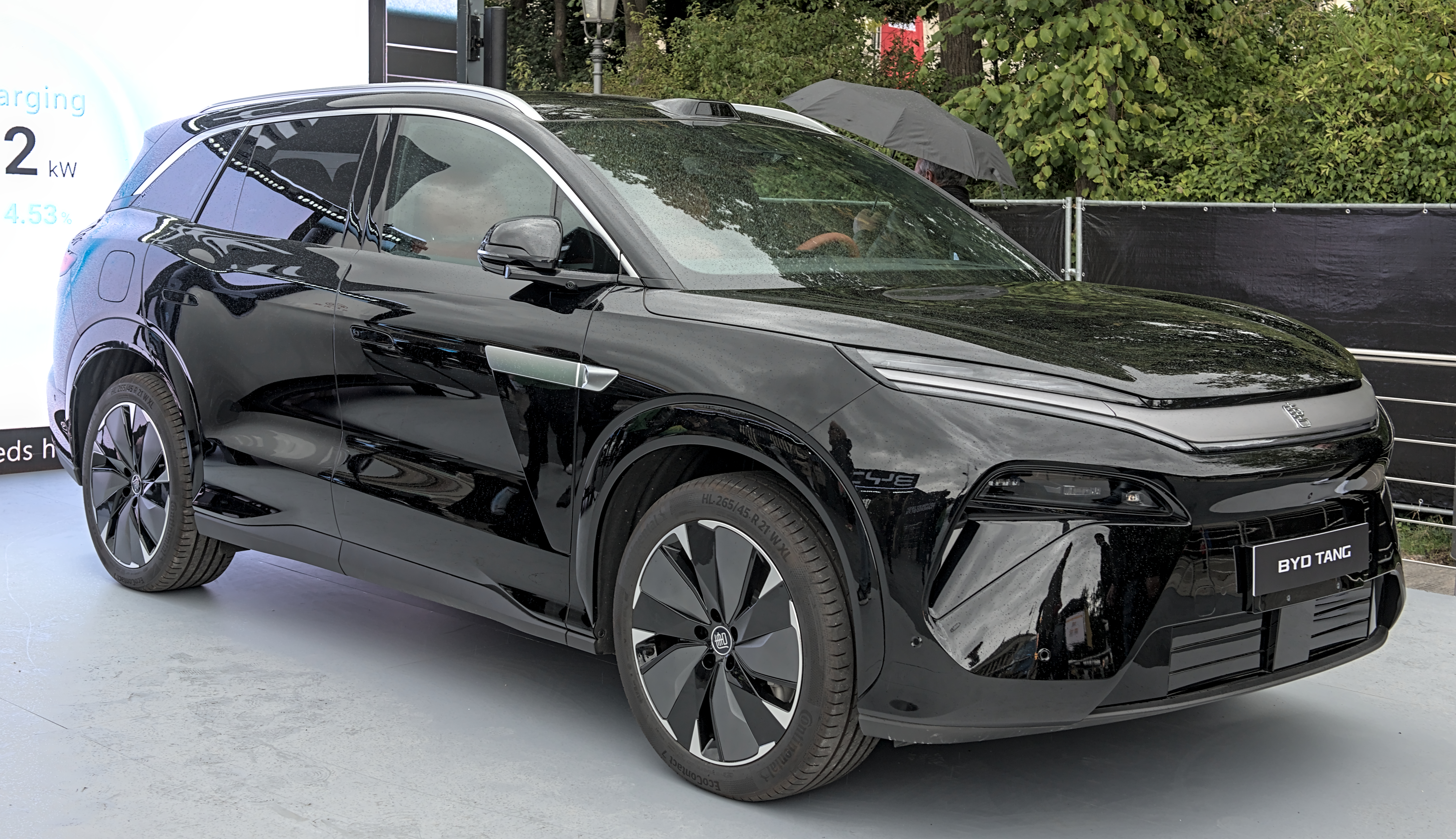
2025 BYD Tang L EV

The Tang L is a plug-in hybrid and battery-electric SUV belonging to the E-segment (mid-size) and was sold since 2025, based on the DM-i 5.0 platform and Super e platform.

== Datang (2026) ==
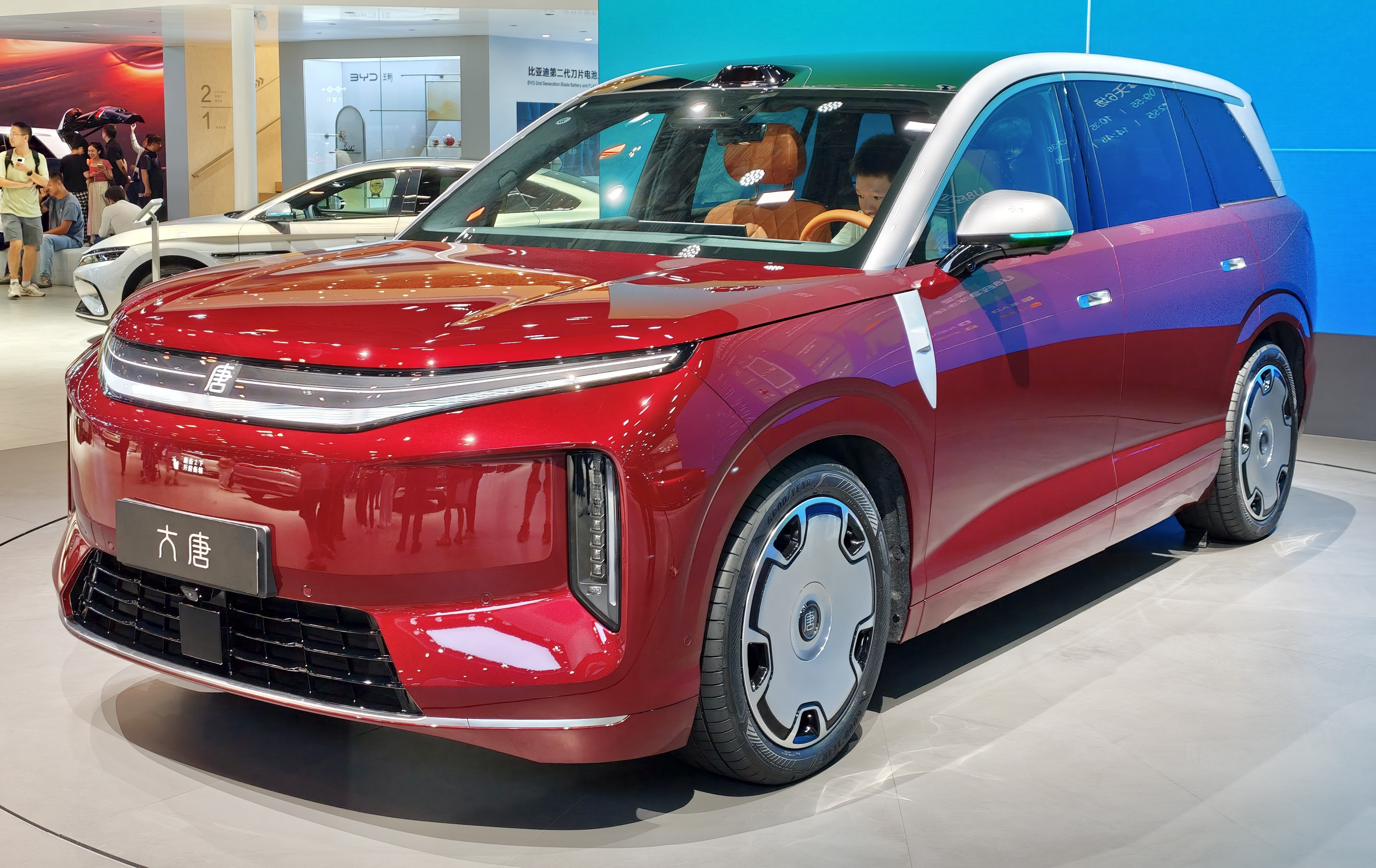
2026 BYD Datang EV

The Datang is a F-segment (full-size) plug-in hybrid and battery-electric SUV. According to BYD, the Datang is its first full-size (Chinese "D-segment", Chinese: D级) SUV and is its flagship SUV.

== Safety ==
C-NCAP (2018) test results 2018 BYD Tang DM (II)
Category		%
Overall:	5 /5 stars	86.2%
Occupant protection:		88.13%
Vulnerable road users:		67.43%
Active safety:		96.18%

Euro NCAP test results BYD Tang Flagship (LHD) (2023)
Test	Points	%
Overall:	5 /5 stars	
Adult occupant:	35.1	87%
Child occupant:	43	87%
Pedestrian:	50.9	80%
Safety assist:	13.3	73%

== Sales ==
Year	China			
Year	Tang DM	Tang EV	Tang (ICE)	Total
2015	18,375	—	—	18,375
2016	31,405	—	—	31,405
2017	14,547	—	—	14,547
2018	34,867	—	27,211	62,078
2019	40,945	—	35,796	76,741
2020	21,029	563	13,991	35,583
2021	48,152	5,062	990	54,204
2022	116,312	23,824	9,625	149,761
2023	128,812	12,049	—	140,861
2024	131,340	9,287	—	140,627
2025	68,040	146	—	68,186

== See also ==
- List of BYD Auto vehicles
