= BYD S6 =

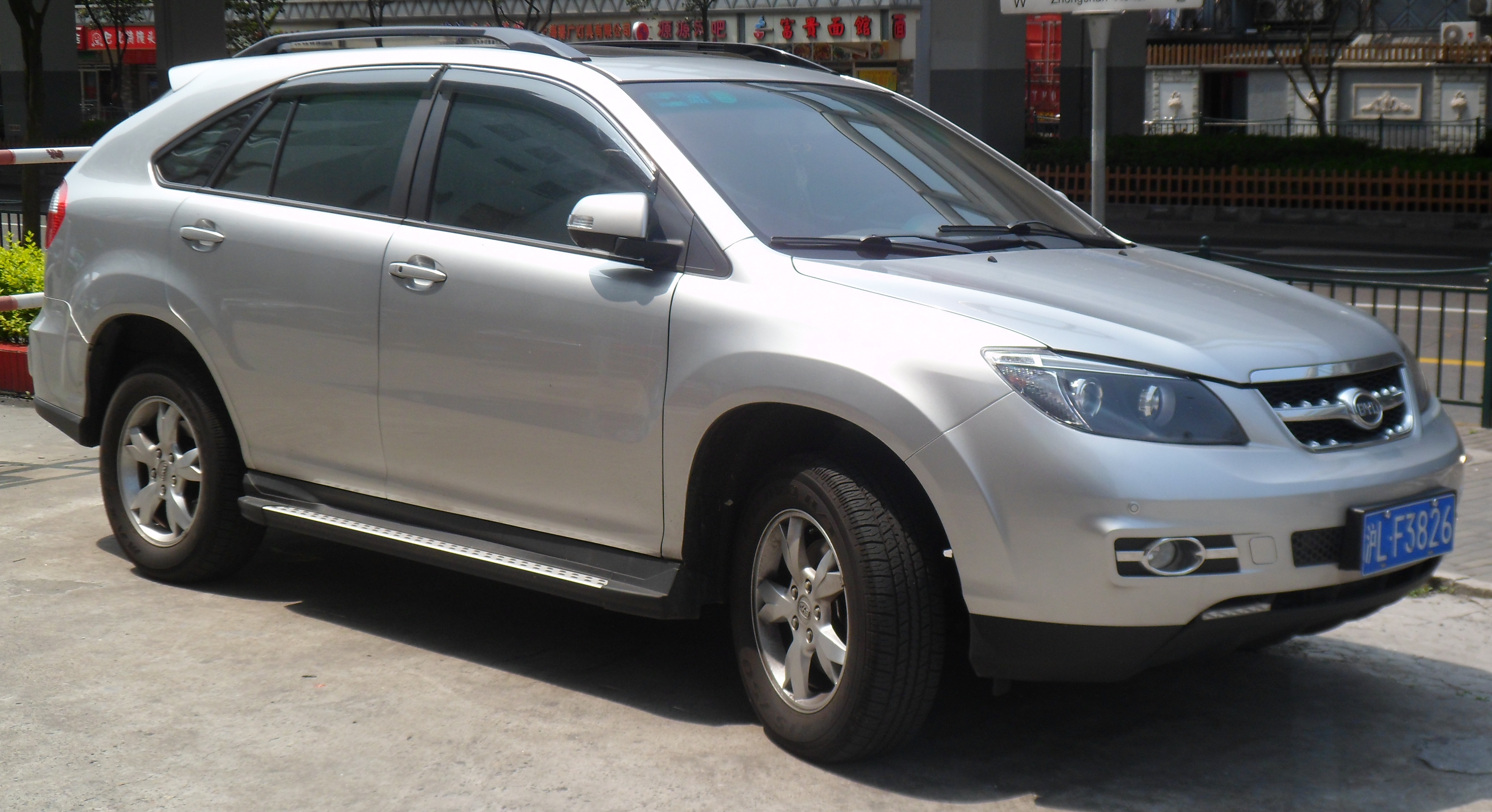

Overview
- Manufacturer: BYD
- Also called: BYD S7
- Production: China: 2011–2016 (S6); 2014–2018 (S7)
- Assembly: Changsha, China; Iran (Karmania Auto)

Body and chassis
- Class: Mid-size crossover SUV
- Body style: 5-door Sport utility vehicle
- Related: BYD Tang

Powertrain
- Engine: 1.5 L BYD476ZQA I4 (turbo petrol); 2.0 L BYD483QB I4 (petrol); 2.4 L BYD488QA I4 (petrol); 2.4 L 4G69 I4 (petrol)
- Transmission: 6-speed manual; 5-speed manual; 6-speed DCT; 4-speed automatic

Dimensions
- Wheelbase: 2,720 mm (107.1 in)
- Length: 4,810 mm (189.4 in)
- Width: 1,855 mm (73.0 in)
- Height: 1,725 mm (67.9 in)
- Curb weight: 1,710–1,760 kg (3,770–3,880 lb)

Chronology
- Successor: BYD Tang

The BYD S6 is a mid-size crossover SUV designed and manufactured by BYD Auto. It is also the brand's first crossover SUV product. Its production began in April 2011 and lasted until May 2016, although a version of it, known as the BYD S7, was maintained until 2018.

== Background ==
The BYD S6 was shown at the Guangzhou Auto Show in late 2010 and since May 6, 2011 when this model was first officially sold in Changsha, China. It became the best selling China domestic SUV in sales volume by reaching 15,000 units in December, 2011, being awarded as "Fastest Seller SUV" and has been named China's "SUV of the Year" according to the Annual Ranking of Chinese Automobiles.

There are two models of the BYD S6 available to public sales in China, the 2.0 L and 2.4 L, with eight versions featuring different trim and equipment levels.

== Safety ==
In December 2012, the China Automobile Technology Research Center published the C-NCAP crash-testing impact scores of BYD S6, awarding it the highest five-star safety rating for an SUV. This designation makes the S6 the first Chinese domestic SUV model with this rating. In C-NCAP tests, the BYD S6 out-performed other brands in body structure, design, and safety device validation.

In November 2012, the upgraded model BYD S6 Jin Yue version was introduced equipped with the world's first intelligent watch key which is not just used to check the time, but also can achieve the identification, induction door, keyless entry, one-click startup. This is expected to help decrease the risk of vehicles stolen due to missing keys.

== Design controversies ==
The design of the BYD S6, S7, and later variants including the first generation BYD Tang are very controversial as the side profile heavily resembles the second generation Lexus RX crossover SUV.

== Global markets ==
The BYD S6 has been exported to Ukraine, and Uruguay. It made its debut at 2012 Chile Show and was expected to begin sales in Chile from December, 2012.

The BYD S6 has also been produced in Iran and Karmania car factory since 2017.

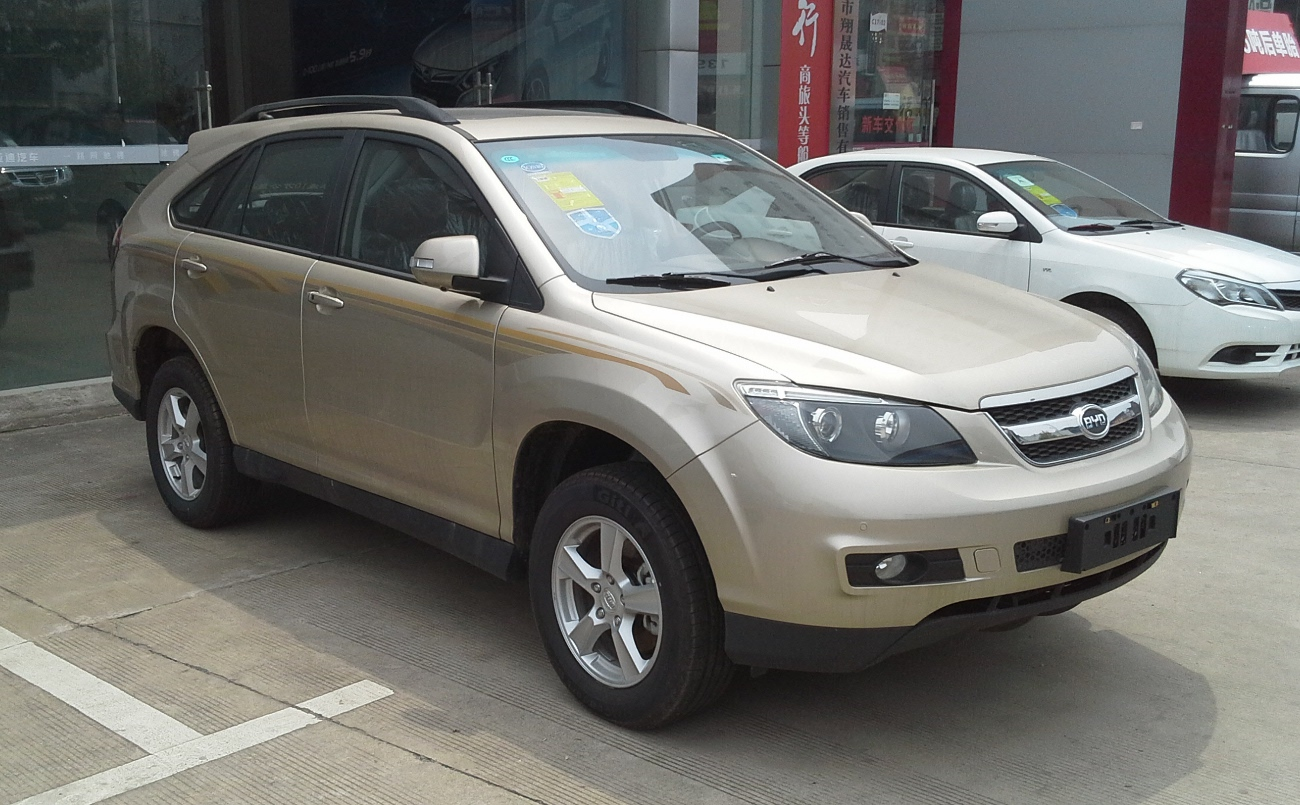
BYD S6 front

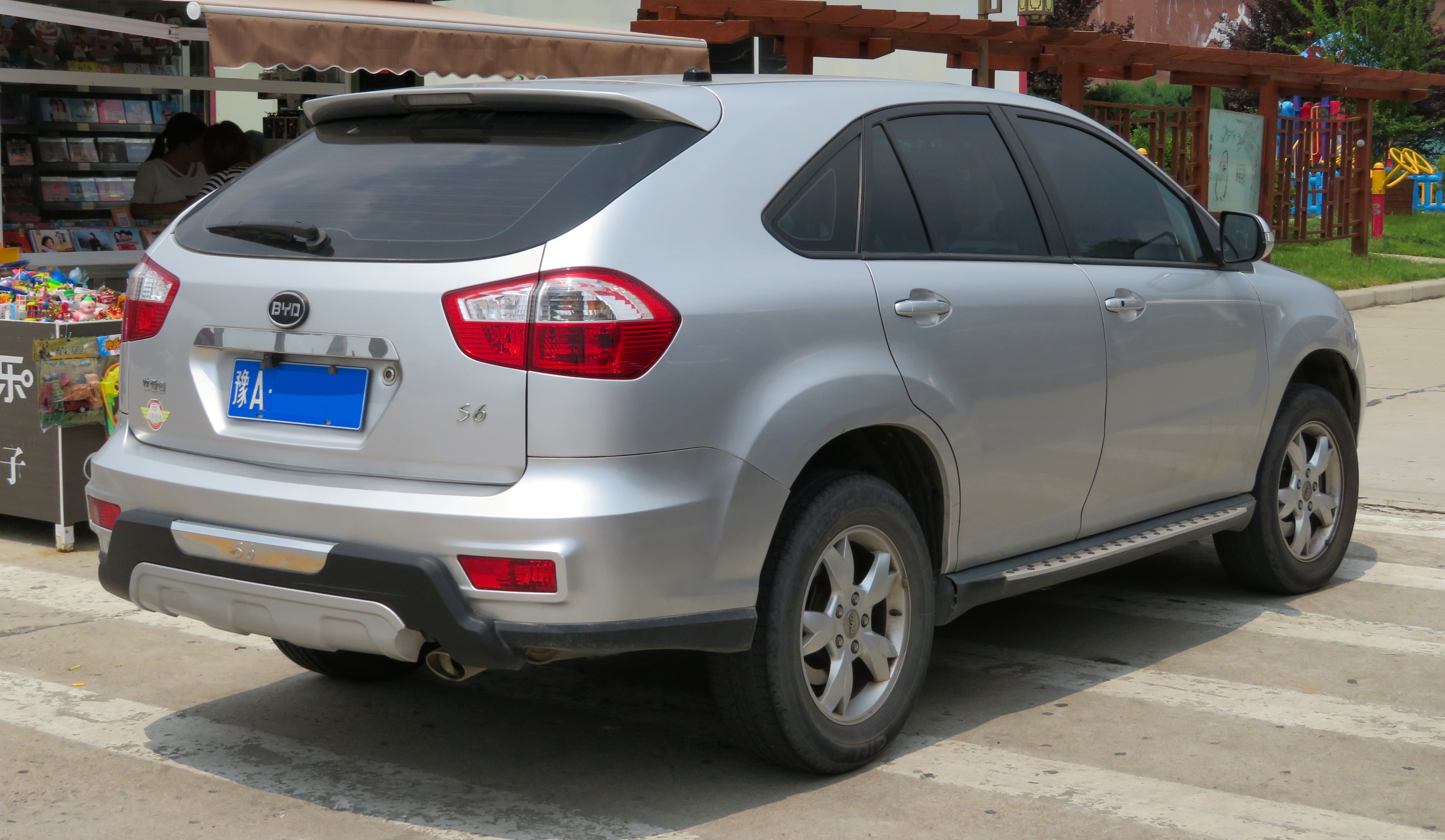
BYD S6 rear

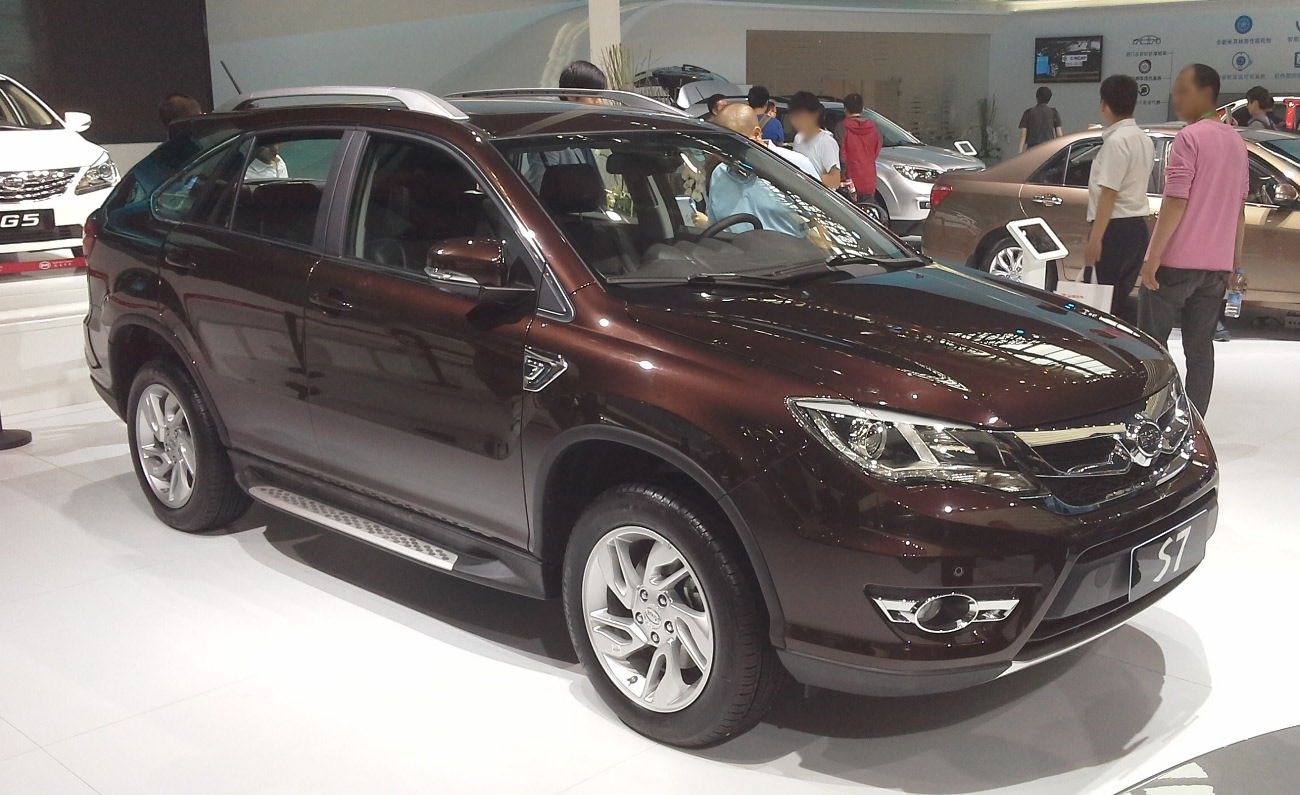
BYD S7 front

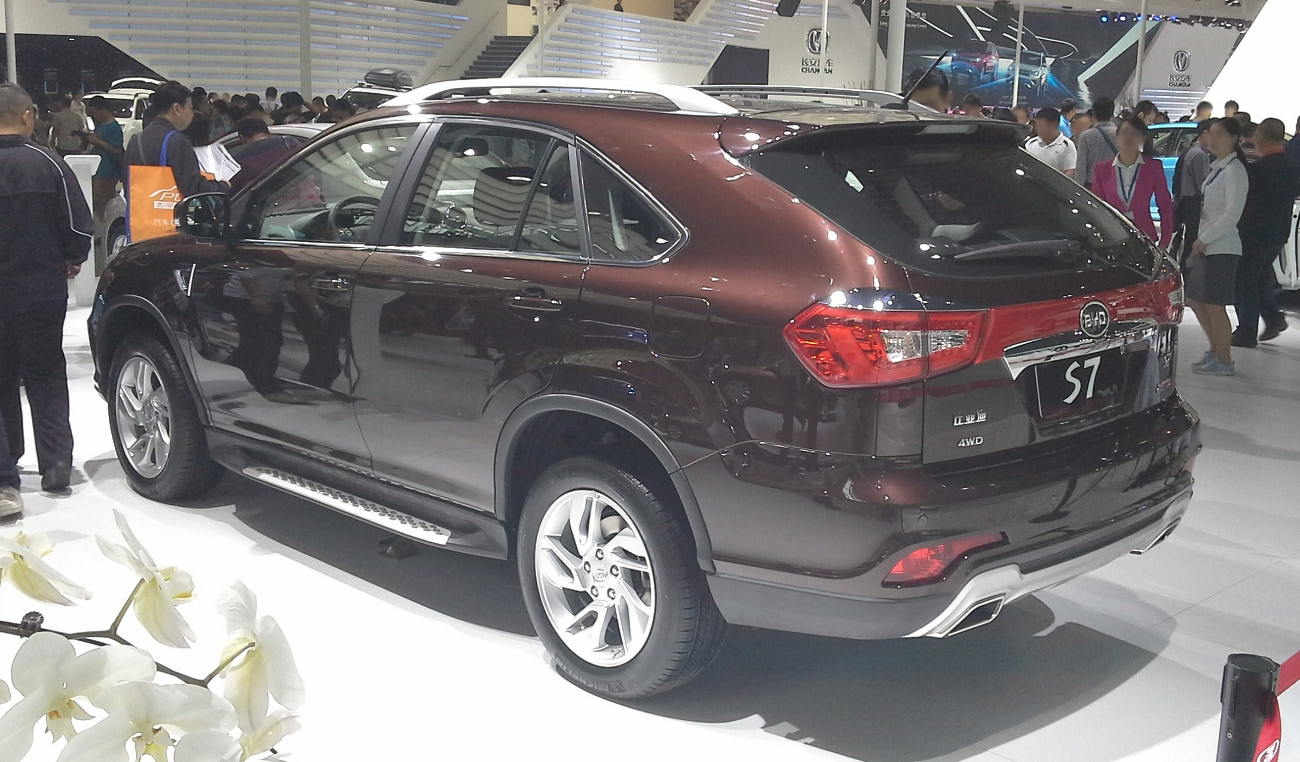
BYD S7 rear
