= Worshipful Company of Water Conservators =

Livery company of the City of London

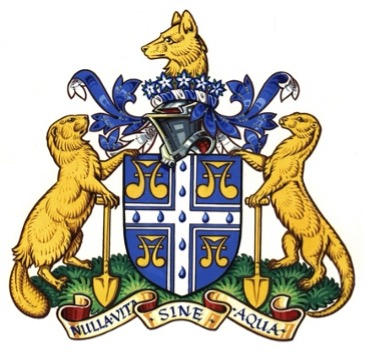

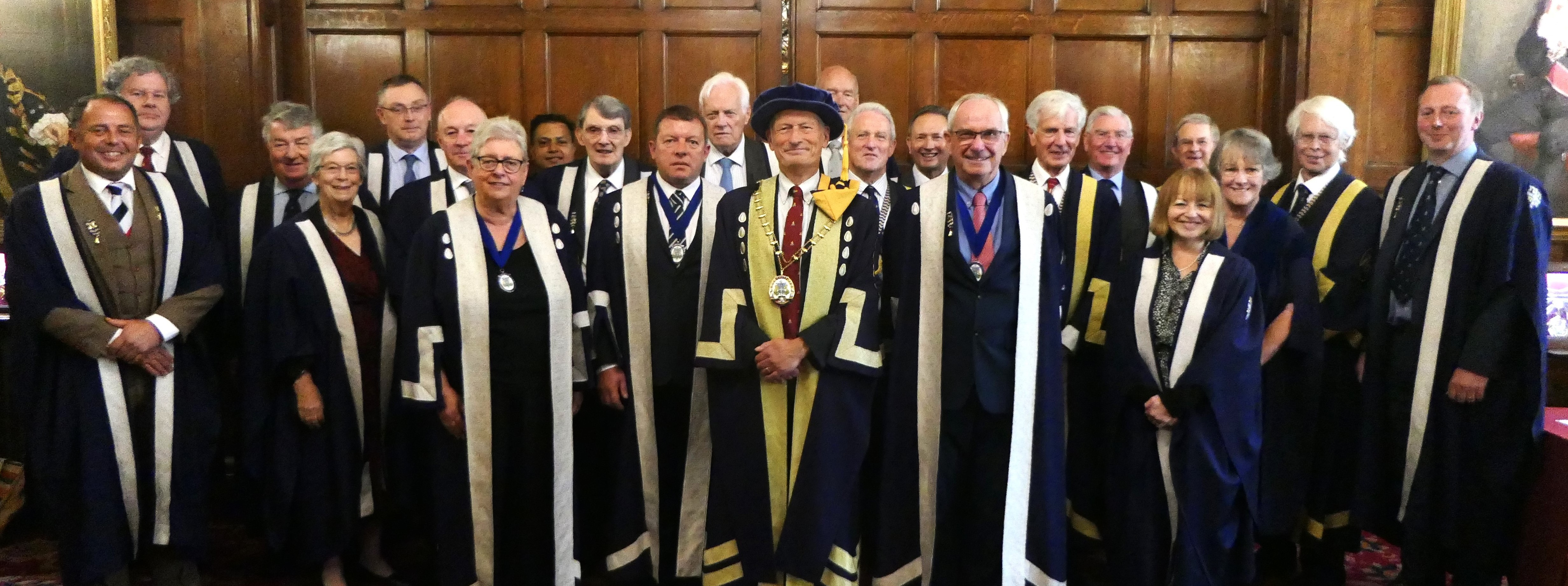

The Worshipful Company of Water Conservators is one of the Livery Companies of the city of London.

In 1988, some members of the Select Society of Sanitary Sludge Shovelers (5S), who were also members of the Institution of Water and Environmental Management (IWEM; chartered in 1995, now CIWEM), founded the Guild of Water Conservators. It was recognised as a company in 1994. Its petition for livery was granted by the Court of Aldermen with effect from 2000. It received a Royal Charter in 2005.

The Water Conservators' Company ranks 102nd in the order of precedence of the City Livery Companies.

The supporters of the company's coat of arms consist of a beaver and an otter. Each of them is holding a golden shovel to recognise the part played by the British chapter of the 5S (whose badge is a golden shovel) in the formation of the guild.

The wolf is from the coat of arms of the Myddelton family, relating to the fact that Sir Hugh Myddelton was responsible for bringing clean drinking water to London via the New River.

The company's church is All Hallows by the Tower.
