= 5S =

5S may refer to:

- 5S (methodology), a Japanese management methodology
- 5S ribosomal RNA
- Select Society of Sanitary Sludge Shovelers
- A series of Toyota S engines
- A technique for calming babies, as suggested by Harvey Karp
- iPhone 5S, a smartphone by Apple Inc.
- 5S, the production code for the 1981 Doctor Who serial Warriors' Gate
- Fives, an English sport

== See also ==
- S5 (disambiguation)
- 5 (disambiguation)
