= S5 =

S5 or S-5 may refer to:

== Science ==
- Pentasulfur (S_{5}), an allotrope of sulfur
- S_{5}, the symmetric group on five elements
- S5: Keep contents under ... (appropriate liquid to be specified by the manufacturer), a safety phrase in chemistry
- Sacral spinal nerve 5, a spinal nerve of the sacral segment
- S5, the fifth sacral vertebra of the vertebral column, in human anatomy

== Technology ==
=== Electronics ===
- Canon PowerShot S5 IS, a 2007 8.0 megapixel bridge digital camera
- Coolpix S5, a 6 Megapixels Nikon Coolpix series digital camera
- FinePix S5 Pro, a 2006 digital single lens reflex camera by Fujifilm
- Samsung Galaxy S5, an Android smartphone by Samsung
- Samsung Galaxy Tab S5e, an Android tablet
- Simatic S5 PLC, a programmable logic controller family by Siemens

=== Software ===
- S5 (file format), for defining slideshows
- ACPI S5 power state, of the Advanced Configuration and Power Interface in computing

== Transportation ==
=== Airlines and airports ===
- Star Air (India) (IATA airline code: S5)
- Shuttle America (IATA airline code: S5)
- Trast Aero, (IATA airline code: S5)
- Bandon State Airport (FAA code: S05)
- Slovenia, International Aircraft Registration Prefixes (ICAO country code: S5)

=== Mass-transit lines ===
==== S-Bahn ====
- S5 (Berlin) in Germany
- S5 (Munich) in Germany
- S5 (Nuremberg) in Germany
- S5 (RER Vaud), an S-Bahn line in Switzerland
- S5 (Rhine-Main S-Bahn) in Germany
- S5 (Rhine-Ruhr S-Bahn) in Germany
- S5 (St. Gallen S-Bahn), an S-Bahn line in Switzerland
- S5 (ZVV), in the cantons of Zurich, St. Gallen and Schwyz in Switzerland
- S5, a Basel S-Bahn line located in Germany
- S5, a Breisgau S-Bahn line in Germany
- S5, a Carinthia S-Bahn line in Austria
- S5, a Hanover S-Bahn line in Germany
- S5, a Lucerne S-Bahn line in Switzerland
- S5, a Stuttgart S-Bahn line in Germany
- S5, a Styria S-Bahn line in Austria
- S5, an Upper Austria S-Bahn line in Austria

==== Other lines ====
- Line S5 (Chengdu Metro), China
- Line S5 (Chongqing Suburban Railway), China
- Line S5 (Nanjing Metro), China
- Line S5 (Milan suburban railway service), Italy
- An alternate name for the Huairou–Miyun line in Beijing, China
- S5, a tram line part of the Stadtbahn Karlsruhe in Germany
- FGC line S5, a suburban train line in Barcelona Province, Spain

=== Roads ===
- County Route S5 (California), a county route in California, U.S.
- S5 Shanghai–Jiading Expressway in Shanghai, China
- Expressway S5, a Polish highway

=== Vehicles ===
Aircraft

- Rans S-5 Coyote, an ultralight aircraft
- Sikorsky S-5, Igor Sikorsky's first successful aircraft design
- Supermarine S.5, a 1920s British single-engine single-seater racing seaplane

Automobiles

- Audi S5, a German compact executive sports car
- BYD Song, a Chinese compact SUV known as the BYD S5 in Egypt
- Haima S5, a Chinese compact SUV
- Haima S5 Young, a Chinese subcompact SUV
- Huansu S5, a Chinese compact SUV
- JAC Refine S5, a Chinese compact SUV
- Luxgen S5, a Taiwanese compact sedan
- MGS5 EV, an electric compact SUV

Spacecraft

- Saturn V, a retired American space launch vehicle

Trains

- ALCO S-5, an American diesel switching (shunting) locomotive
- Prussian S 5, an 1894 steam locomotive class

Watercraft

- USS S-5 (SS-110), a 1919 S-class submarine of the United States Navy

== Other uses ==
- S5 (modal logic), in logic and philosophy
- S-5 rocket
- S5 (band), an Indian pop band
- S5 (classification), a disability swimming classification
- British NVC community S5, a swamps and tall-herb fens community in the British National Vegetation Classification system
- Fifth year, in the Scottish education system
- S5, a public affairs officer within military units; see staff
- S5 postcode, in the S postcode area covering areas of northern Sheffield
- S-5 visa, a non-immigrant visa which allows travel to United States for individuals who are witnesses, informants

== See also ==
- 5S (disambiguation)
- SysV, the UNIX System V
