= BYD Song =

Compact crossover SUV

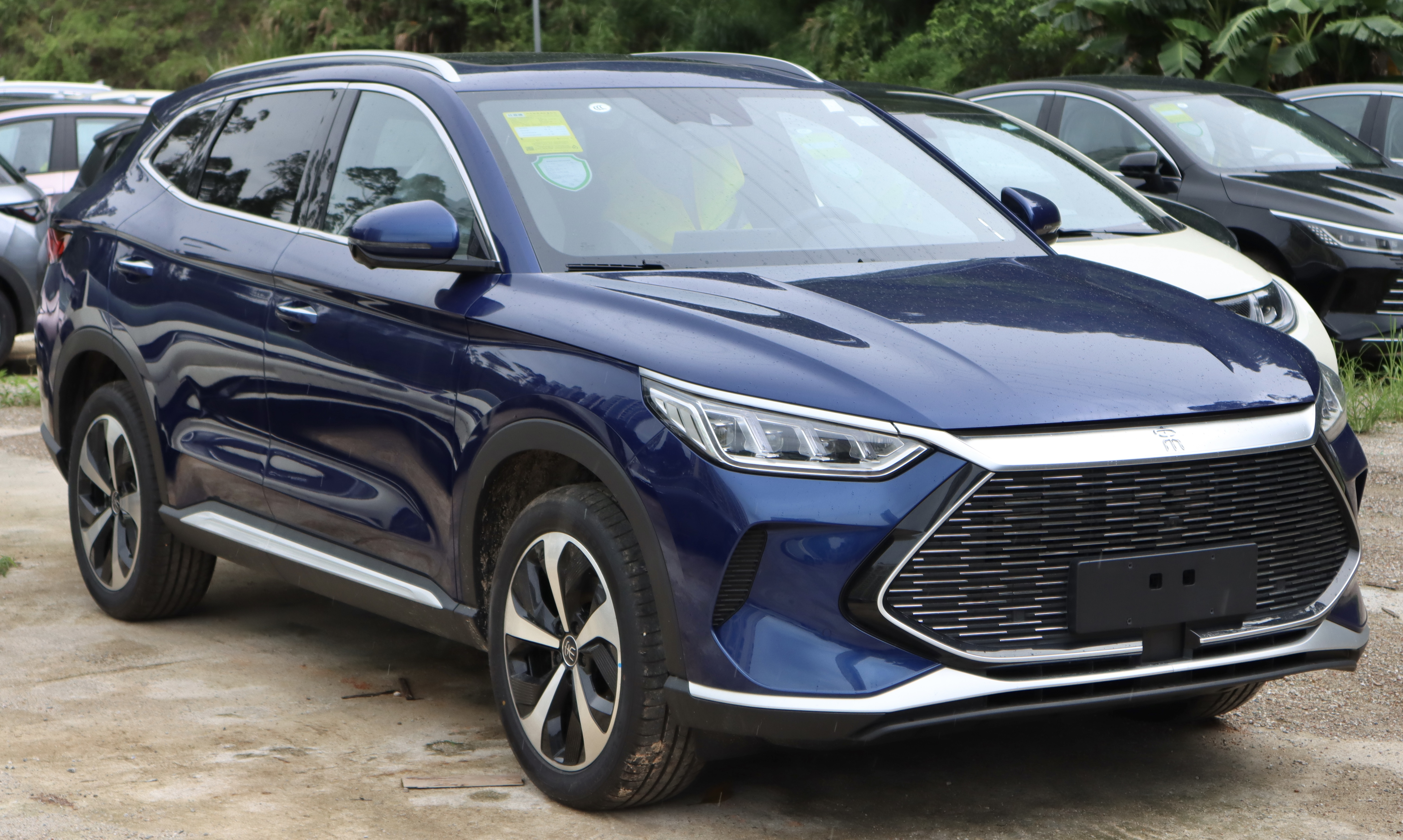
- 2020 BYD Song Plus DM-i

Overview
- Manufacturer: BYD Auto
- Production: 2015–present

Body and chassis
- Class: Compact SUV
- Body style: 5-door crossover SUV

The BYD Song (Chinese: 比亚迪宋, after the Song dynasty) is a series of compact SUVs produced by BYD Auto since 2015.

The Song nameplate consists of several different models. It includes the original first-generation Song, later renamed to Song Classic and was sold until 2019. Another versions are the slightly larger Song Pro was introduced in 2019, followed by the more upmarket Song Plus in 2020, a larger electric vehicle called the Song L EV since 2023, and a plug-in hybrid called the Song L DM-i. The Song nameplate is also adopted by the Song Max compact MPV. Since 2024, the Song Plus is exported overseas as the BYD Seal U and BYD Sealion 6.

Similar to other BYD models, the Song has been available in petrol, plug-in hybrid DM (Dual Mode) system, and pure EV powertrains. The petrol versions were discontinued in March 2022 as BYD ended ICE vehicle production. The Song is part of Dynasty series product line, although since 2022 the Song Plus is offered through the Ocean Network dealerships.

The Song is BYD's best-selling nameplate, and one of the most popular SUV in China by ranking first in the SUV segment in 2022. In that year, the Song sold 478,811 units, surpassing the Tesla Model Y and Haval H6 in the market.

== Song (2015) ==
BYD Song
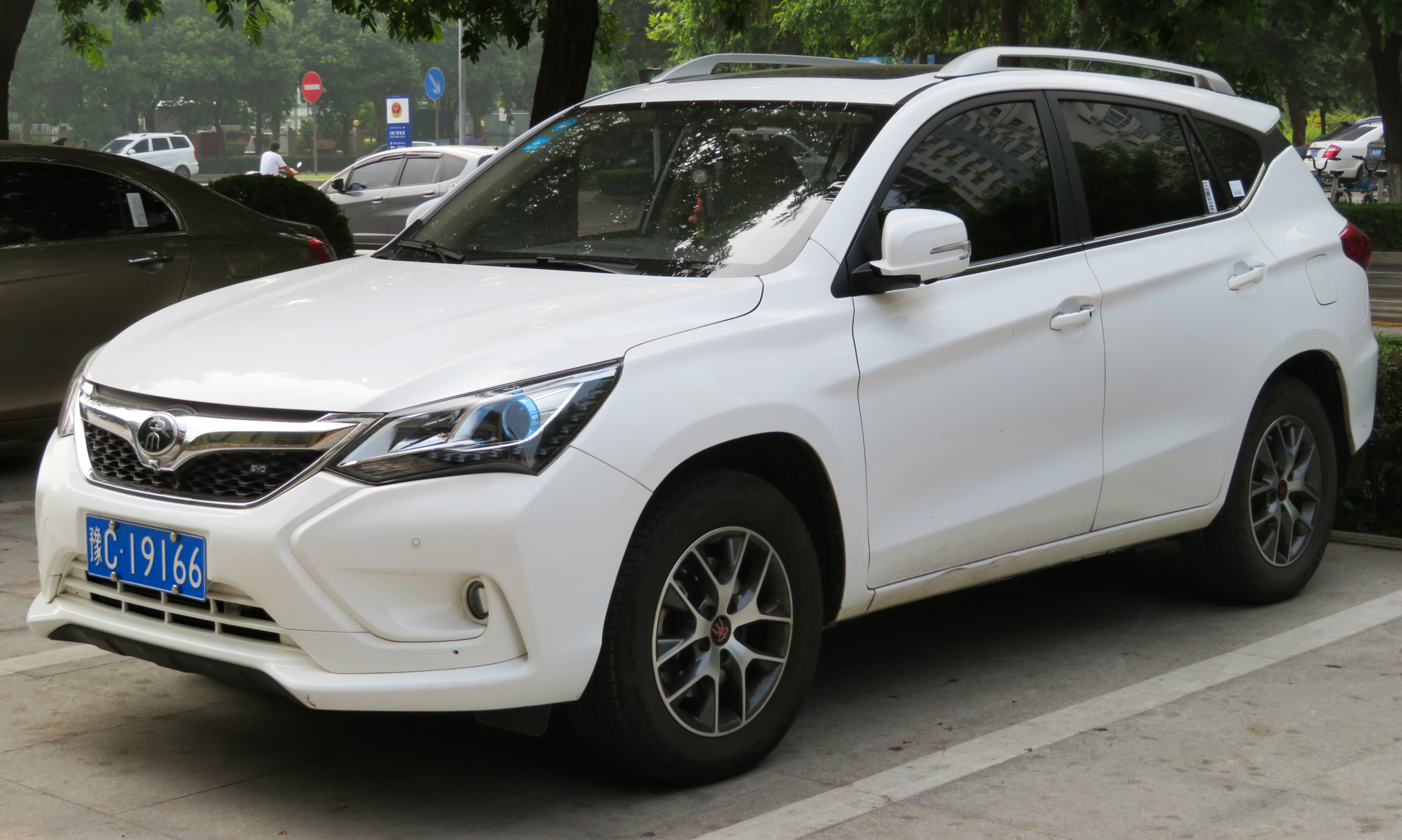

Overview
- Also called: BYD S5 (Egypt)
- Production: 2015–2022

Powertrain
- Engine: 1.5 L BYD476ZQA I4 (turbo petrol); 2.0 L BYD487ZQA I4 (turbo petrol)
- Electric motor: 218 hp 310 Nm electric motor(EV300/EV400)
- Transmission: 6 speed manual 6 speed DCT

Dimensions
- Wheelbase: 2,660 mm (104.7 in)
- Length: 4,565 mm (179.7 in)
- Width: 1,830 mm (72.0 in)
- Height: 1,720 mm (67.7 in)

The original BYD Song debuted on the Shanghai Auto Show in April 2015, and went on sale in October 2015. It was positioned below the mid-size S6 crossover, and is BYD's first entry to the compact crossover market. Prior to its introduction, the petrol-powered first-generation Song was planned to be marketed as the BYD S3, similar to the petrol powered F3 compact sedan and S6 mid-size crossover, which for its hybrid variants were renamed to the Qin and Tang using the Chinese dynasty naming system. However, BYD reversed course shortly before its launch, and S3 was named the Song for all variants including the ICE engined version, plug-in hybrid version, and electric versions.

Two powertrains was offered at launch. A 1.5-litre turbo-charged petrol engine capable of producing 154 hp (115 kW; 156 PS) and 240 N⋅m (177 lb⋅ft) of torque and a 2.0-litre turbocharged petrol engine capable of producing 205 hp (153 kW; 208 PS) and 320 N⋅m (236 lb⋅ft) of torque. The 1.5-litre engine could be had with either a 6-speed manual gearbox or a 6-speed automatic gearbox while the 2.0-litre engine could only be had with a 6-speed DCT gearbox. Early models with S3 badging has black graphic details on the front bumpers and regular BYD badge instead of the single body color and Dynasty-badging Song.

Later in 2018, a second facelift updating the BYD Song with the new "Dragon Face" design language.

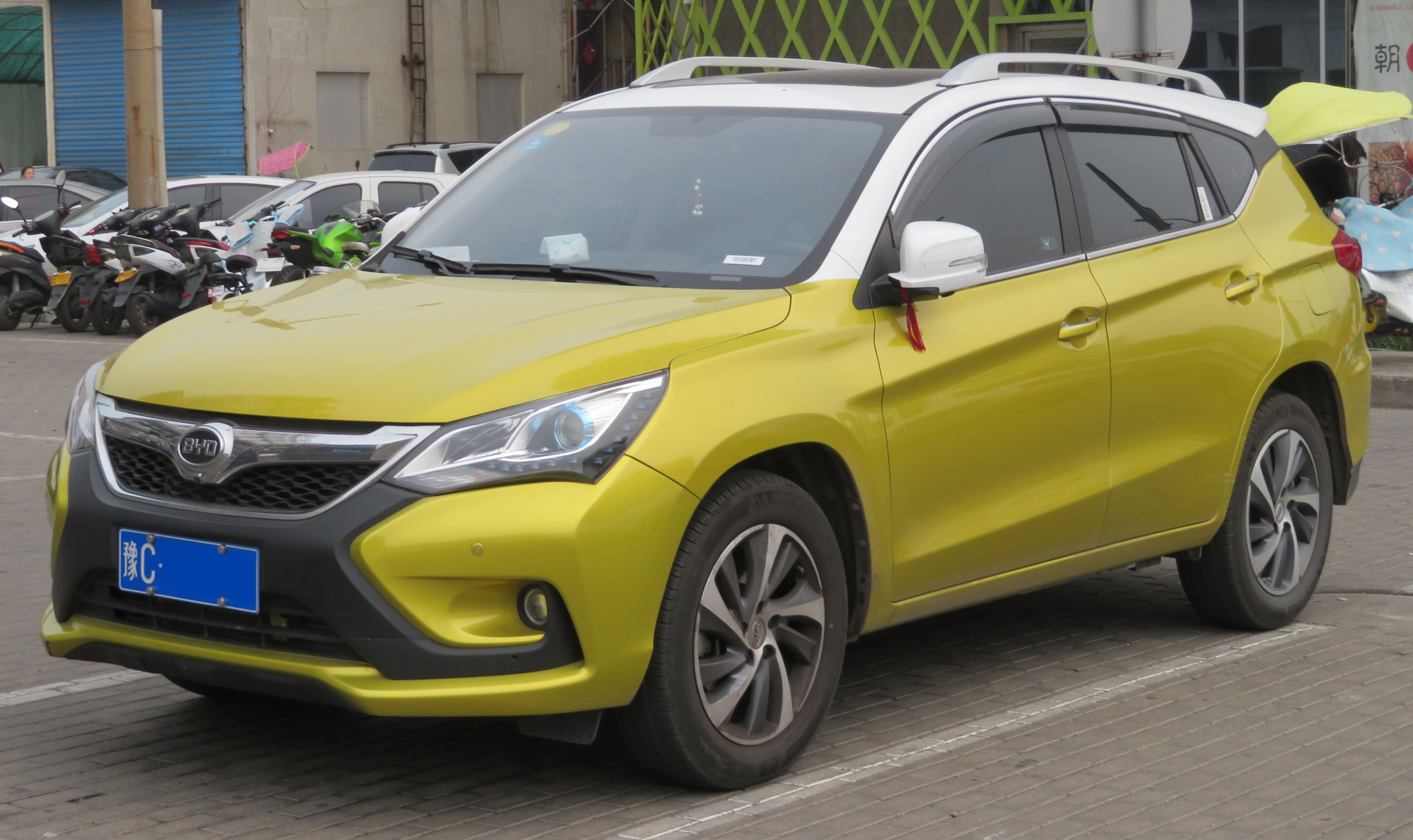
2017 BYD Song

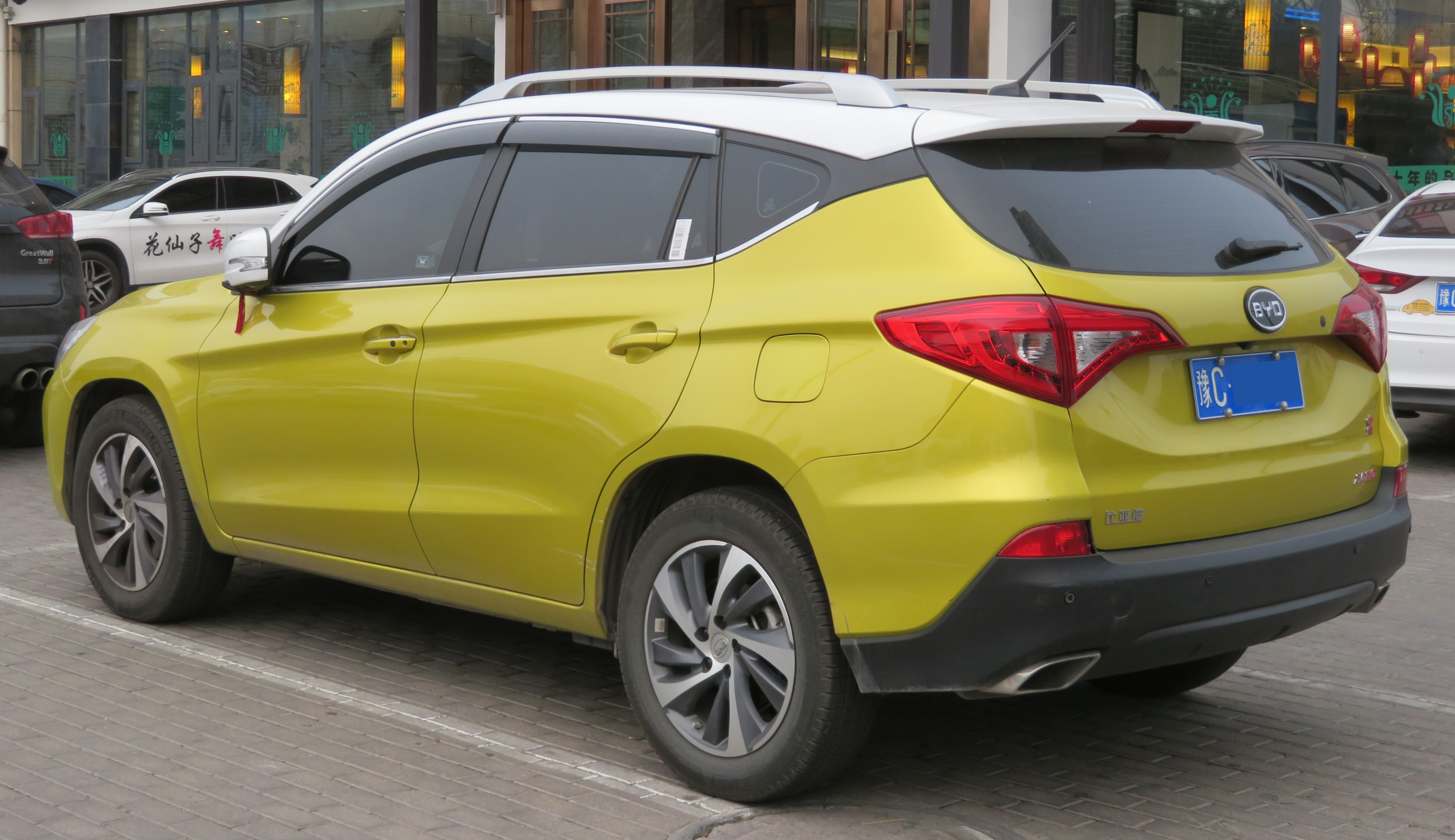
Rear view

=== Song DM ===
BYD introduced the Song DM (Dual Mode) plug-in hybrid in April 2017, following the F3DM compact car and F6DM prototype. The Song DM is nearly identical to the regular Song apart from the badging. Song DM is capable of utilizing both the HEV and EV modes with the 1.5-litre turbo engine and dual motors, delivering a range up to 80 km (50 mi). The plug-in outputs up to 333 kW (453 PS; 447 hp) and a torque of 740 N⋅m (546 lb⋅ft) in HEV mode and manages 0–100 km/h (0–62 mph) in 4.9 seconds. Fuel efficiency is 1.4 L/100 km (170 mpg_{‑US}; 71 km/L).

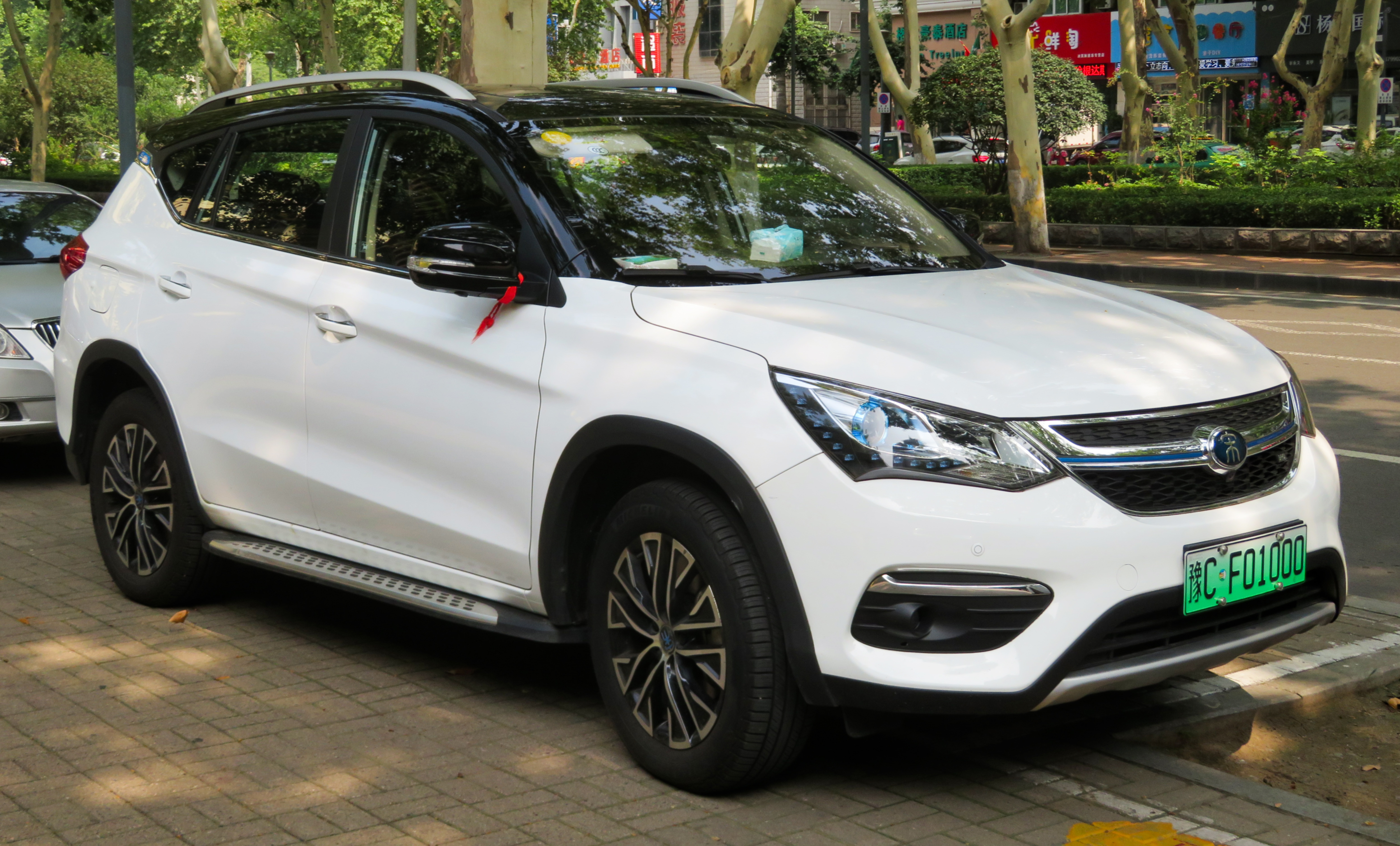
BYD Song DM

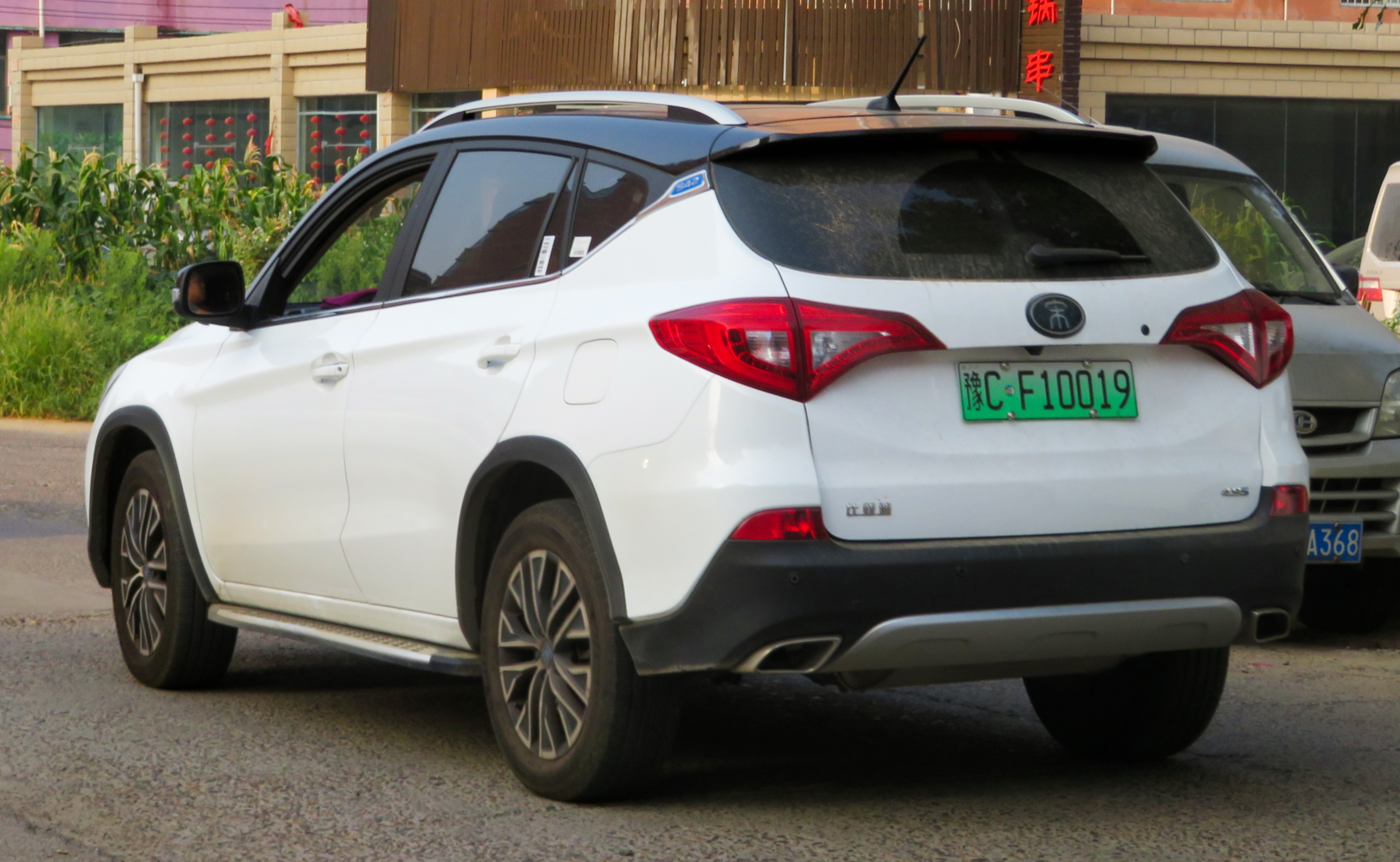
Rear view

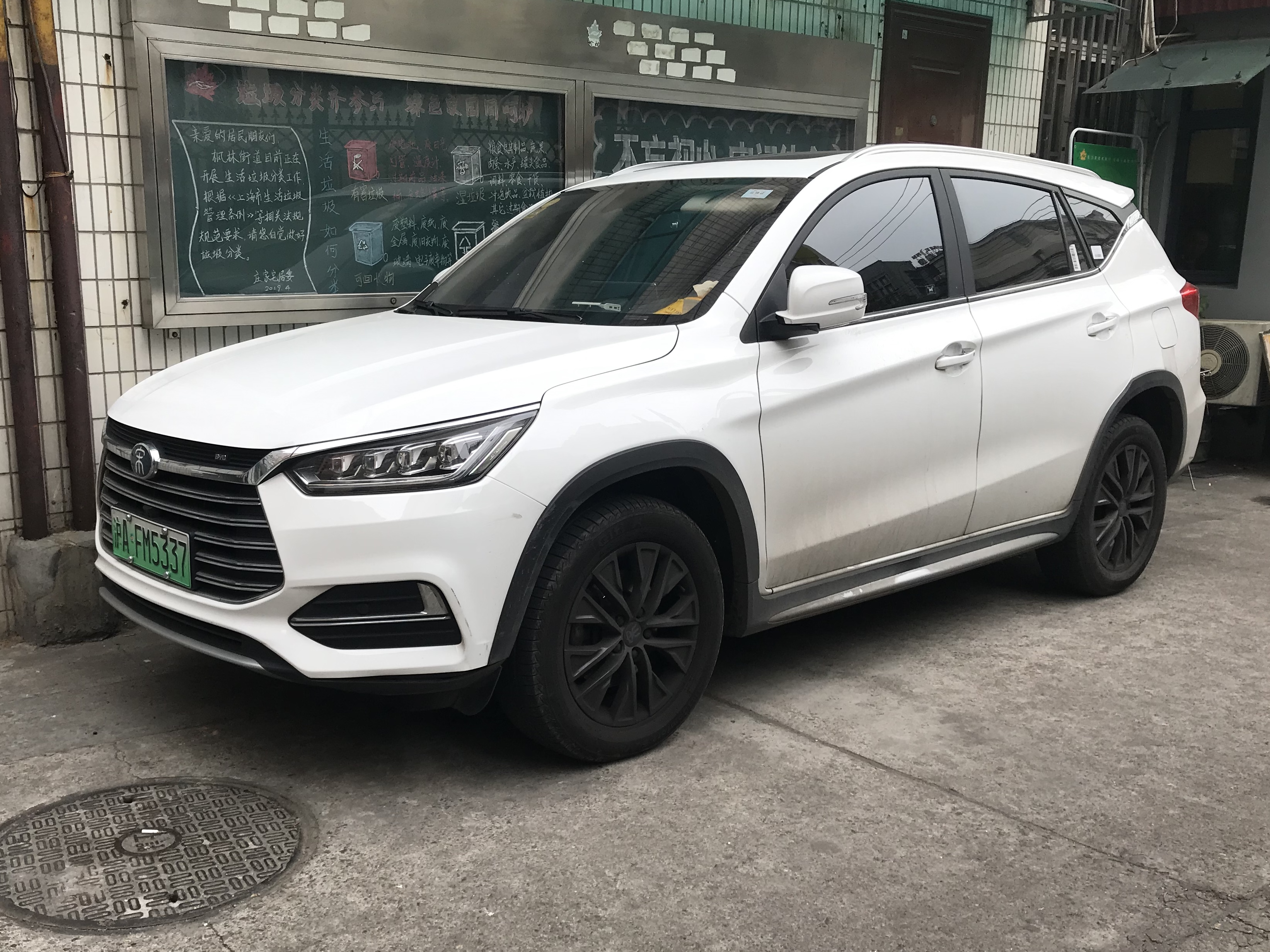
BYD Song DM (facelift)

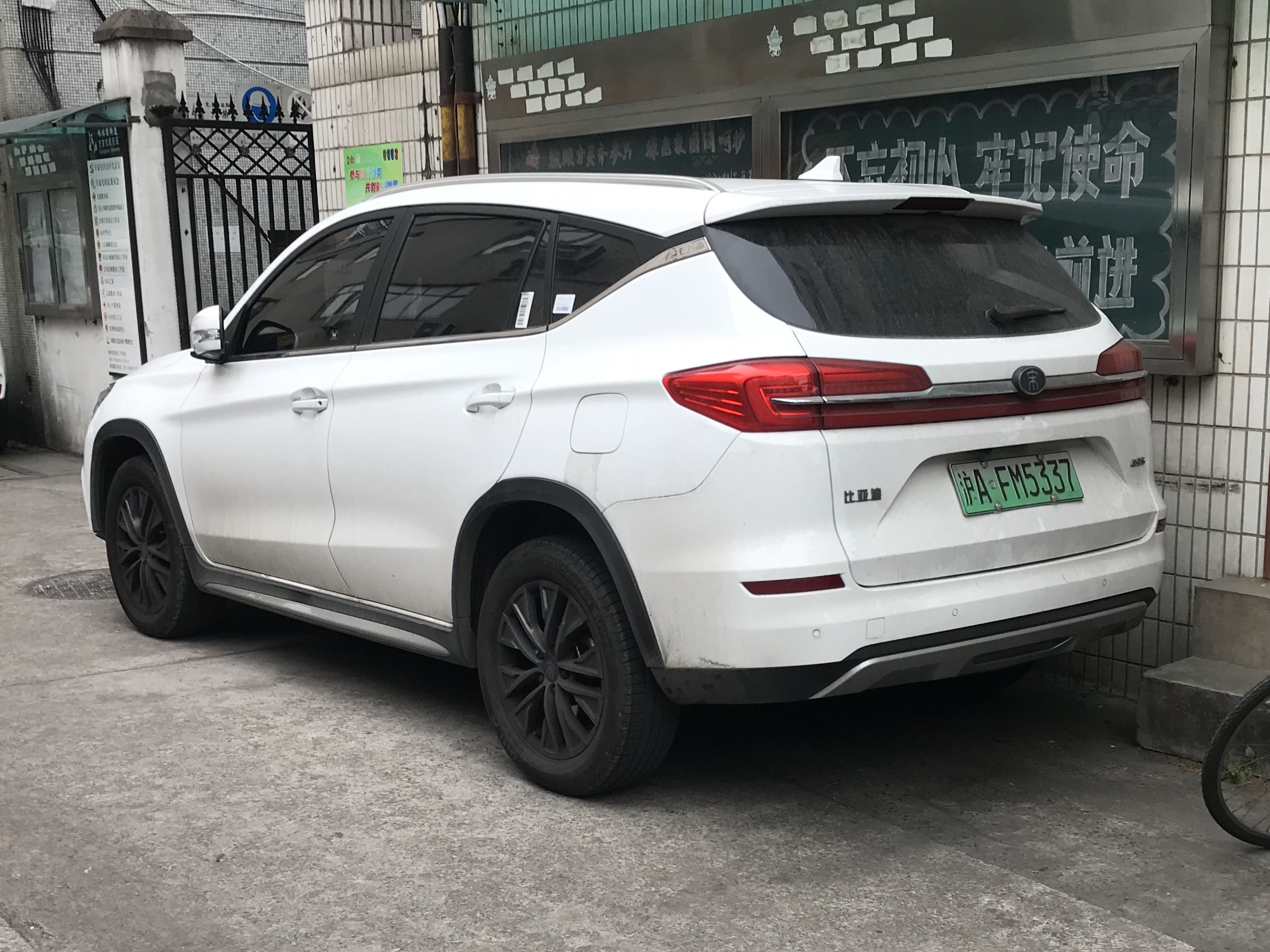
Rear view

=== Song EV300 and EV400 ===
The Song EV300 and the Song EV400 are both electric versions of the Song based on the regular petrol-powered BYD Song, and both use 218 hp (163 kW) and 310 N⋅m (229 lb⋅ft) electric motors. The Song EV300 has a NEDC range of 270 km (168 mi) and a 60 km/h (37 mph) range of 300 km (186 mi) running on a 48 kWh battery pack while the Song EV400 runs on 62 kWh ones. As for the exterior appearances, the EV300 is identical to the regular Song and Song DM, while the EV400 received redesigned bumpers.

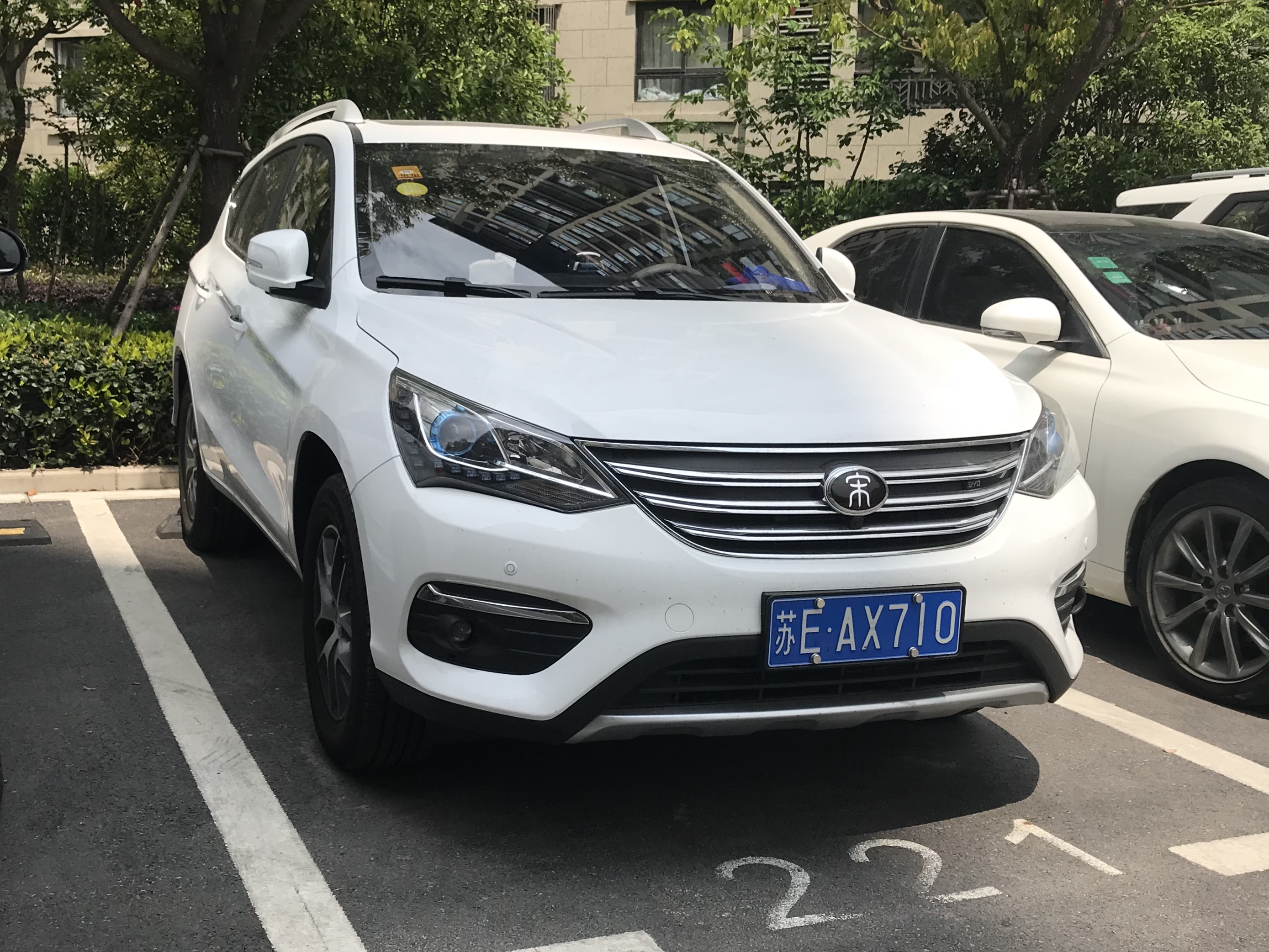
BYD Song EV400

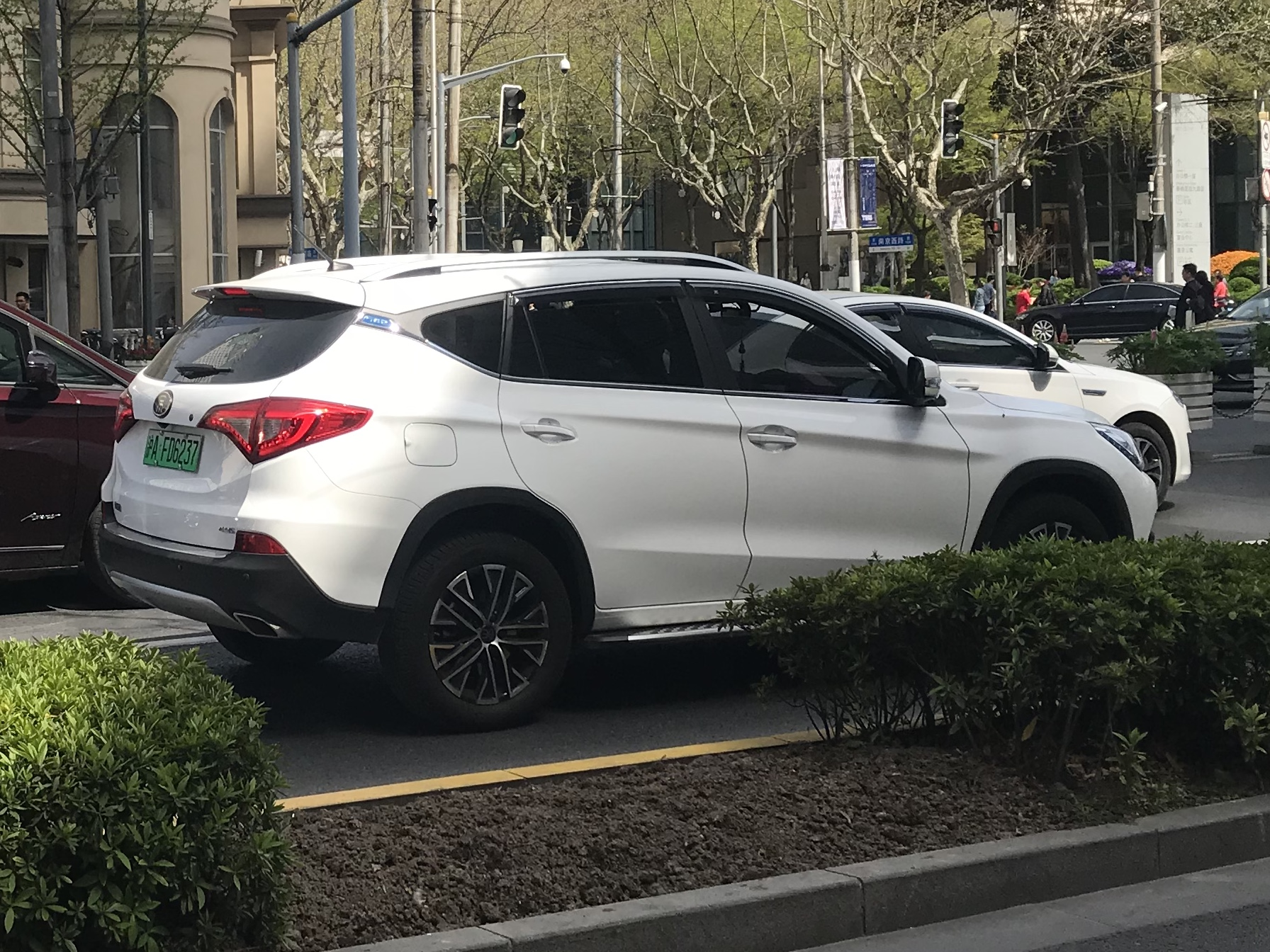
Rear view

=== 2018 facelift ===
A facelift was launched in 2018 featuring the new BYD dragon face and connected tail lamps. Despite being marketed as a "brand new generation", the 2018 model shares the same body as the previous models.

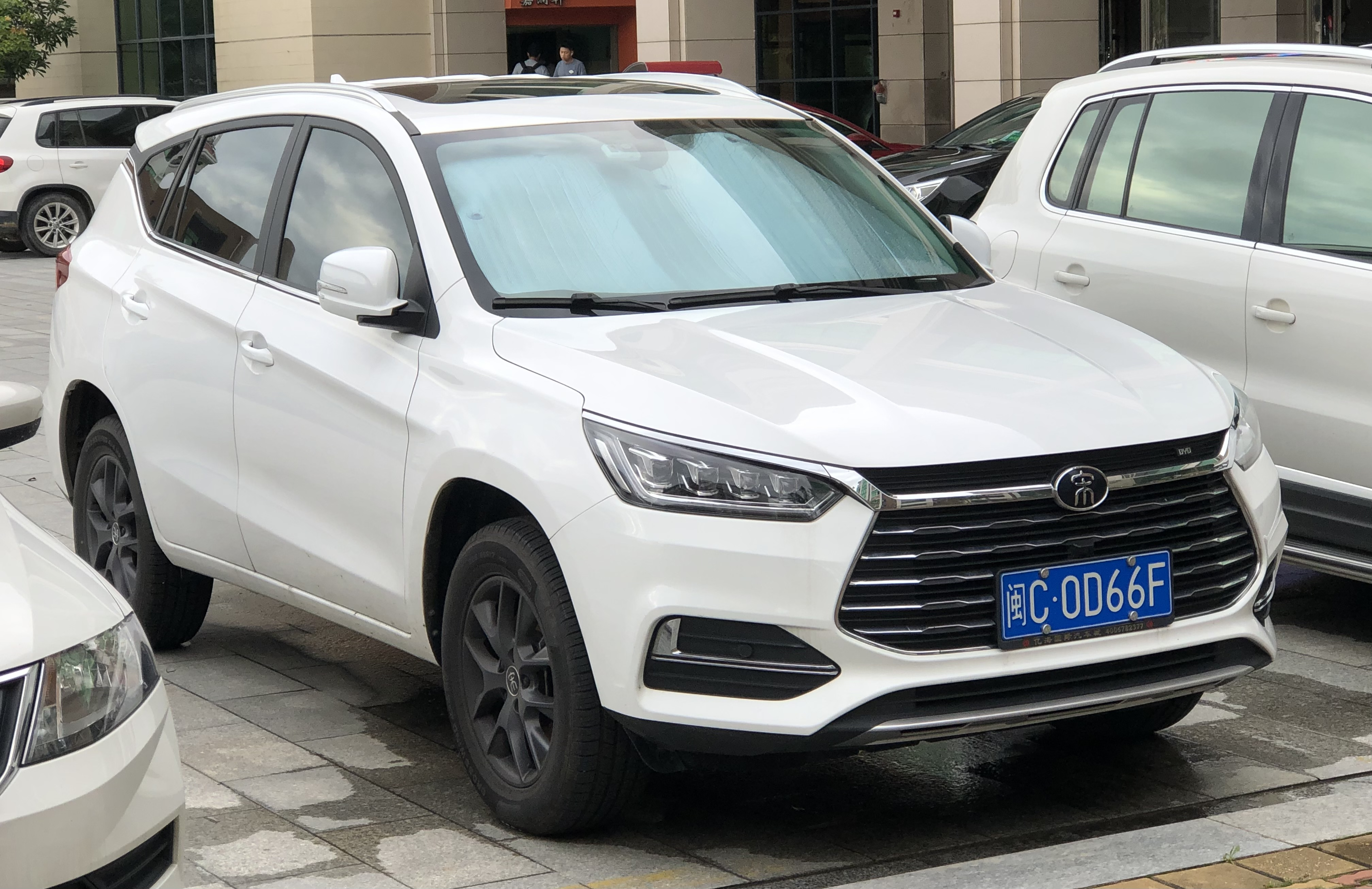
2018 facelift

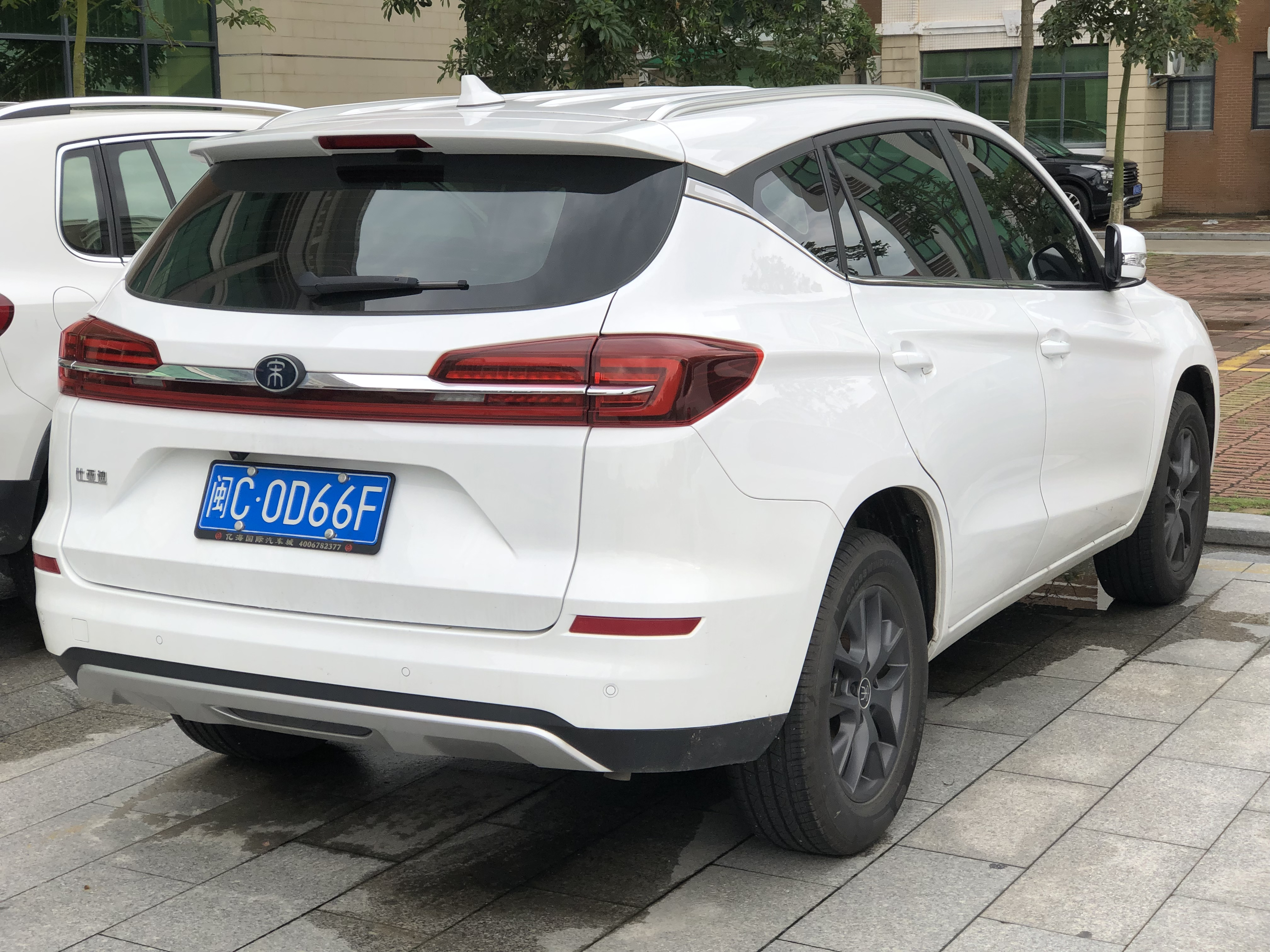
Rear view

== Song Pro (2019) ==
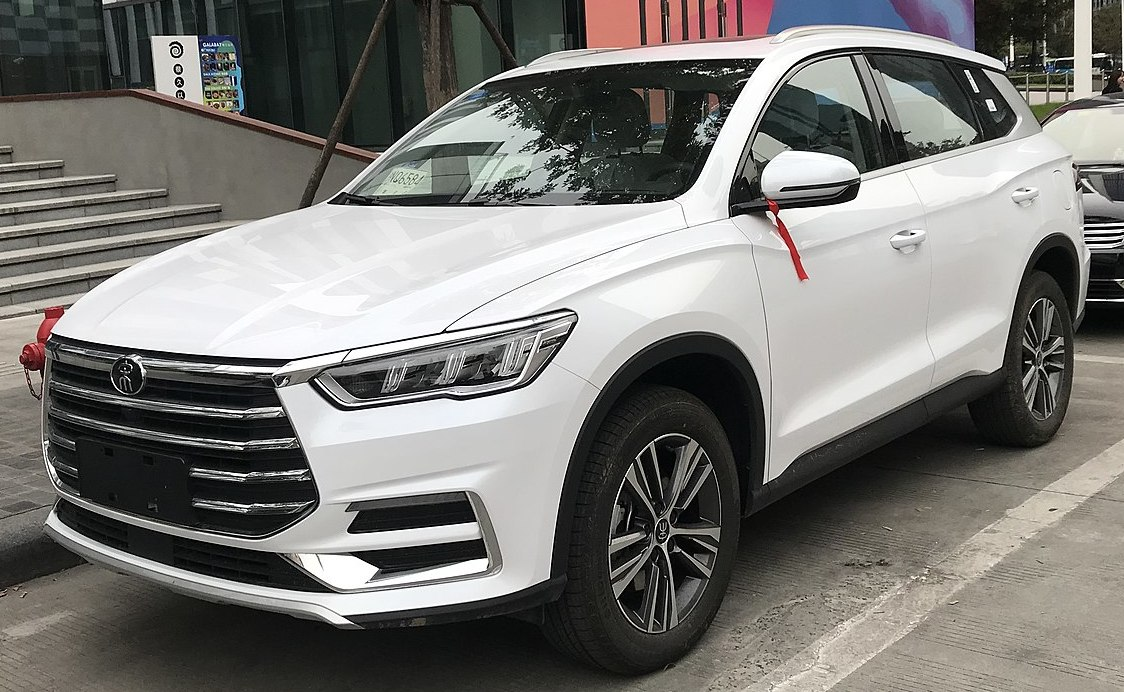
2019 BYD Song Pro

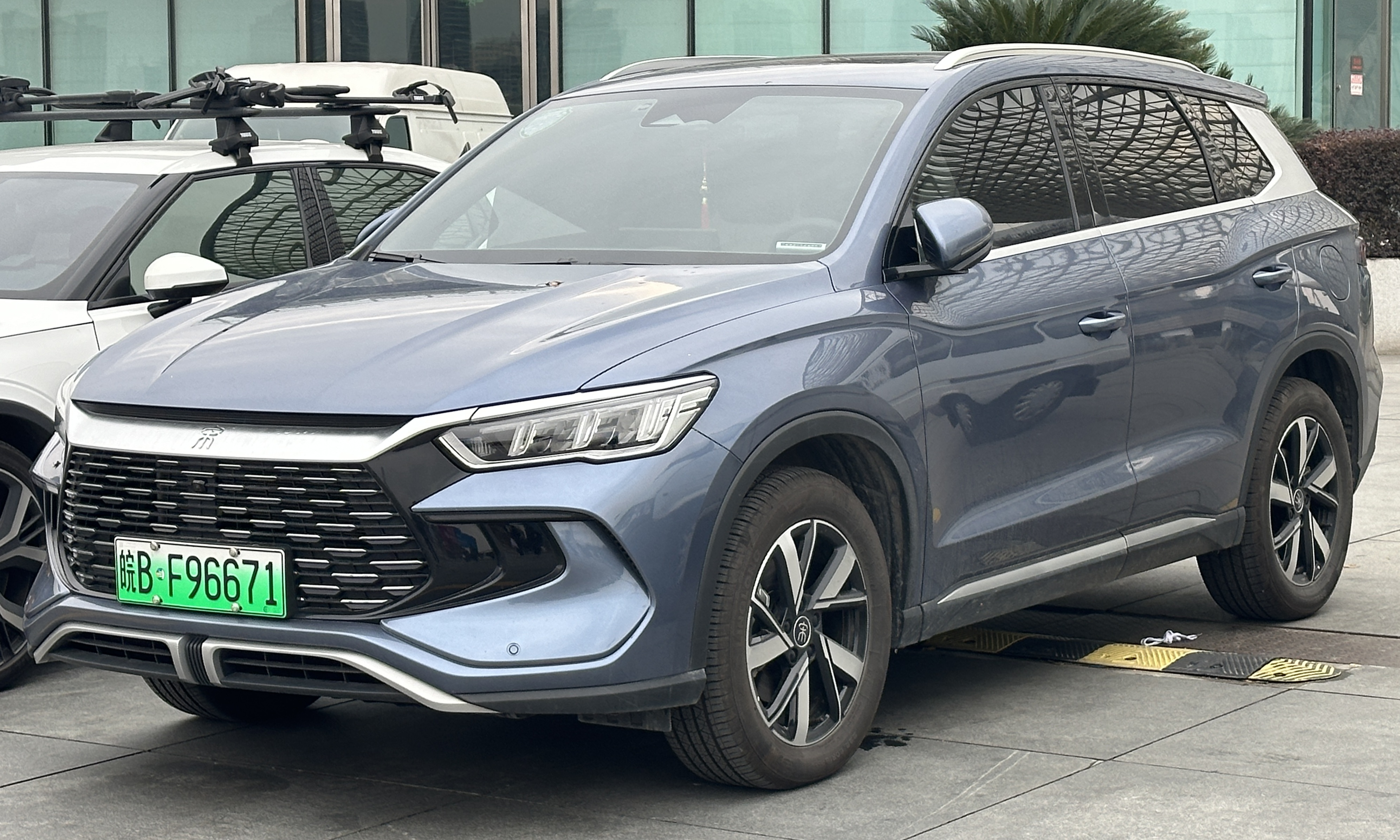
2023 BYD Song Pro DM-i

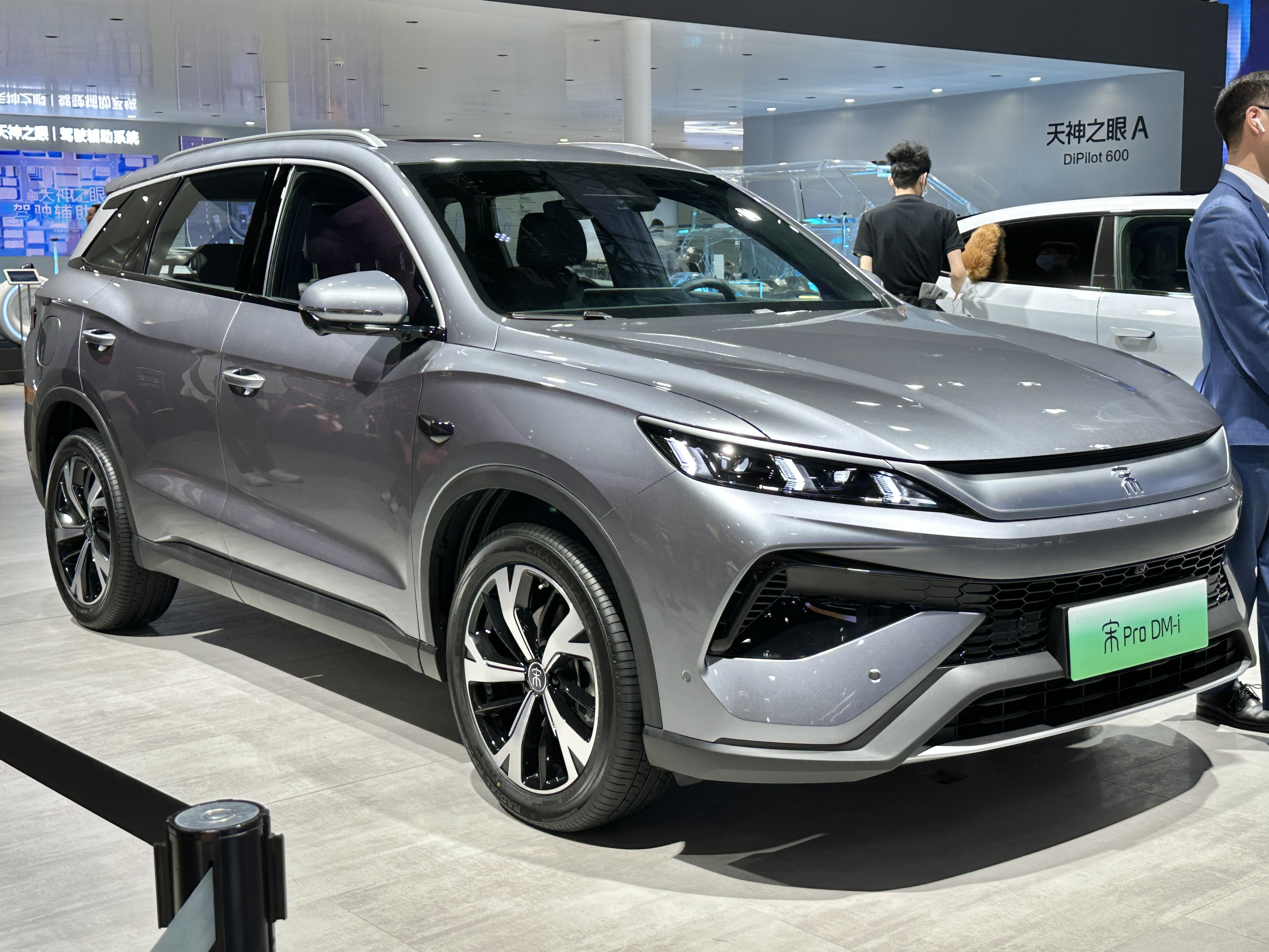
2024 BYD Song Pro DM-i

The Song Plus is a compact crossover SUV produced since 2019, which was offered alongside the first-generation Song until 2022. It was initially offered in three variants: an internal combustion engine (ICE) version with a 1.5-litre turbocharged petrol engine, the plug-in hybrid Song Pro DM and the battery electric Song Pro EV. Since 2022, only the plug-in hybrid version remains available, which has been upgraded to the newer DM-i plug-in hybrid powertrain.

The Song Pro became available in global markets in 2024, mostly in Latin American countries. In Philippines and Australia, it is known as the Sealion 5 DM-i.

== Song Plus (2020) ==
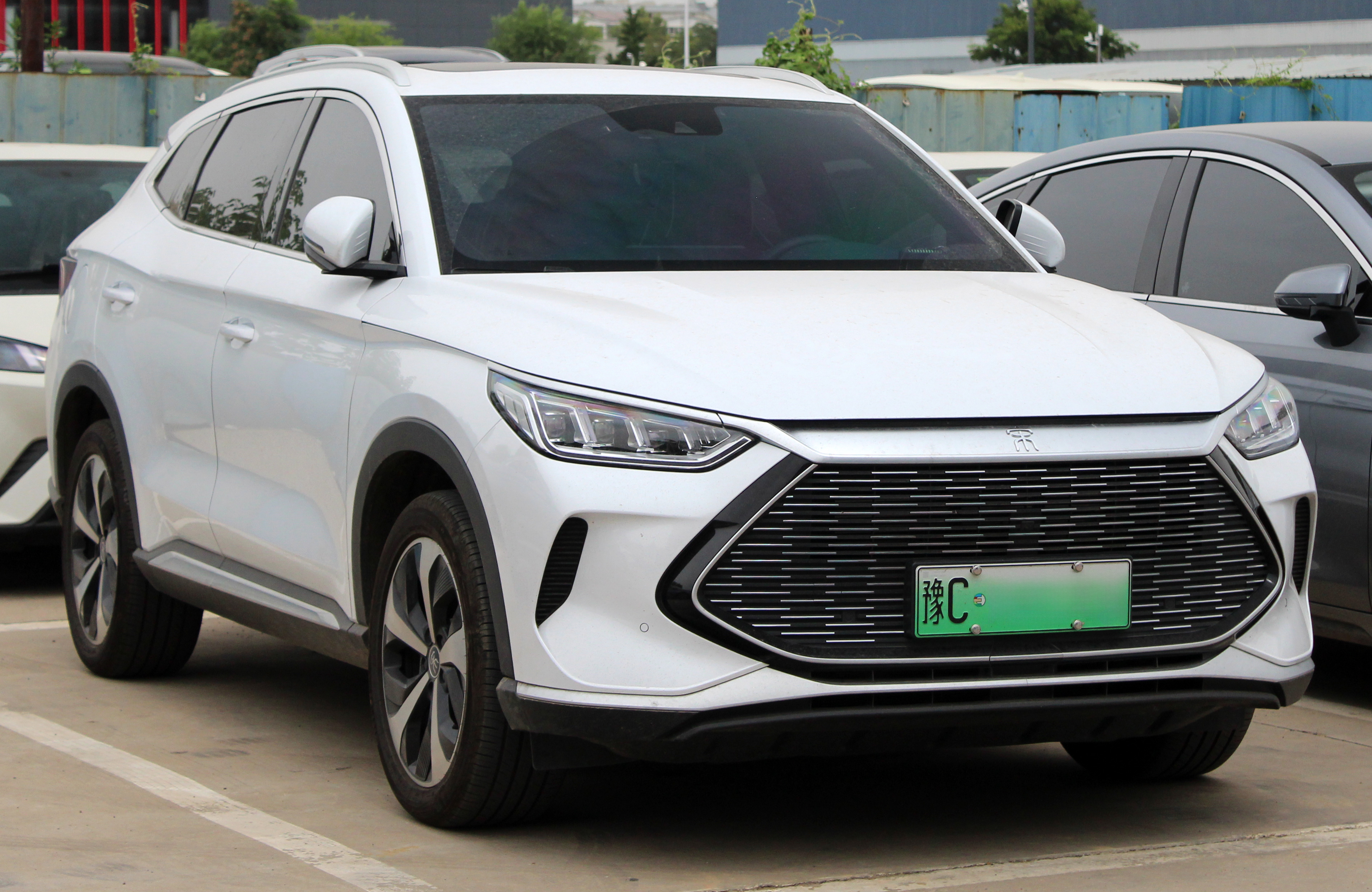
2022 BYD Song Plus DM-i

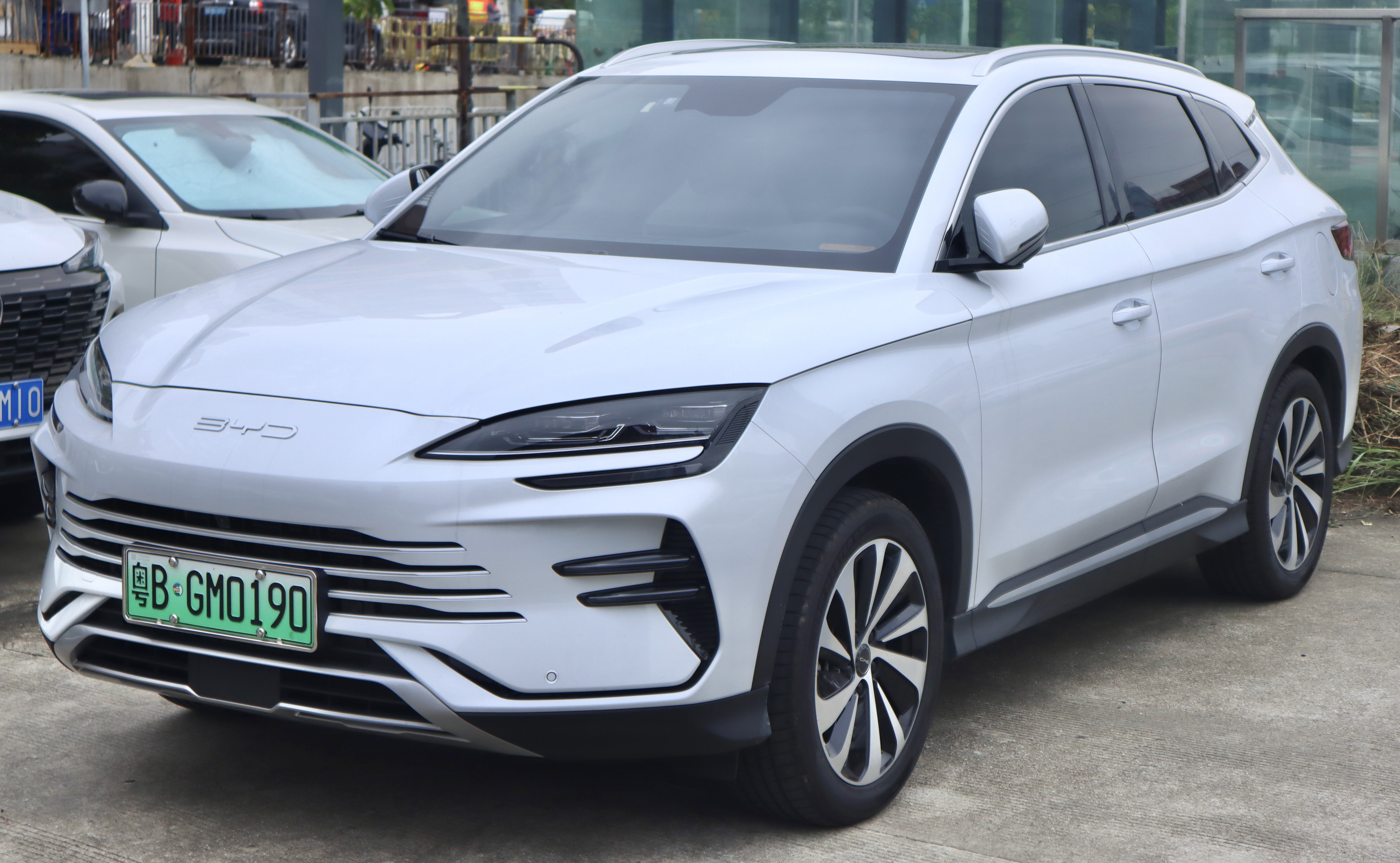
2023 BYD Song Plus DM-i

The Song Plus is a larger compact crossover SUV produced since 2020. Initially available solely as an internal combustion engine (ICE) vehicle with a 1.5-litre turbocharged petrol engine, in 2021 BYD introduced the plug-in hybrid Song Plus DM-i and the battery electric Song Plus EV. The petrol model was phased out in 2022 after BYD ended production of internal combustion engine (ICE) vehicles.

In 2023, BYD introduced the Song Plus EV as the BYD Seal U in Europe. The plug-in hybrid Seal U DM-i was introduced later in 2024. In mid-2024, the model was introduced in Australia, New Zealand, the Philippines, and Thailand as the BYD Sealion 6 DM-i.

== Song L EV (2023) ==
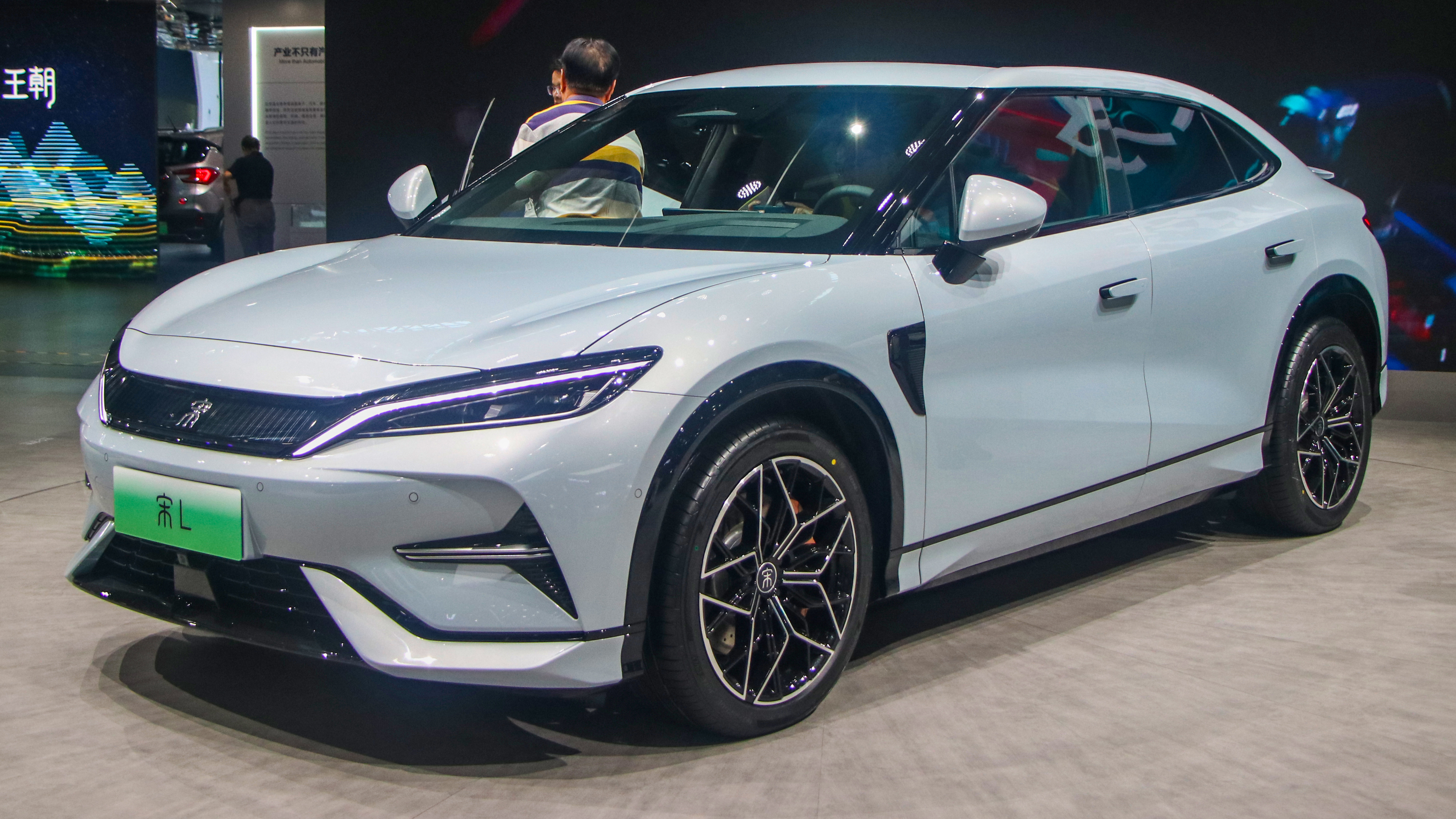
2023 BYD Song L

The Song L EV is a larger and lower SUV in the mid-size SUV segment (B-class in China) using the Song nameplate that was produced since 2023. The Song L EV is based on the e-Platform 3.0.

== Song L DM-i (2024) ==
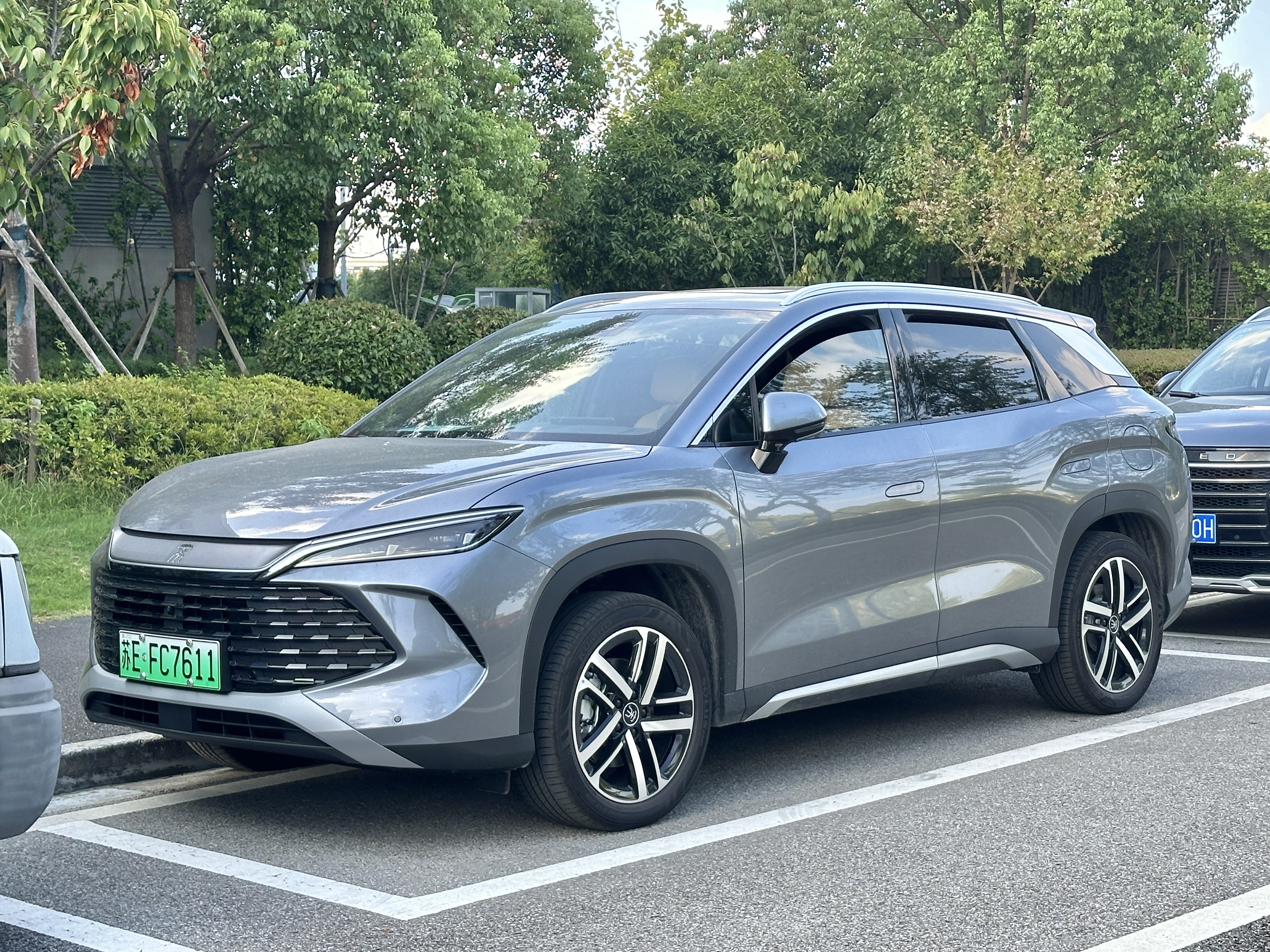
2024 BYD Song L DM-i

The Song L DM-i is a mid-size plug-in hybrid SUV that went on sale in July 2024 in China. It is an entirely different vehicle compared to the Song L EV, with minimal resemblance in styling and based on a different platform. Instead, it is similarly sized to the Song Plus, which has been phased out. It is equipped with the DM-i 5.0 system first introduced with the Qin L and Seal 06.

== Song Ultra (2026) ==
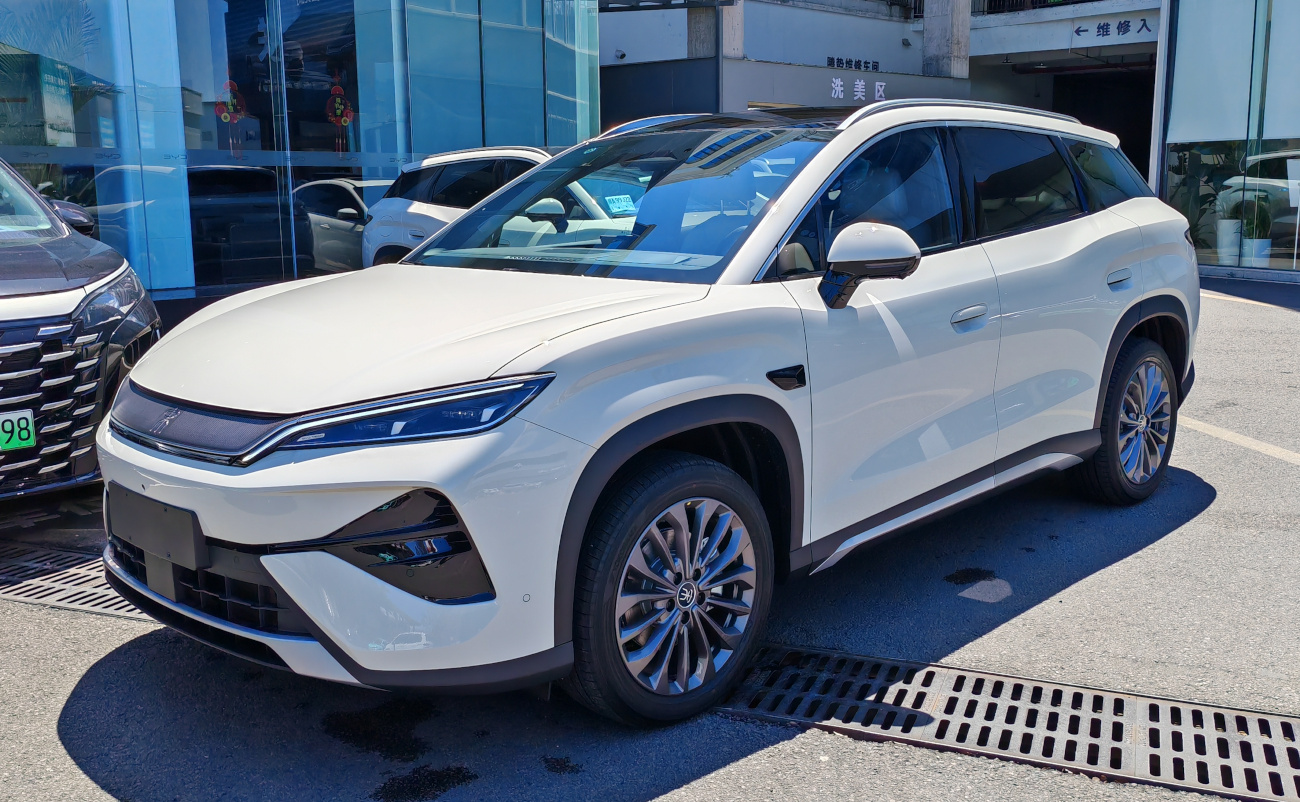
2026 BYD Song Ultra EV

The Song Ultra is an variant of Song L DM-i as a mid-size battery-electric and plug-in hybrid SUV, with longer wheelbase, and revised front and rear fascia which increases its overall size.

== Song Max (2017) ==
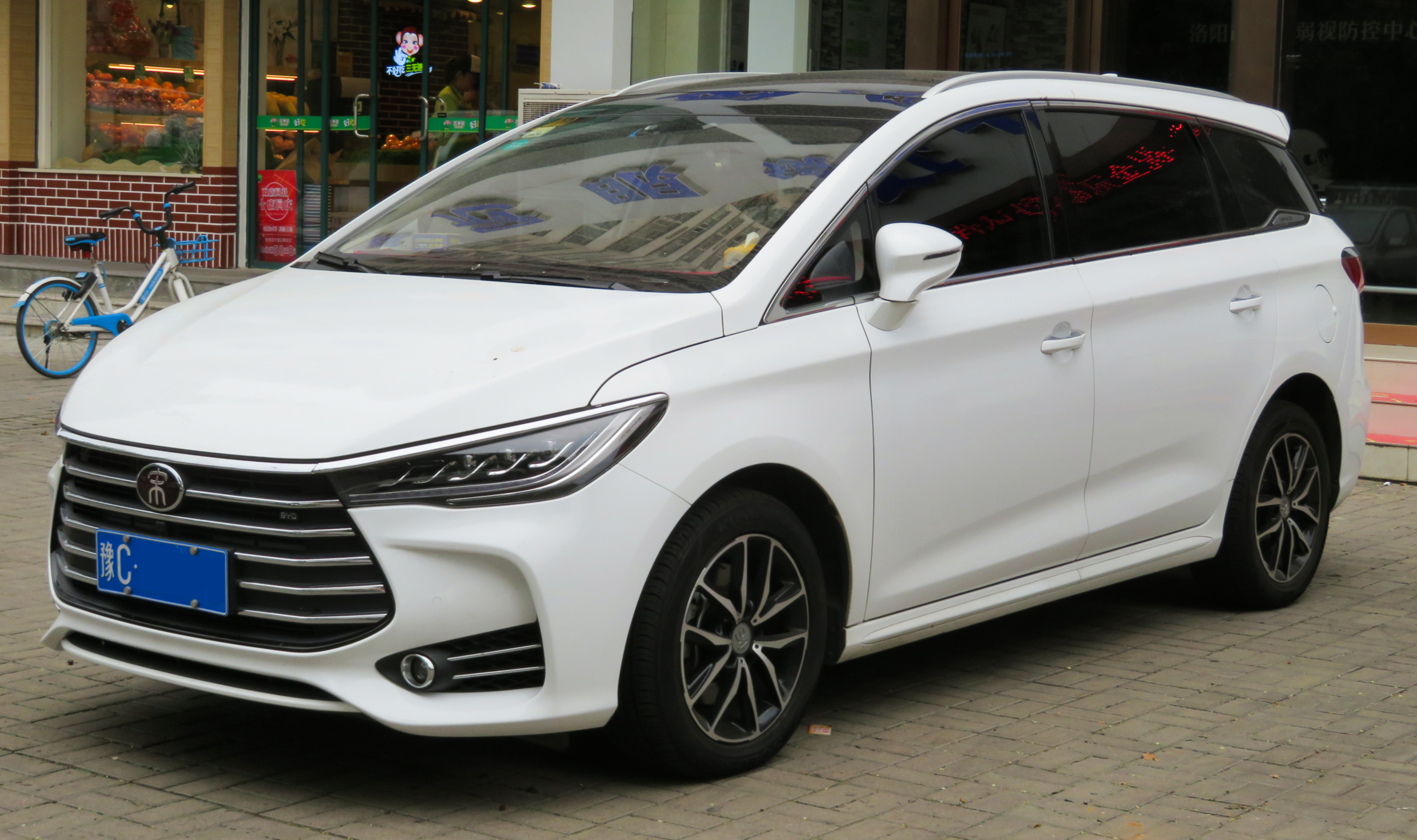
2018 BYD Song Max

The Song Max is a compact multi-purpose vehicle (MPV) using the Song nameplate that was produced since 2017. It was available as a petrol-powered model, then battery electric and plug-in hybrid in 2019. Since 2022, it is solely available in a DM-i plug-in hybrid version. A simplified, battery electric version of the Song Max is marketed as the second-generation BYD e6 for ride-hailing and taxi fleet use. Since 2024, an upgraded version of the e6 went on sale as the BYD M6 in some export markets.

== Sales ==
Year	China													
Year	Song			Song Pro			Song Plus			Song Max		Song L		Total
Year	ICE	DM	EV	ICE	DM	EV	ICE	DM-i	EV	ICE	DM	DM-i	EV	Total
2015	13,769	—	—	—	—	—	—	—	—	—	—	—	—	13,769
2016	100,042	—	—	—	—	—	—	—	—	—	—	—	—	100,042
2017	101,037	—	—	—	—	—	—	—	—	30,390	—	—	—	131,427
2018	43,374	—	—	—	—	—	—	—	—	141,068	—	—	—	184,442
2019	85,470	12,585	—	—	—	—	—	—	—	68,175	—	—	—	166,230
2020	79,031	3,106	3,939	80,854	5,272	6,820	7,108	—	—	23,410	1,982	—	—	204,414
2021	92,022				79,508	29,340	108,848			9,935	733	—	—	211,538
2022	3,505				20,323			388,048	66,935		11,037	—	—	489,848
2023					209,690			296,294	93,919		3,720	—	4,988	608,611
2024	—	—	—	—	241,598	—	—	266,189	152,285	—	291	109,194	46,683	816,240
2025	—	—	—	—	180,661	—	—	108,295	91,981	—	1	137,120	14,508	532,556

== See also ==
- List of BYD Auto vehicles
