= BYD G6 =

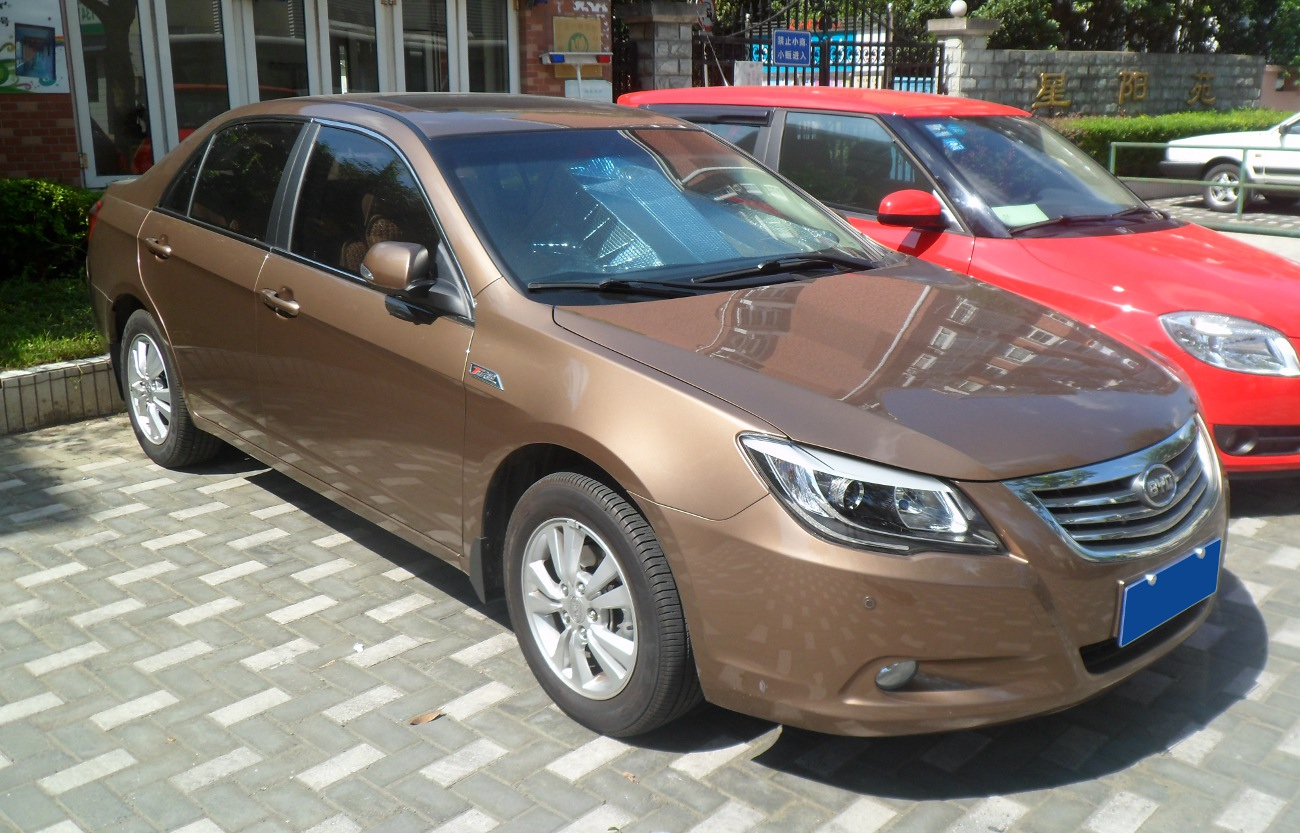

Overview
- Manufacturer: BYD
- Also called: BYD Sirui
- Production: 2011–2018

Body and chassis
- Class: Mid-size car (D-segment)
- Body style: 4-door saloon
- Layout: Front engine, front-wheel-drive

Powertrain
- Engine: 1.5 L BYD476ZQA I4 (turbo petrol); 2.0 L BYD483QB I4 (petrol)
- Transmission: 5-speed manual 6-speed DCT

Dimensions
- Wheelbase: 2,745 mm (108.1 in)
- Length: 4,860 mm (191.3 in)
- Width: 1,825 mm (71.9 in)
- Height: 1,463 mm (57.6 in)

Chronology
- Predecessor: BYD F6
- Successor: BYD Han

The BYD G6 is a mid-sized four-door saloon produced by the Chinese manufacturer BYD between 2011 and 2018. It was first released in China on September 26, 2011, as the official successor to the BYD F6 and, like its predecessor, it was available exclusively as a 4-door sedan 3-volume body. In October 2014, The model underwent a major facelift. It was replaced in 2020 by the BYD Han.

== G6 ==
The G6 is available with a choice of two four-cylinder petrol engines: a BYD designed all-aluminum-alloy 1.5 L (1497 cc) turbo (called TID) producing 113 kW (154 PS; 152 bhp) and 240 N⋅m (177 lb⋅ft) mated with a 6-speed dual clutch automatic or a Mitsubishi 483QB 2.0L (1991 cc) producing 103 kW (140 PS; 138 bhp) and 186 N⋅m (137 lb⋅ft) with a 5-speed manual.

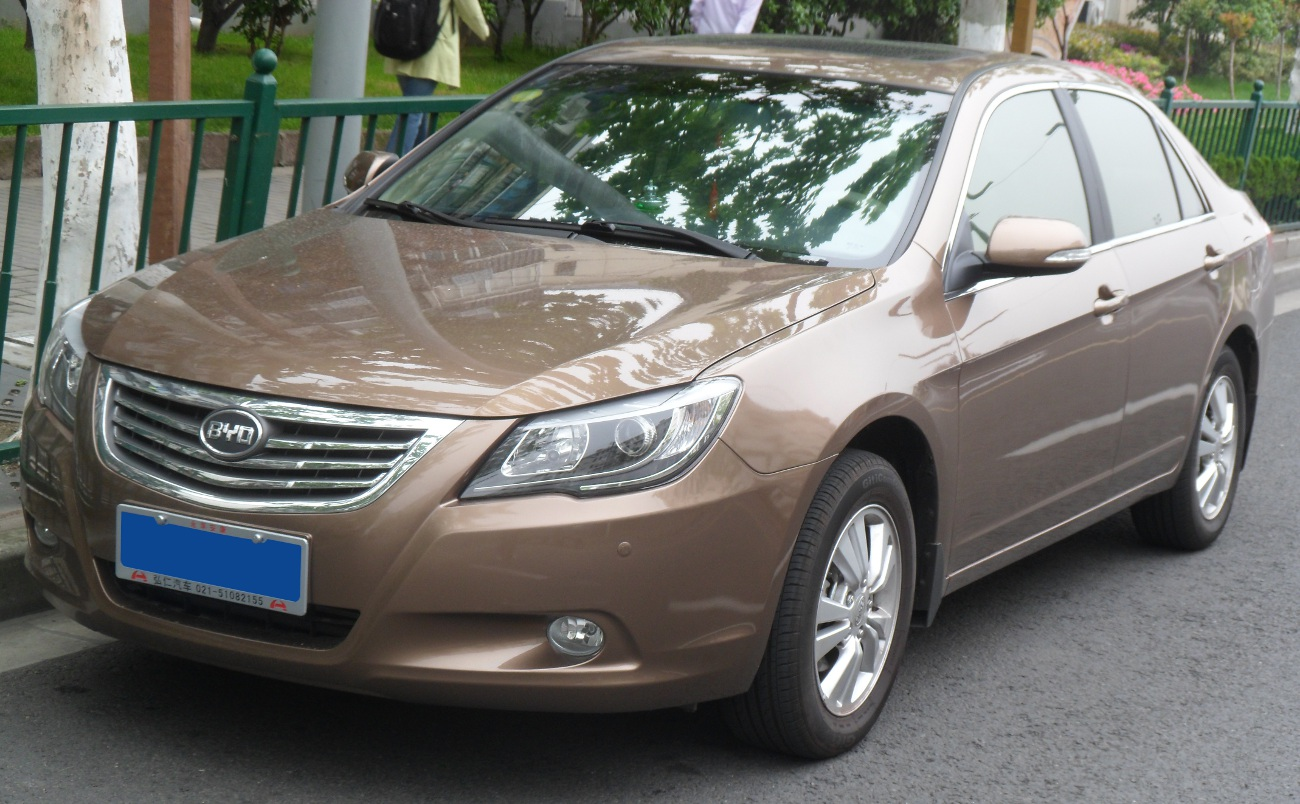
BYD G6 front.

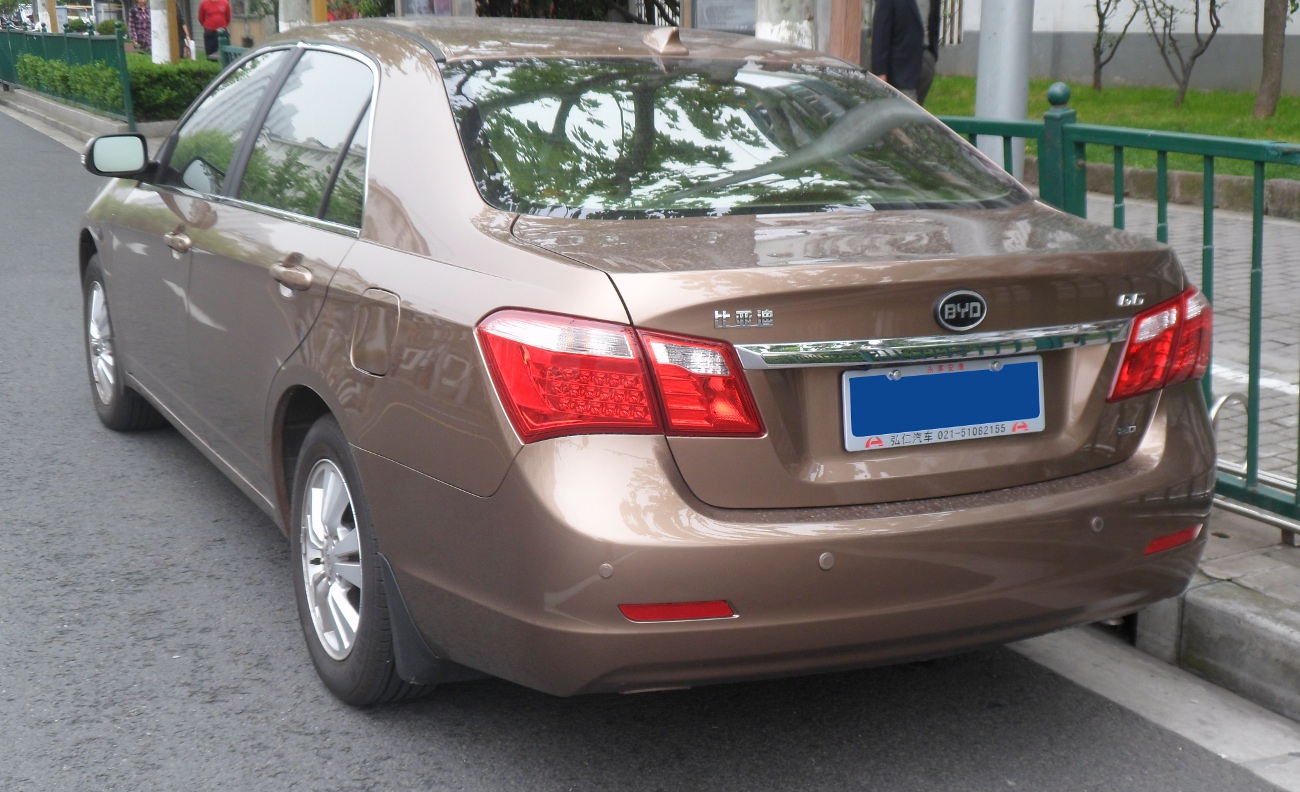
BYD G6 rear.

== Sirui ==
Just like the Surui trim of BYD F3, Sirui is a more premium version of the G6, with different styling and configurations.

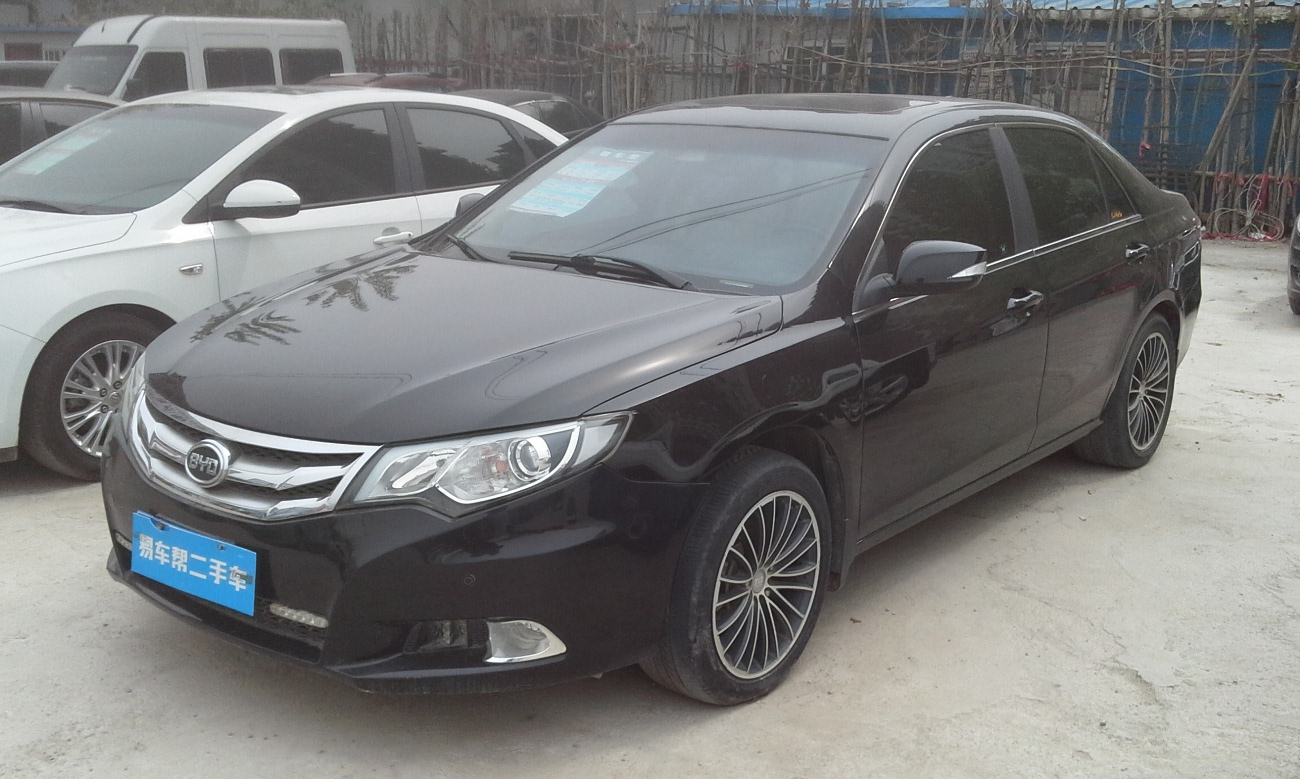
BYD Sirui front.

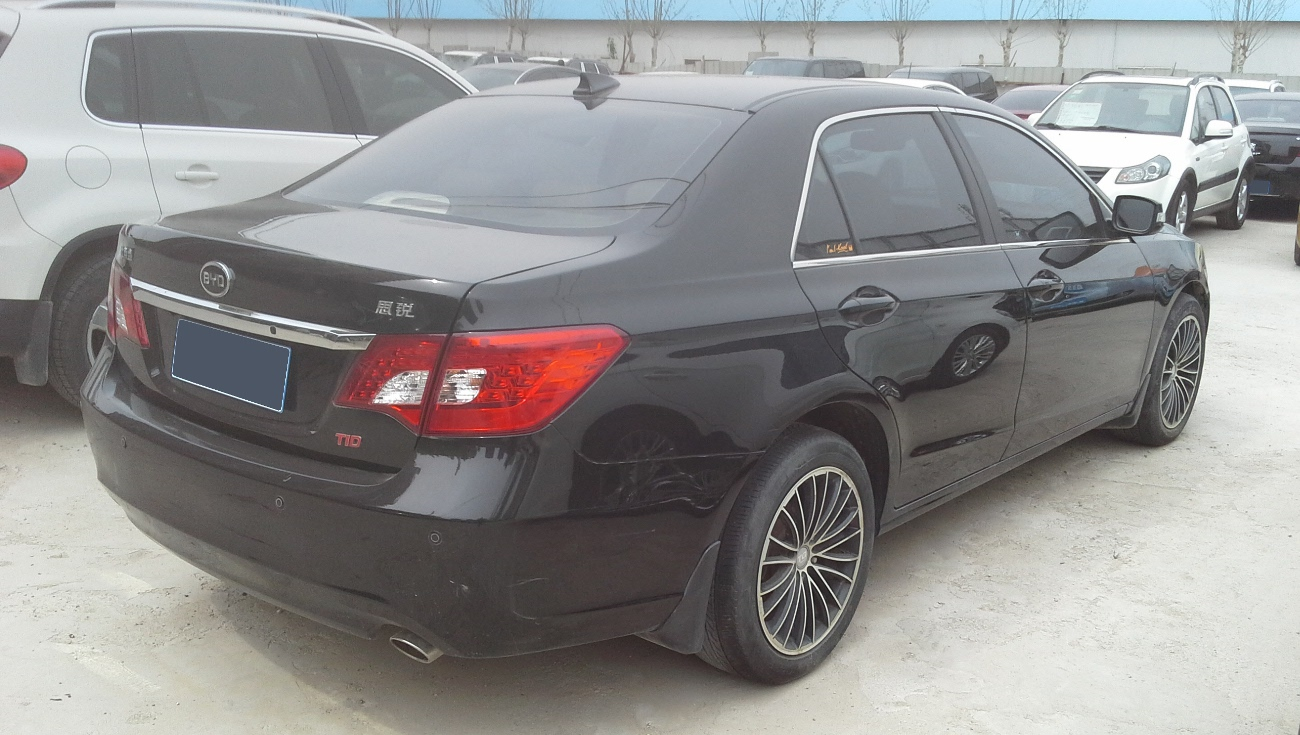
BYD Sirui rear.
