= BYD F6 =

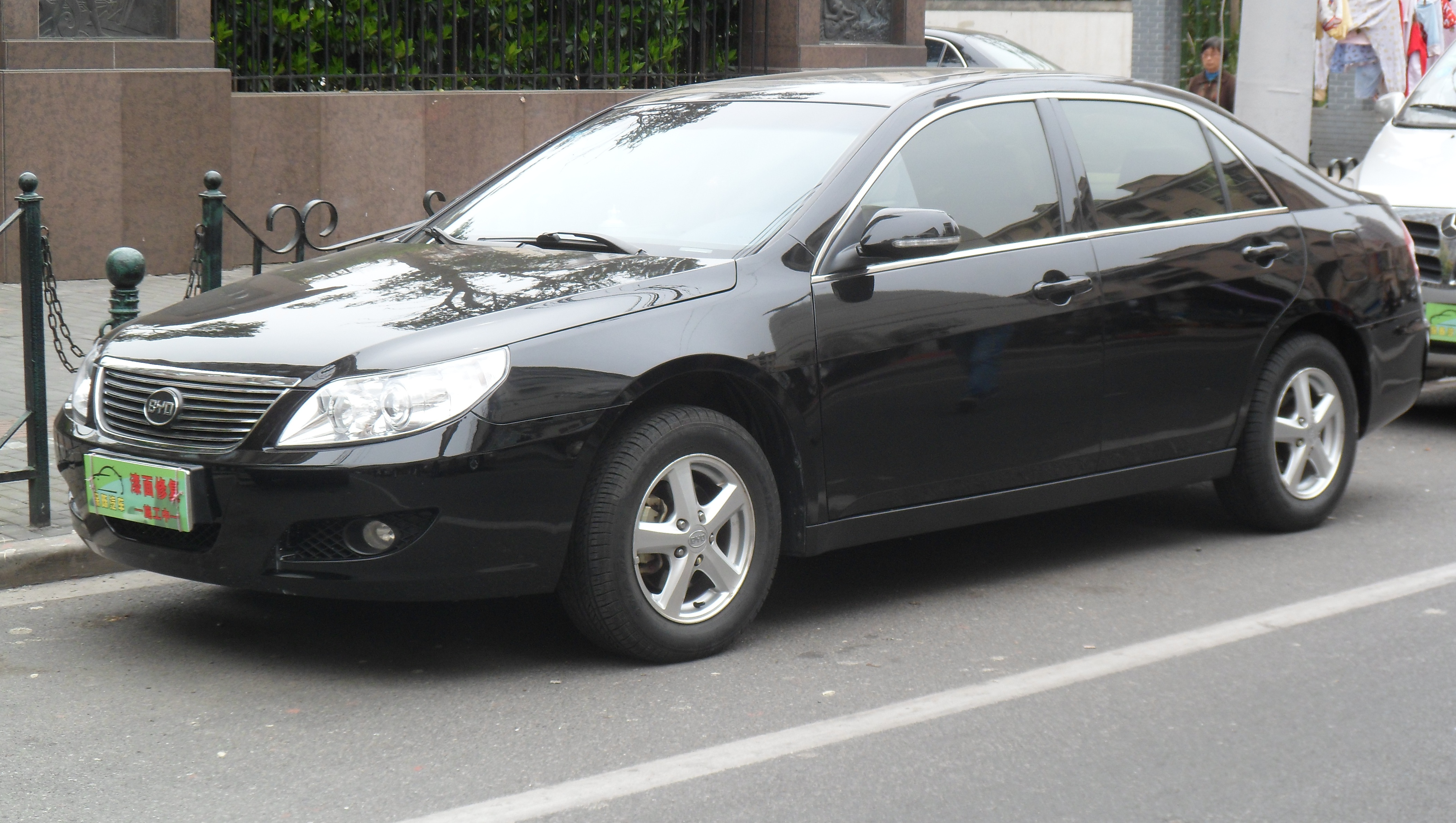

Overview
- Manufacturer: BYD
- Production: 2008–2012

Body and chassis
- Class: Midsize
- Body style: Sedan
- Layout: Front engine, front-wheel-drive

Powertrain
- Engine: 1.0 L BYD371QA I3 (PHEV); 1.8 L BYD483QA I4; 2.0 L BYD483QB I4; 2.4 L 4G69 I4
- Electric motor: 2 permanent-magnet Synchronous Electric Motors, 50kW traction motor + 20kW power generator
- Transmission: 5-speed manual 4-speed automatic CVT
- Hybrid drivetrain: PHEV
- Battery: 19.8 kWh LiFePO4

Dimensions
- Wheelbase: 2,740 mm (107.9 in)
- Length: 4,846 mm (190.8 in)
- Width: 1,822 mm (71.7 in)
- Height: 1,465 mm (57.7 in)

Chronology
- Successor: BYD G6

The BYD F6 is a midsize sedan produced by the Chinese manufacturer BYD.

== Overview ==
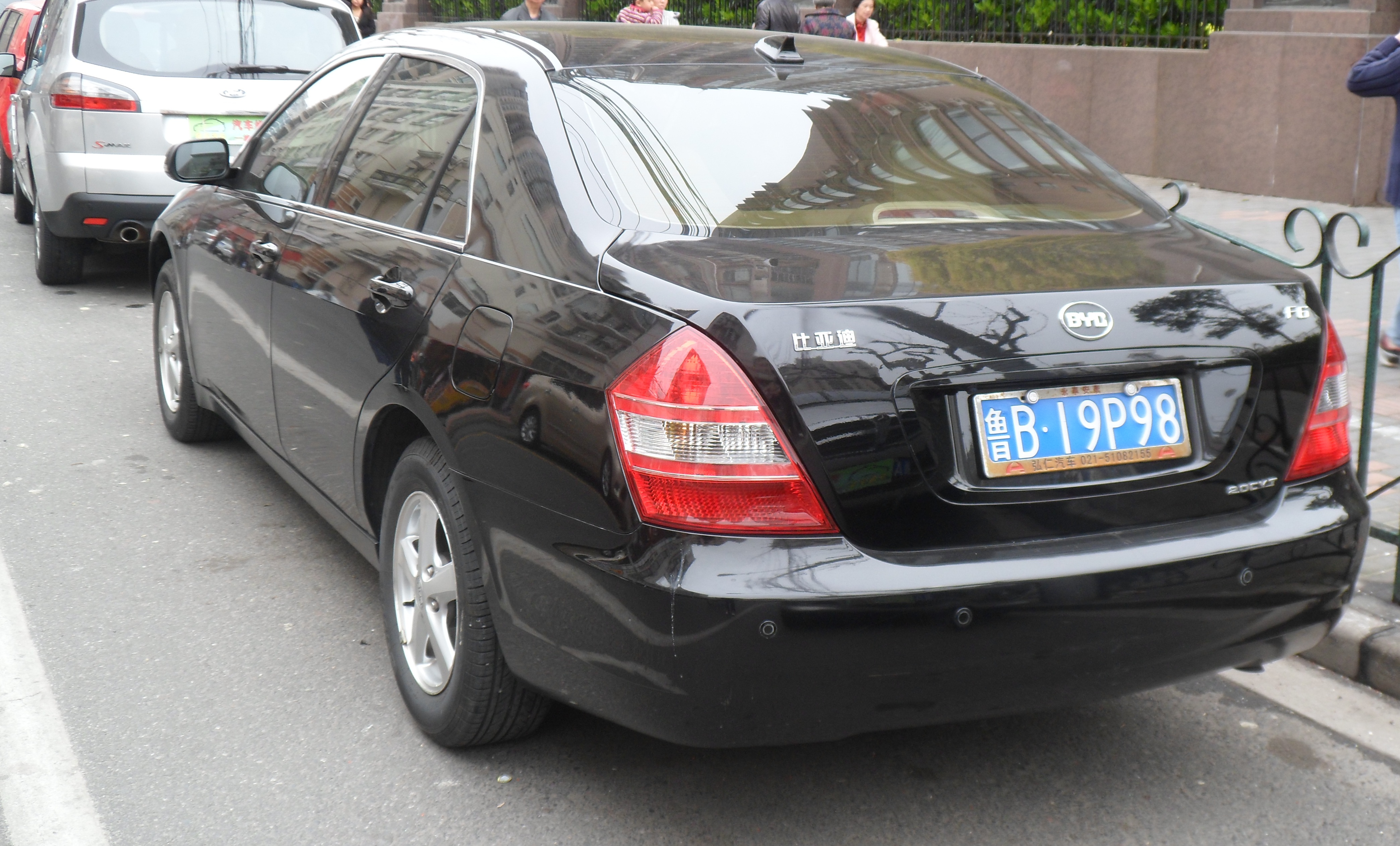
BYD F6 rear

The styling of the BYD F6 heavily resembles the North American seventh-generation Honda Accord with the front of a Renault Latitude and the rear of a Mercedes-Benz S-Class (W221) and has three engines and two transmission options; a 5-speed manual or a 4-speed automatic, with both engines being Mitsubishi designs.

== Plug-in hybrid (F6DM) ==
At the 2008 North American International Auto Show, BYD showcased the F6DM, a plug-in hybrid concept variant of the F6.

The F6DM was introduced at the 2008 North American International Auto Show.

Based on the BYD F6, the F6DM was to use lithium iron phosphate battery, a type of li-ion battery sold under the "Ferrous" trade name, that can be recharged to 70 percent of capacity in 10 minutes. Iron-phosphate lithium-ion batteries are claimed to be much safer than cobalt-oxide lithium-ion batteries, which have a history of causing fires in consumer electronic devices.

BYD claimed that their test model was able to travel 100 kilometres (62 mi) on electric power before the gasoline engine was needed, and that the battery could be fully recharged from an outlet in nine hours.
