= Select Society of Sanitary Sludge Shovelers =

The Select Society of Sanitary Sludge Shovelers (5S) is used by water environment associations (i.e., those working with sewage and sewage treatment) to honour those who have made a particular contribution to the industry.

Pennsylvania started the High Hat Society in 1937 and used the words "Sludge Shovelers Society" in its initiation ceremony. Later, this became known as the Ted Moses Sludge Shovelers Society. The second Chapter of the Five S Society was formed in Arizona in October 1940, the idea being conceived by A.W. "Dusty" Miller and F. Carlyle Roberts Jr. There are chapters in the United States and in Canada, as well as the United Kingdom, Australia and New Zealand.

5S chapters do not accept applications, but select potential members. Each inductee receives a badge in the form of a gold tie bar in the shape of a round-nosed shovel.
