= BYD Song Plus =

Compact crossover SUV

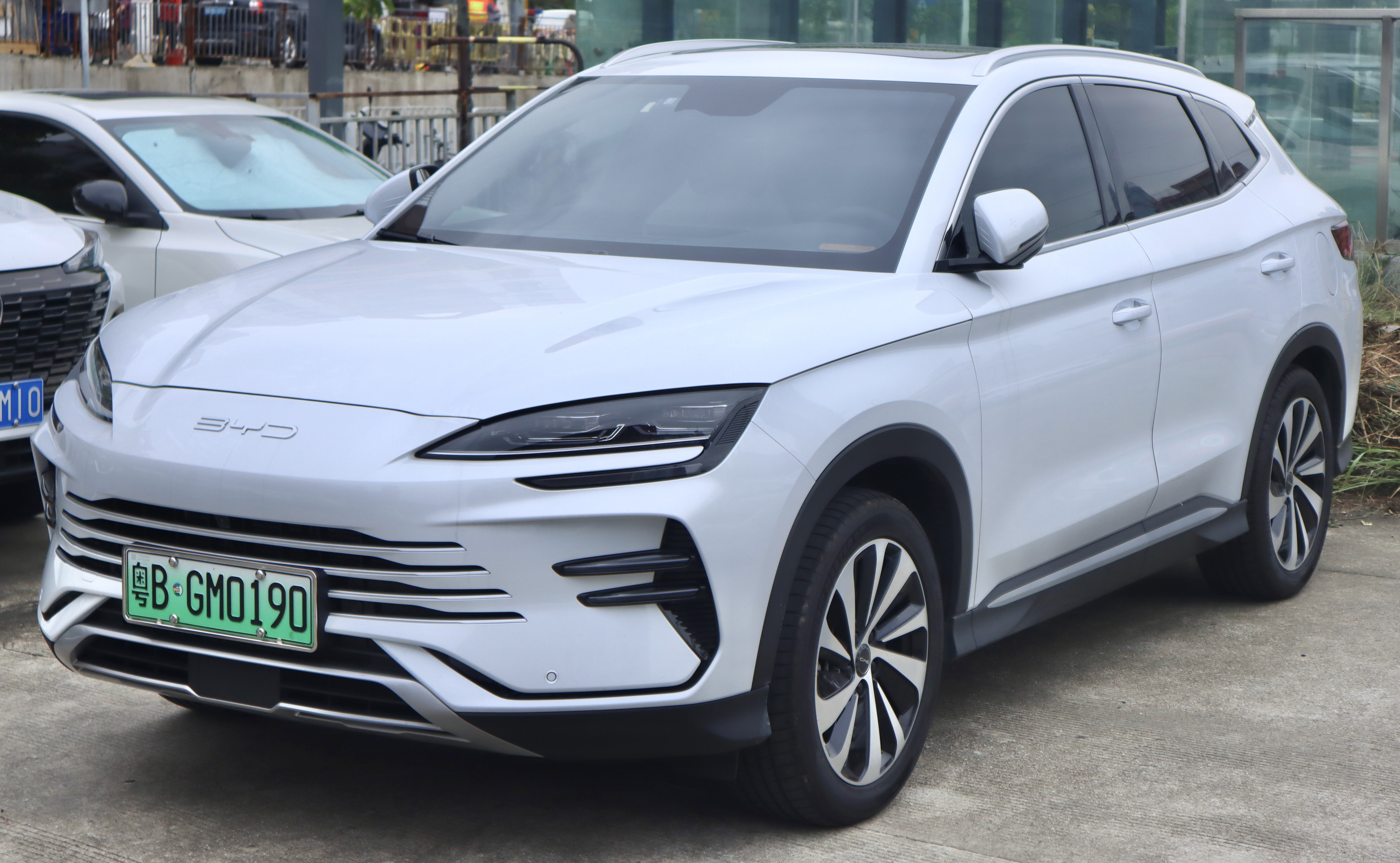
- 2023 BYD Song Plus DM-i

Overview
- Manufacturer: BYD Auto
- Model code: SA3
- Also called: BYD Seal U (Europe); BYD Sealion 6
- Production: September 2020 – 2026 (China); 2023–present (export)
- Assembly: China: Xi'an, Shaanxi; Uzbekistan: Jizzakh (UzAuto Motors, 2024–present); Thailand: Rayong (BYD Auto (Thailand), 2024–present)

Body and chassis
- Class: Compact SUV
- Body style: 5-door crossover SUV
- Layout: Front-engine, front-wheel drive (petrol); Front-engine, front-motor, front-wheel drive (DM-i); Front-engine, dual-motor, all-wheel drive (DM-i AWD); Front-motor, front-wheel drive (EV)
- Chassis: Unibody
- Related: BYD Mako; BYD Song Pro; BYD Song L DM-i

Powertrain
- Engine: Petrol: 1.5 L BYD472ZQA I4 turbo (2020–2021); Petrol plug-in hybrid: 1.5 L BYD476QA I4; 1.5 L BYD476QC I4; 1.5 L BYD476ZQC I4 turbo
- Electric motor: 1 or 2× PMSM Motor (DM-i)
- Transmission: 7-speed DCT (petrol); E-CVT (DM-i)
- Hybrid drivetrain: Plug-in hybrid (DM-i)
- Battery: 8.3 – 26.6 kWh LFP Blade (DM-i); 71.7 – 87.04 kWh LFP Blade (EV)

Dimensions
- Wheelbase: 2,765 mm (108.9 in)
- Length: 4,705–4,785 mm (185.2–188.4 in)
- Width: 1,890 mm (74.4 in)
- Height: 1,680 mm (66.1 in)
- Curb weight: 1,560 kg (3,439 lb) (petrol); 1,700–2,100 kg (3,748–4,630 lb) (DM-i); 2,295–2,425 kg (5,060–5,346 lb) (EV)

Chronology
- Successor: BYD Sealion 06 (China)

The BYD Song Plus (Chinese: 比亚迪宋PLUS) is a compact SUV manufactured by BYD Auto since 2020. It is part of the BYD Song series of SUVs that are named after the Song dynasty. Initially available solely as an internal combustion engine (ICE) vehicle with a 1.5-litre turbocharged petrol engine, in 2021 BYD introduced the plug-in hybrid Song Plus DM-i and the battery electric Song Plus EV. The petrol model was phased out in 2022.

Originally part of the Dynasty Series line-up, the Song Plus has been sold in China through the Ocean Network dealership chain since 2022 to diversify the offerings of the newly established Ocean Series. The Dynasty Series counterpart of the Song Plus, the Song L DM-i, was introduced in 2024.

In 2023, BYD introduced the Song Plus EV as the BYD Seal U in Europe. The plug-in hybrid Seal U DM-i was introduced later in 2024. In mid-2024, the plug-in hybrid model was introduced in Australia, New Zealand, the Philippines and Thailand as the BYD Sealion 6 DM-i.

As of 2024, the Song Plus is the best-selling BYD SUV in China. Global cumulative production of the model (excluding the ICE-powered variant) surpassed 1 million units by July 2024.

The Song Plus was removed from the BYD Auto China website in January 2026. The newer and larger Sealion 06, available in DM-i and EV variants, became its de facto successor. While in export markets, the Song Plus / Seal U / Sealion 6 remain BYD's staple model.

== Pre-facelift (2020–2023) ==
The Song Plus was introduced in September 2020, as a larger and more "upmarket" alternative to the BYD Song Pro, but positioned below the BYD Tang. It occupies the Chinese B-class SUV segment, equivalent to the global D-segment. The vehicle was initially offered only with an internal combustion engine, with the plug-in hybrid (DM-i) and battery electric (EV) variants joining the lineup later in 2021. The petrol model was phased out in early 2022. Initial versions of the Song Plus is equipped with a 12.8-inch rotatable central infotainment screen with the third-generation DiLink system, a karaoke function, and a full LCD instrument panel.

The petrol version, marketed briefly between 2020 and 2021 uses the 1.5-litre BYD472ZQA I4 turbocharged petrol engine and a 7-speed wet dual-clutch transmission producing power output of 136 kW (182 hp; 185 PS).

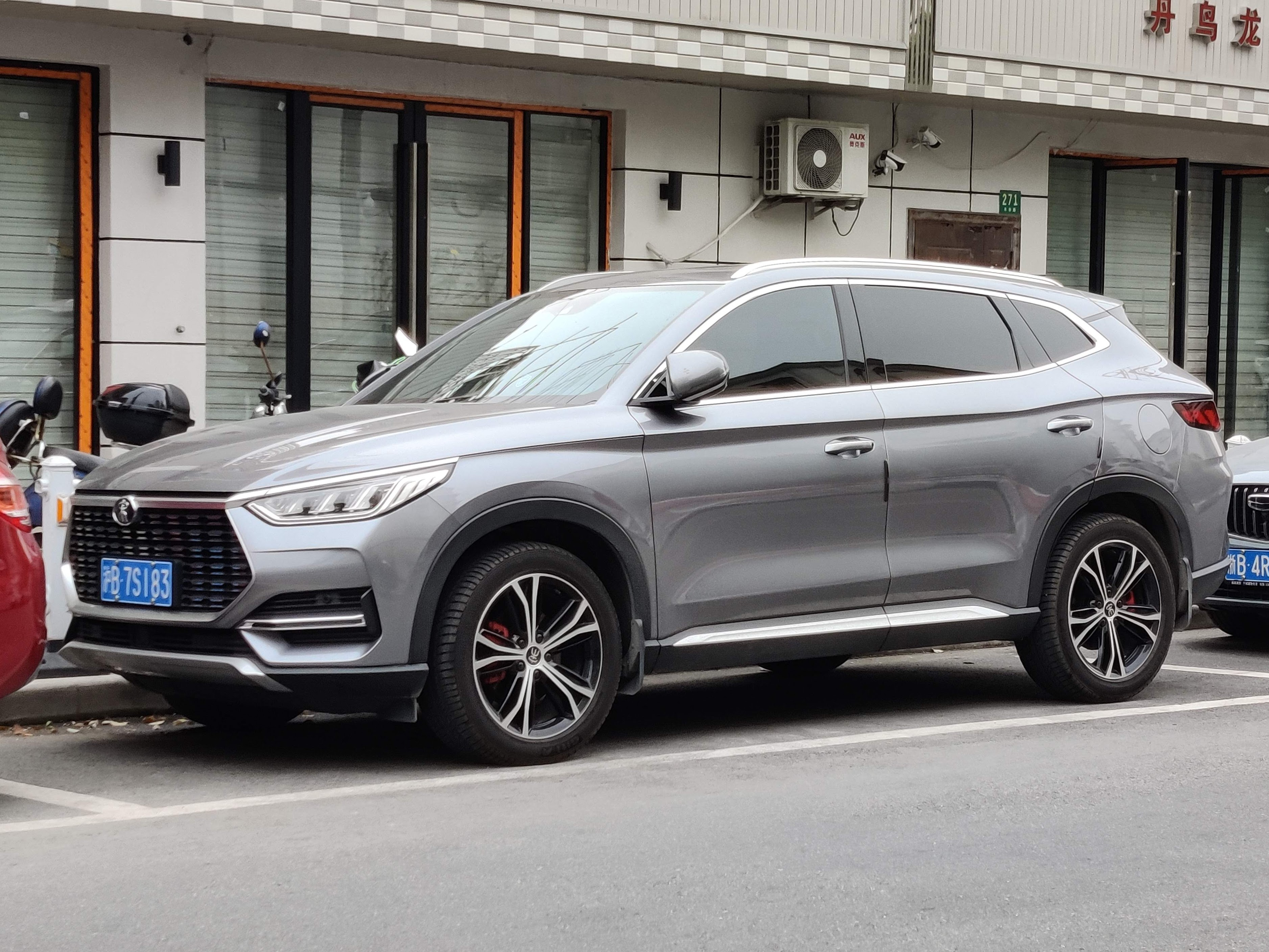
BYD Song Plus (petrol)

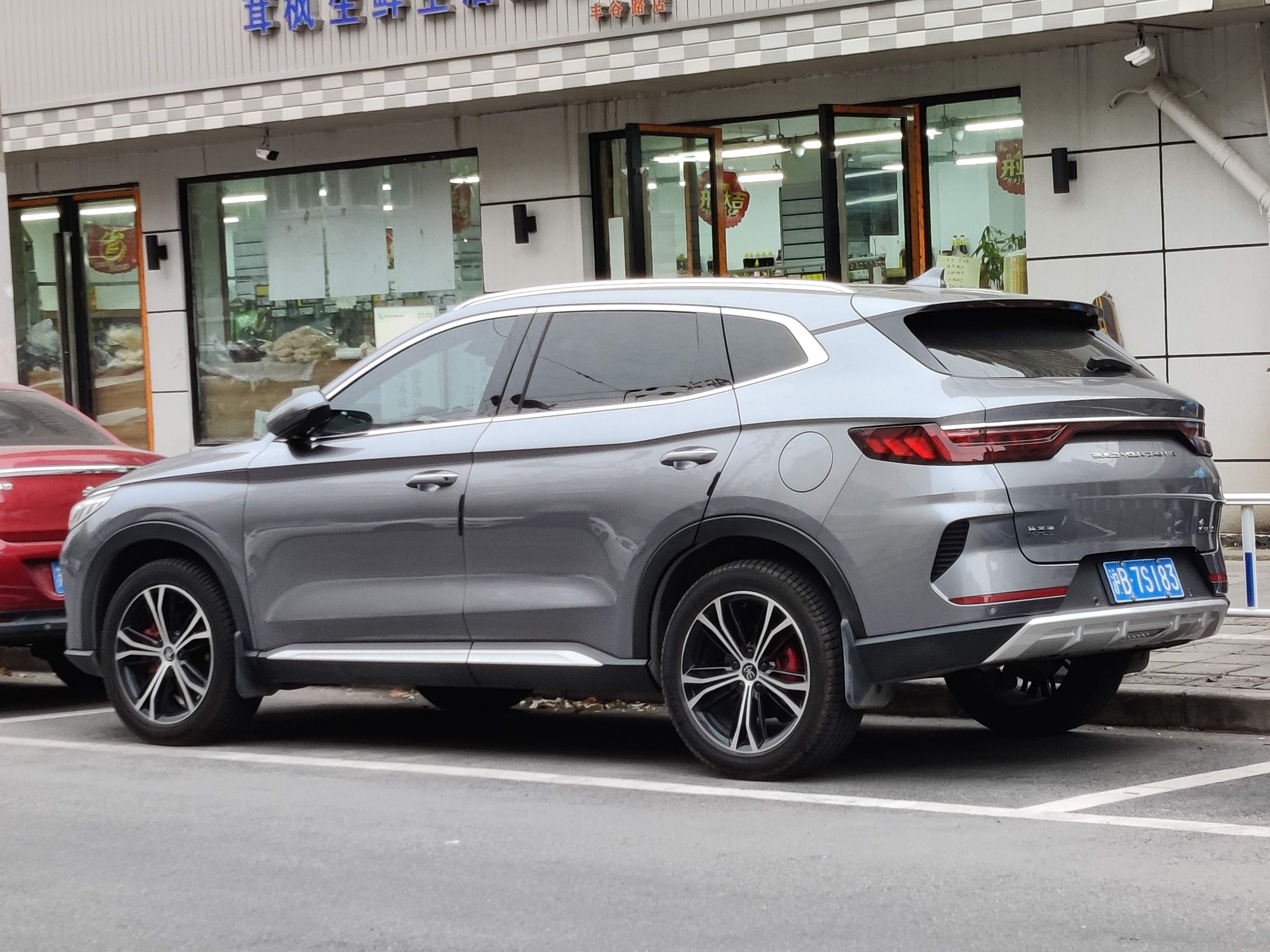
Rear view

=== Song Plus DM-i ===
The plug-in hybrid version of the Song Plus went on sale in March 2021 in China. The model received different front end styling compared to the petrol version and the EV version. For the pre-facelift model, the Song Plus DM-i was available in 51 km and 110 km variants with an NEDC electric range of 51 km (32 mi) and 100 km (62 mi) respectively. This hybrid system provides four major control modes (EV, HEV series, HEV parallel, and engine direct drive).

The claimed fuel consumption of the 51 km variant is rated at 4.4 L/100 km (22.7 km/l; 53.5 mpg_{‑US}), the 0–100 km/h (0–62 mph) acceleration time is 8.5 seconds, and the combined range is 1,150 km (715 mi). For the 110 km variant, the fuel economy is 4.5 L/100 km (22.2 km/l; 52.3 mpg_{‑US}), and the 0–100 km/h (0–62 mph) acceleration time is 7.9 seconds, with a combined range of 1,200 km (746 mi).

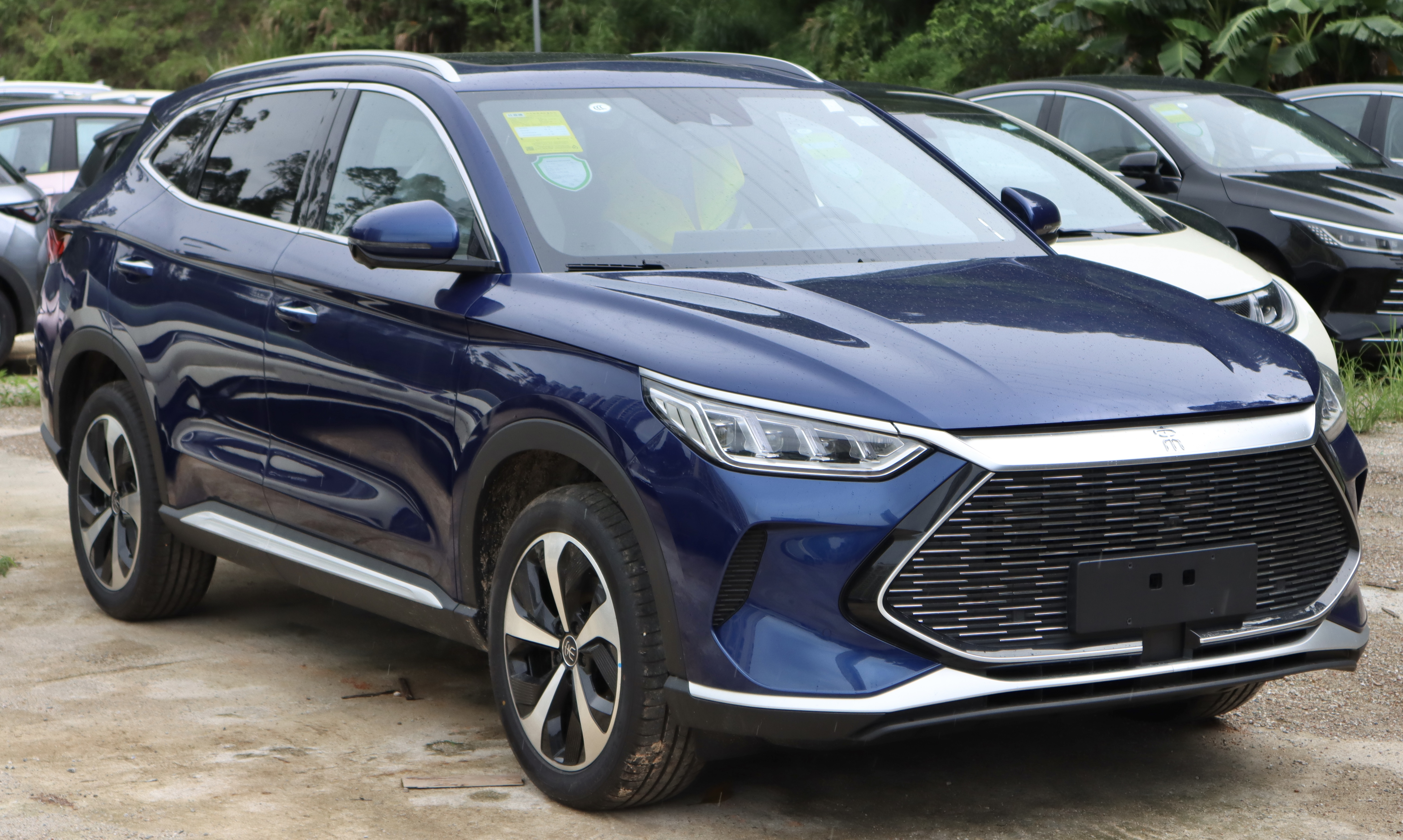
BYD Song Plus DM-i (pre-facelift)

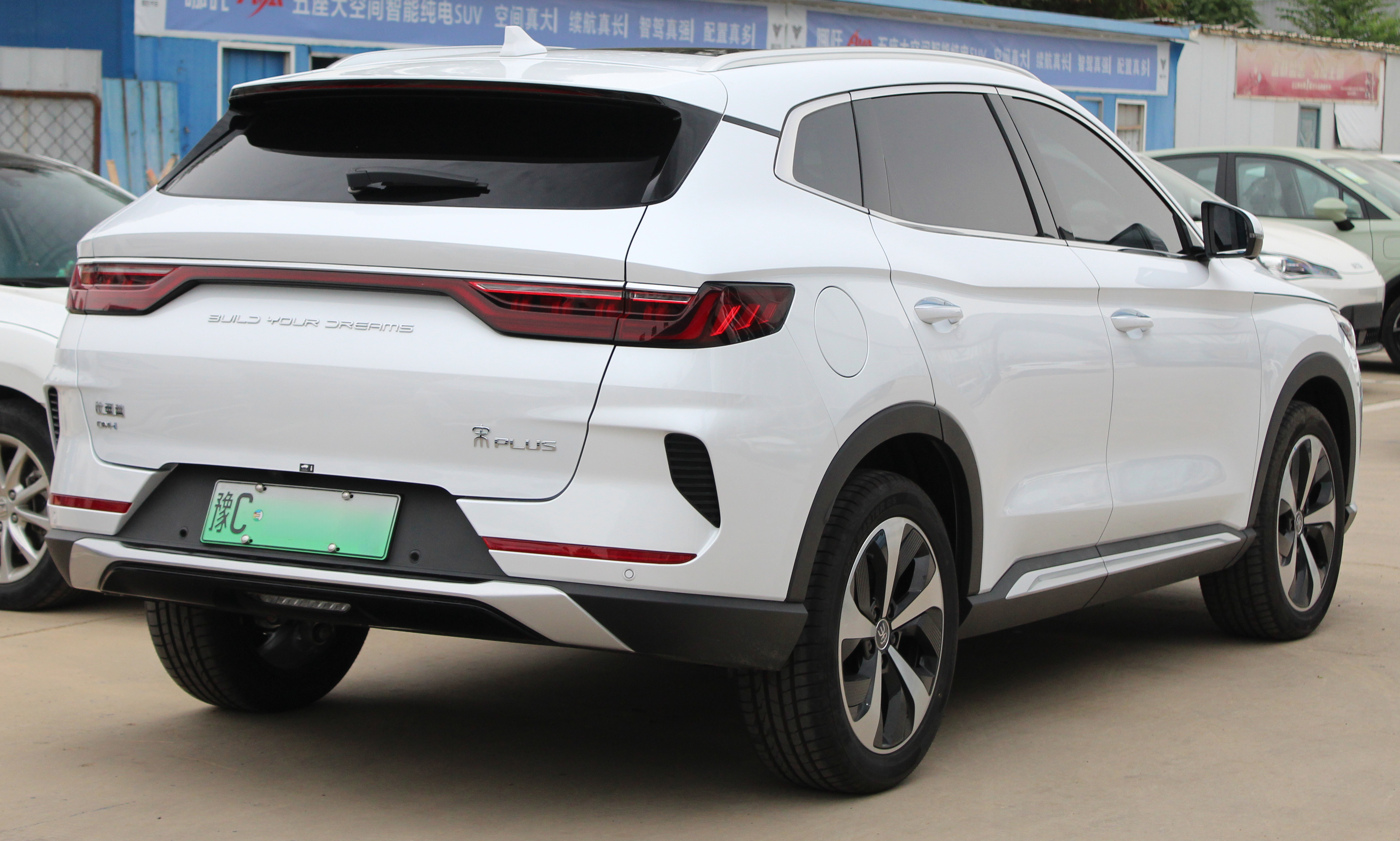
Rear view

=== Song Plus EV ===
The battery electric variant of the Song Plus went on sale in April 2021 in China. The Song Plus EV received a different front end design with smaller grille opening. It is equipped with a 71.7 kWh LFP blade battery. In China, the Song Plus EV was marketed through the e-Network dealerships, which was renamed to the Ocean Network later.

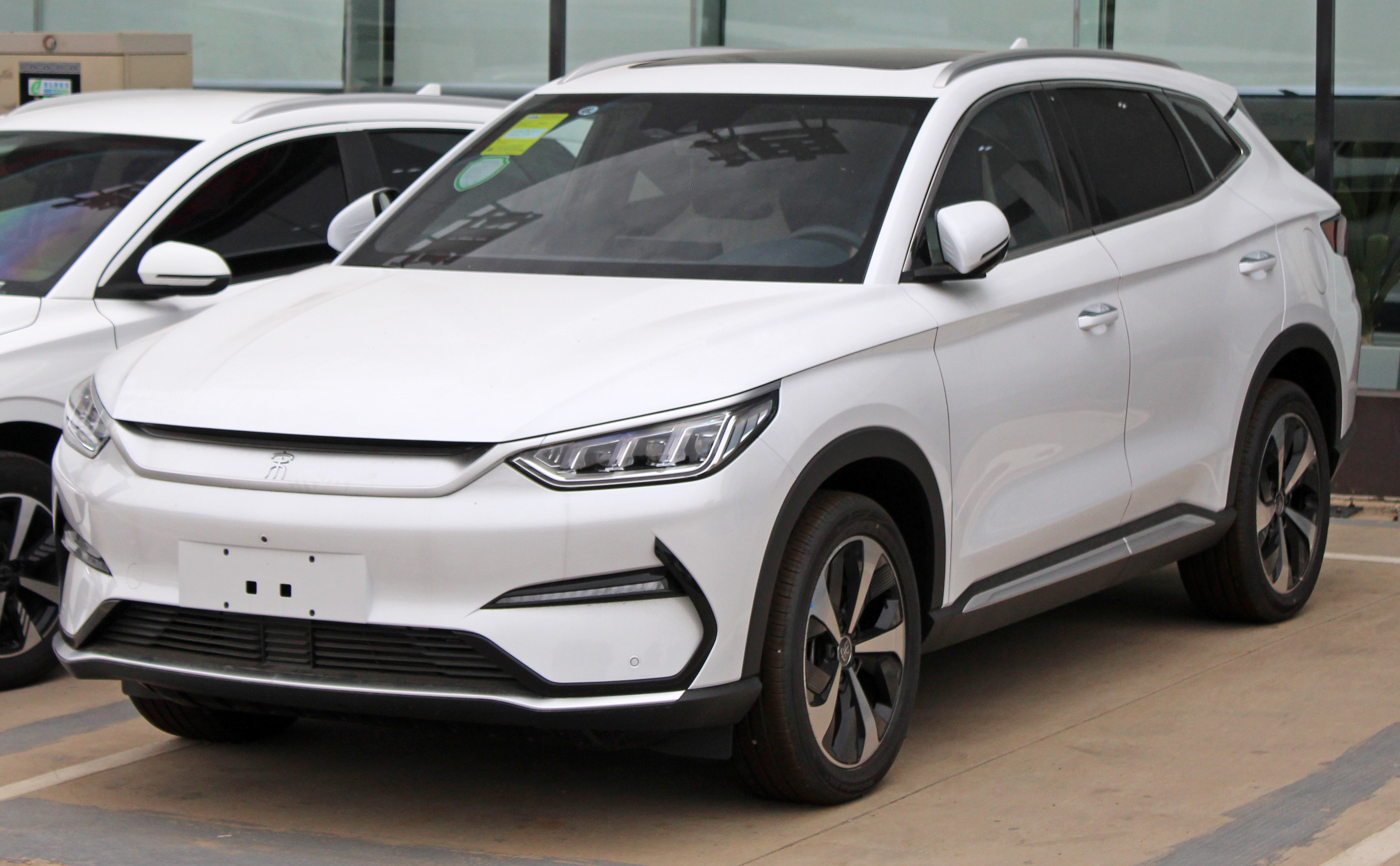
BYD Song Plus EV (pre-facelift)

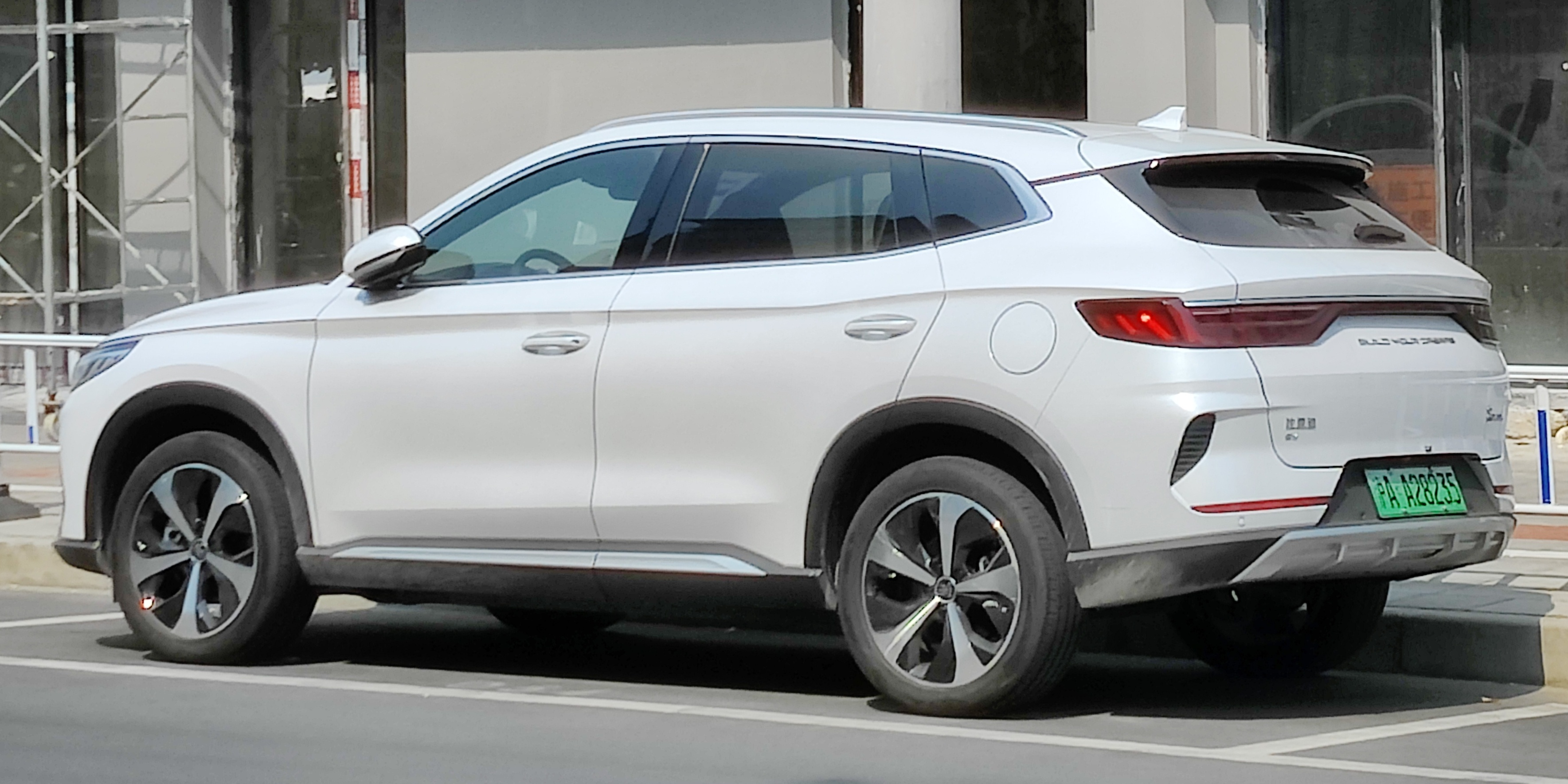
Rear view

== 2023 facelift ==
The updated Song Plus was launched in June 2023 for the Chinese market, initially as the Song Plus Champion Edition. It is available in DM-i and EV variants. It features a restyled front end and rear end design with headlamp units similar to the BYD Seal. BYD also replaced the Song (宋) emblem with the standard BYD logo, aligning it with the vehicles from the Ocean series.

The EV version has a range of 605 km (376 mi) and a power output of 218 hp (163 kW; 221 PS). The DM-i PHEV, features a 1.5-litre engine producing 110 hp (82 kW; 110 PS) and an electric motor producing 197 hp (147 kW; 200 PS).

In 2023, BYD unveiled the BYD Seal U, the export version of the Song Plus EV Champion Edition. It debuted in Europe in September 2023 as part of the Seal family. In May 2024, the vehicle was introduced in Australia and other markets as the BYD Sealion 6.

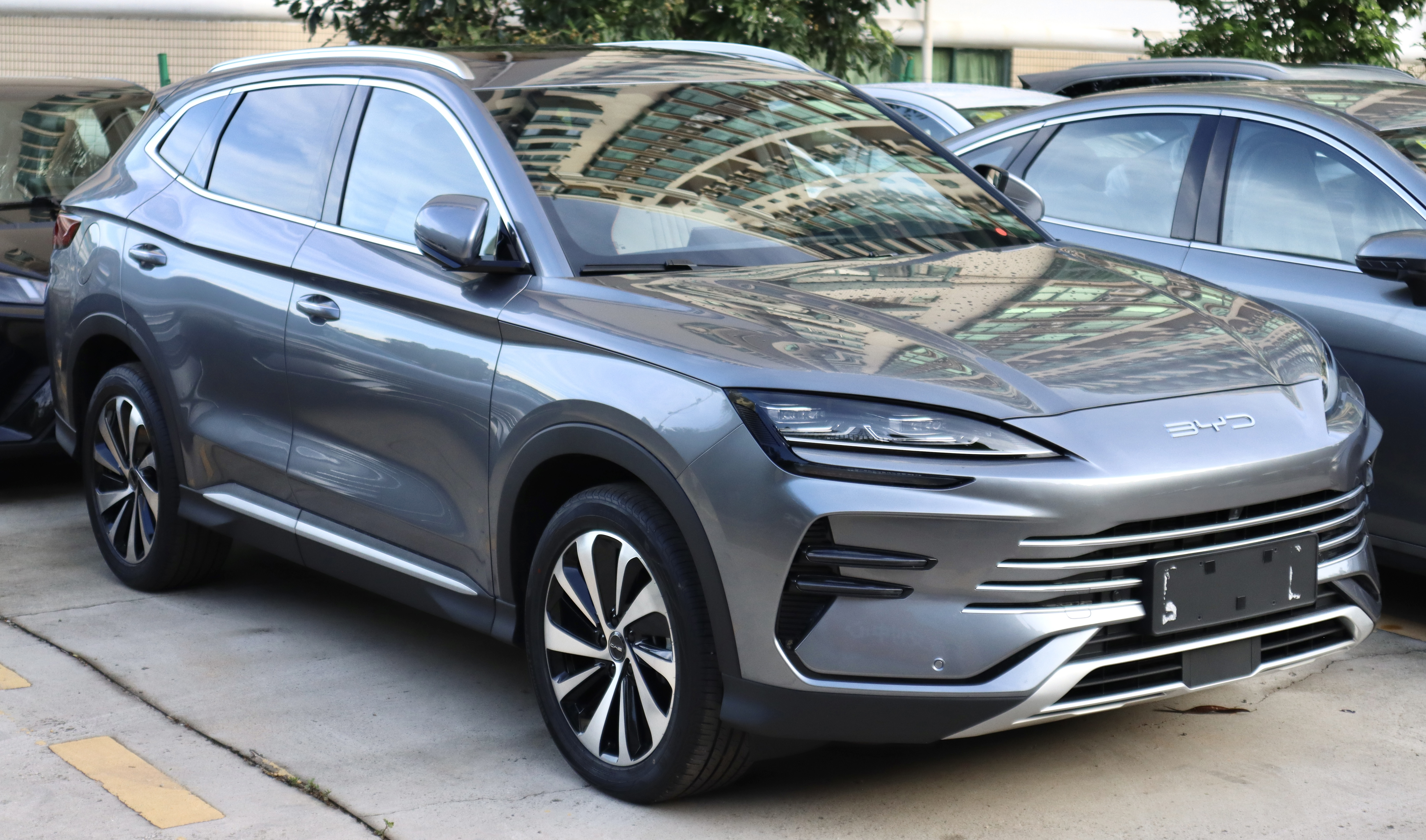
BYD Song Plus DM-i (2023 facelift)

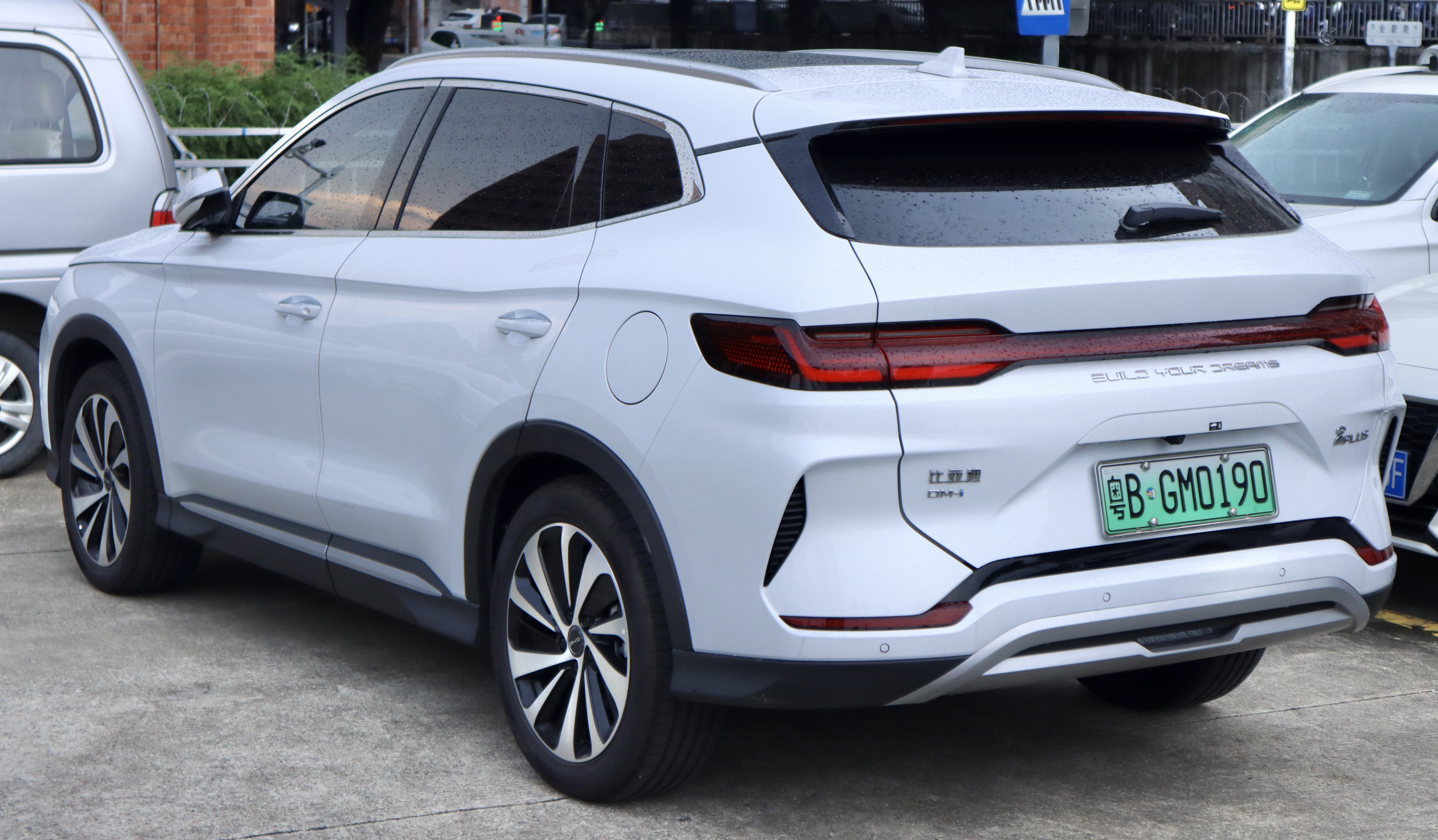
Rear view

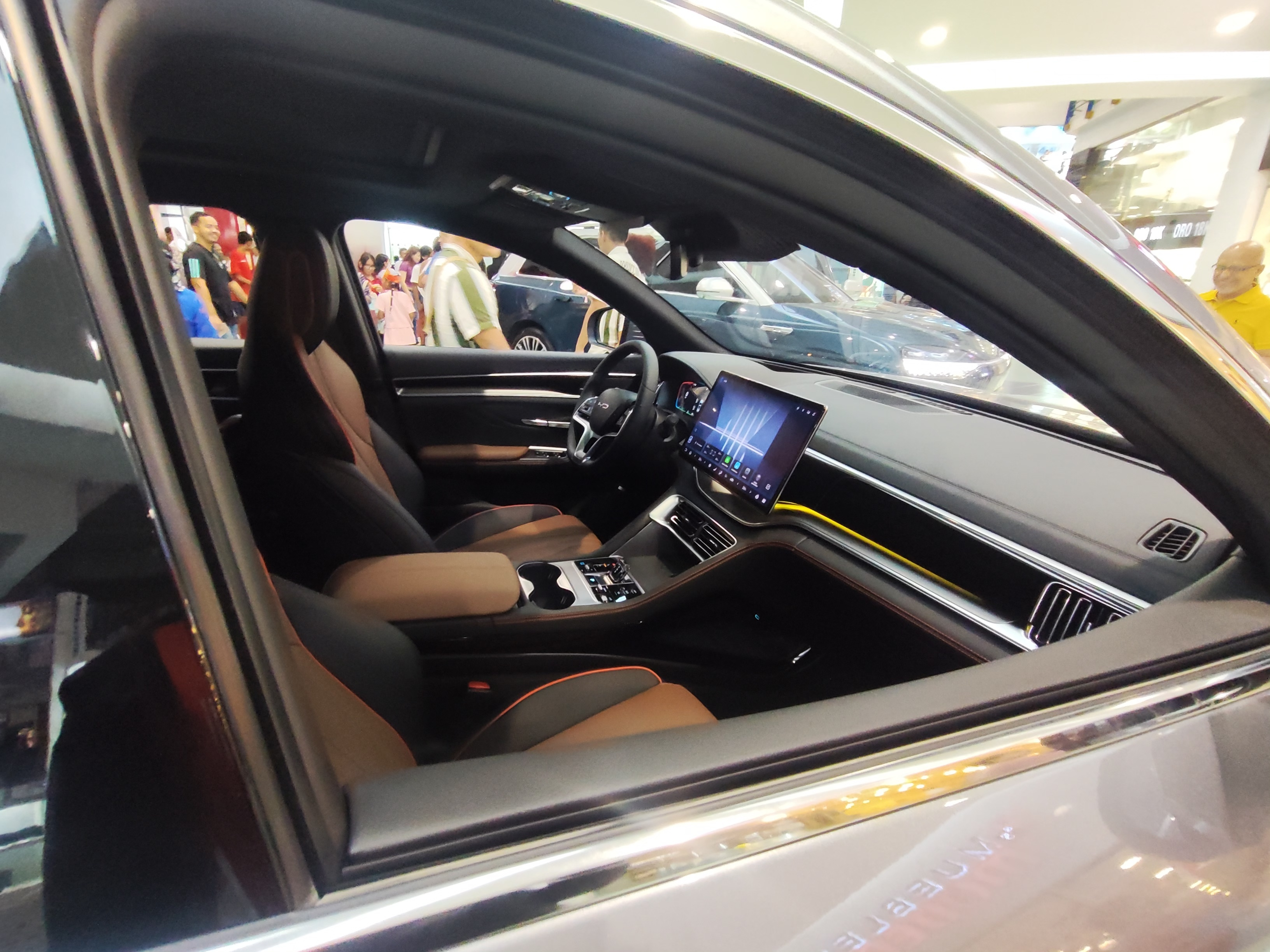
Interior

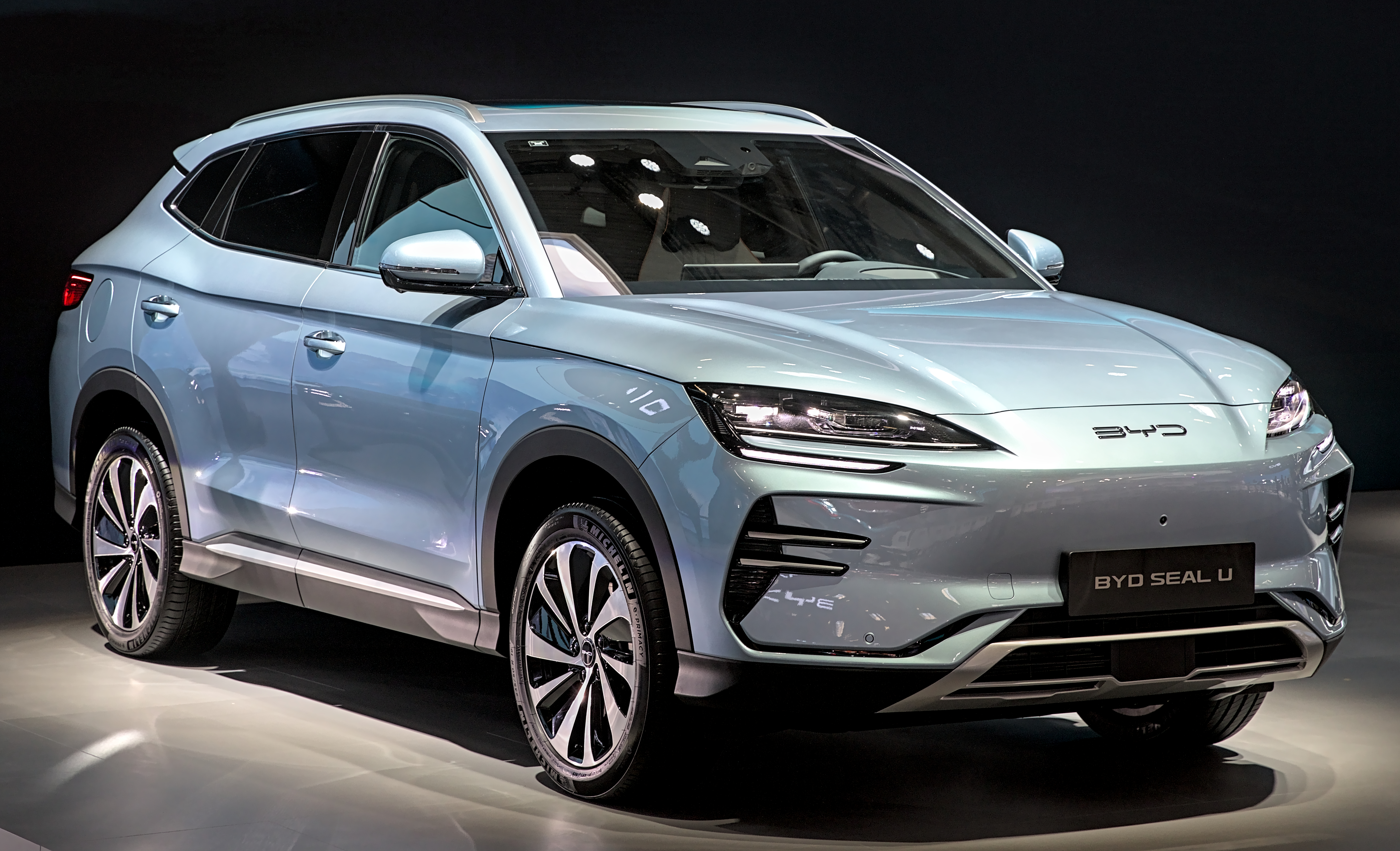
BYD Seal U EV

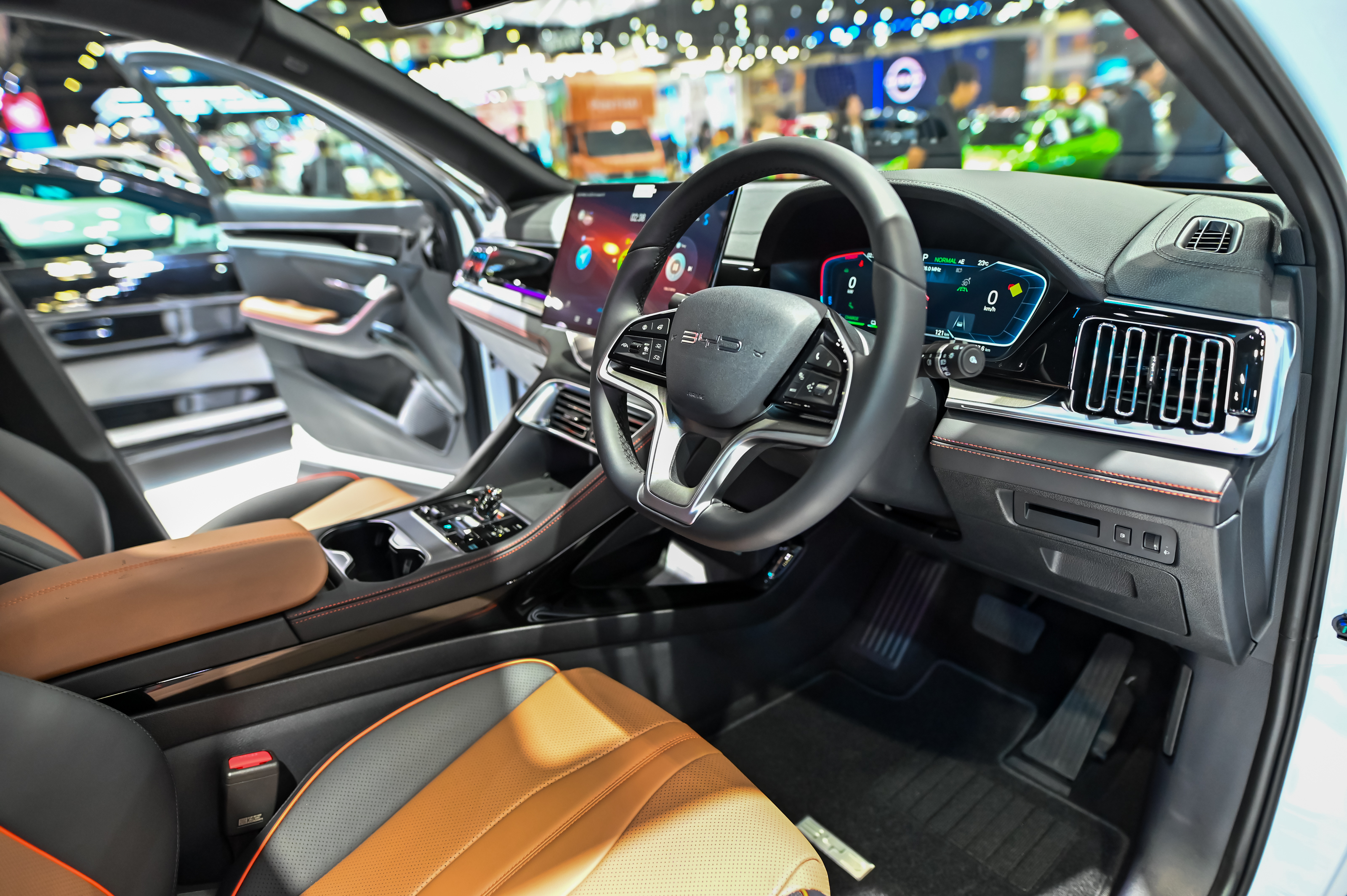
Interior

== Markets ==
=== Asia ===
==== Japan ====
The Sealion 6 DM-i was launched in Japan on 1 December 2025, as the first plug-in hybrid BYD model in the country. It is available in two trim levels: FWD and AWD.

==== Philippines ====
The Sealion 6 DM-i was launched in the Philippines on 25 July 2024, as the first plug-in hybrid BYD model in the country. It is available in a sole variant.

The base Dynamic model was introduced on 12 November 2026, with the Advanced model being renamed into Premium.

==== Singapore ====
The Sealion 6 DM-i was launched in Singapore on 18 July 2025, as the first plug-in hybrid BYD model in the country. It is available in a sole variant.

==== South Korea ====
The Sealion 6 DM-i was launched in South Korea on 26 June 2026, as the first plug-in hybrid BYD model in the country. It is available in a sole variant.

==== Thailand ====
The Sealion 6 DM-i was launched in Thailand on 8 August 2024 as BYD's first plug-in hybrid model in the country. It is available in two trim levels, Dynamic and Premium, both powered by a naturally aspirated 1.5-litre DM-i petrol engine driving the front wheels.

On 27 November 2025, a Sealion 6 became the 70,000th vehicle produced at BYD's plant in Rayong, Thailand.

On 21 August 2026, an Extended variant was added to the range, featuring an upgraded 26.6 kWh LFP Blade Battery, 55 kW DC charging, and an extended electric-only range of up to 150 km (93 mi).

==== Vietnam ====
The Sealion 6 DM-i was launched in Vietnam on 18 April 2025, as the first plug-in hybrid BYD model in the country, alongside the Sealion 8. It is available in two trim levels: Dynamic and Premium, both powered by a 1.5-litre DM-i naturally aspirated petrol engine and front-wheel drive.

=== Australia and New Zealand ===
The vehicle went on sale Australia and New Zealand as the Sealion 6 in May 2024 as the first plug-in hybrid BYD model in the country. The model was on sale after a last-minute change from the proposed name Seal U. Two variants are available, named Dynamic and Premium, both are plug-in hybrid DM-i models. The Premium trim is powered by a more powerful 1.5-litre DM-i turbocharged petrol engine and equipped with dual-motor all-wheel drive. The entry-level Essential variant was introduced in January 2025. The base Dynamic model was discontinued after its price was reduced in January 2025. For the 2025 model year, BYD listed only the feature-reduced Essential and the unchanged Premium variants in its lineup. The Dynamic model was reintroduced in August 2025 with Standard Range (18.3 kWh) and Extended Range (26.6 kWh) variants. The Premium model was made available with Extended Range (26.6 kWh) variant in September 2025.

=== Europe ===
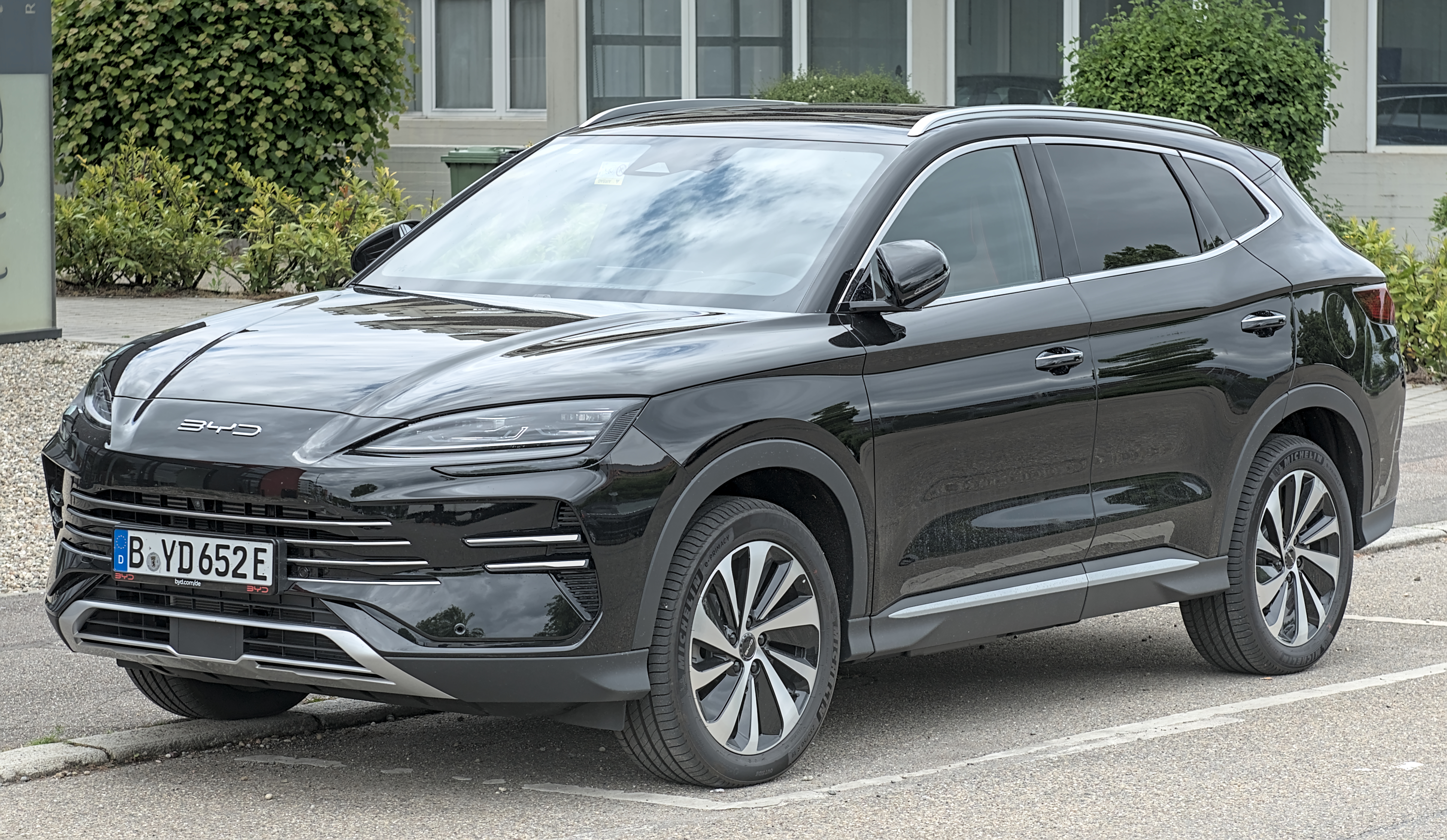
BYD Seal U DM-i

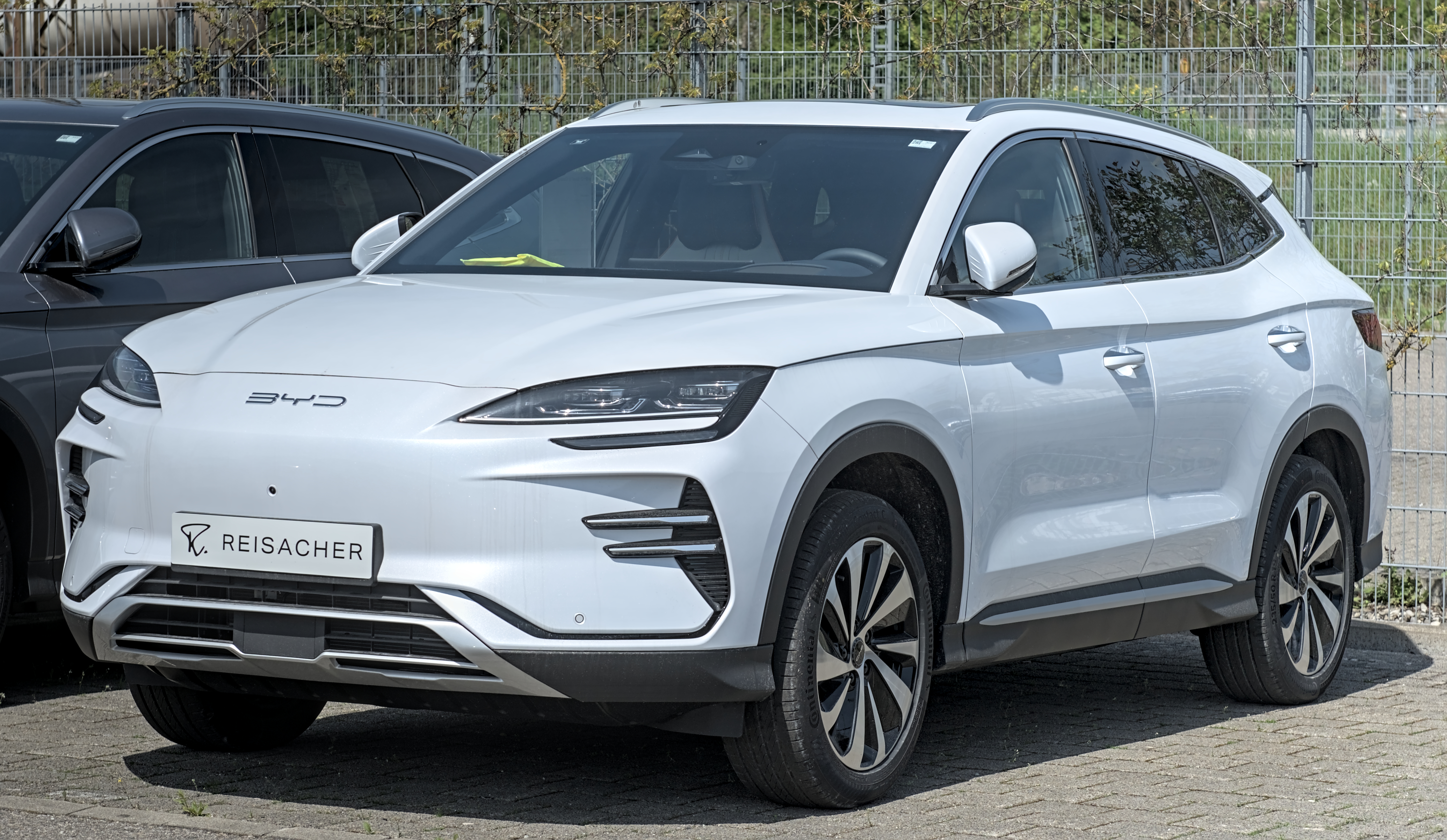
BYD Seal U EV

The Song Plus is sold as the BYD Seal U in Europe, aligning its name with the Seal sedan with an additional "U" moniker representing "utility". The EV model went on sale in February 2024, after its initial introduction in September 2023. Two variants are available, which are Comfort, which offers a 71.8 kWh battery, and the Design, which is specified with an 87 kWh battery. The battery electric Seal U is not available in right-hand drive markets such as the UK and Ireland.

The plug-in hybrid model was introduced in May 2024 as the Seal U DM-i as the first plug-in hybrid BYD model in the region. It went on sale in some European countries, including right-hand drive markets such as the UK, since June 2024.

=== Latin America ===
==== Argentina ====
The Seal U DM-i was launched in Argentina on 30 June 2026, in the sole unnamed variant powered by a 1.5-litre DM-i turbocharged petrol engine and equipped with dual-motor all-wheel drive.

==== Brazil ====
The Song Plus DM-i went on sale in Brazil in November 2022 as the third product of BYD in the market, after the Han and Tan EVs. It was available in one variant. In June 2024, BYD introduced the 2025 model year Song Plus. While it retains the pre-facelift styling, the vehicle received a larger 18.3 kWh battery replacing the previous 8.3 kWh battery.

In November 2024, the Song Plus Premium went on sale in Brazil. Adopting the 2023 facelift styling, it is an all-wheel drive plug-in hybrid with a 1.5-litre turbocharged petrol engine and a combined output of 238 kW (319 hp; 324 PS). It is sold alongside the previous Song Plus.

==== Mexico ====
The Song Plus DM-i went on sale in Mexico in December 2023 as the first plug-in hybrid BYD model in the country. It is available in a single variant, with a 1.5-litre turbocharged petrol engine and equipped with dual-motor all-wheel drive. During its introduction, it was the least expensive plug-in hybrid vehicle sold in the country.

=== South Africa ===
The Sealion 6 DM-i was launched in South Africa on 4 April 2025, alongside the Sealion 7 and Shark 6. It is available in three trim levels: Comfort, Dynamic and Premium. The Comfort and Dynamic trims use the 1.5-litre DM-i naturally aspirated petrol engine with the front-wheel drive configuration, while the Premium trim use the 1.5-litre DM-i turbocharged petrol engine with the dual-motor all-wheel drive configuration. At the time of its introduction, the Sealion 6 DM-i was the cheapest plug-in hybrid vehicle (PHEV) on sale in South Africa.

== Powertrain ==
=== Song Plus (petrol) ===
Type	Engine code	Displ.	Power	Torque	Transmission	Layout	Calendar years
1.5T	BYD476ZQD	1,497 cc (1.5 L) I4 turbo	136 kW (182 hp) @ 5,500 rpm	288 N⋅m (29.4 kg⋅m; 212 lb⋅ft) @ 1,500–3,700 rpm	7-speed DCT	FWD	2020–2021

=== Song Plus DM-i ===
Type	Engine			Battery	Layout	Electric motor			Combined system	0–100 km/h (62 mph)	Electric range		Calendar years
Type	Displ.	Power	Torque	Battery	Layout	Type	Power	Torque	Power	0–100 km/h (62 mph)	NEDC	WLTC	Calendar years
DM-i 51	BYD476QA 1,498 cc (1.5 L) I4	81 kW (109 hp)	135 N⋅m (13.8 kg⋅m; 99.6 lb⋅ft)	8.3 kWh LFP Blade	FWD	Front PMSM	132 kW (177 hp)	316 N⋅m (32.2 kg⋅m; 233 lb⋅ft)	N/A	8.5 seconds	51 km (32 mi)	43 km (27 mi)	2021–2023
DM-i 110	BYD476QA 1,498 cc (1.5 L) I4	81 kW (109 hp)	135 N⋅m (13.8 kg⋅m; 99.6 lb⋅ft)	18.3 kWh LFP Blade	FWD	Front PMSM	145 kW (194 hp)	325 N⋅m (33.1 kg⋅m; 240 lb⋅ft)	N/A	7.9 seconds	110 km (68 mi)	85 km (53 mi)	2021–2024
DM-i 150	BYD476QA 1,498 cc (1.5 L) I4	81 kW (109 hp)	135 N⋅m (13.8 kg⋅m; 99.6 lb⋅ft)	26.6 kWh LFP Blade	FWD	Front PMSM	145 kW (194 hp)	325 N⋅m (33.1 kg⋅m; 240 lb⋅ft)	N/A	8.5 seconds	150 km (93 mi)	116 km (72 mi)	2023–2024
DM-i 100 4WD	BYD476ZQC 1,497 cc (1.5 L) I4 turbo	102 kW (137 hp)	231 N⋅m (23.6 kg⋅m; 170 lb⋅ft)	18.3 kWh LFP Blade	AWD	Front PMSM	145 kW (194 hp)	316 N⋅m (32.2 kg⋅m; 233 lb⋅ft)	265 kW (355 hp)	5.9 seconds	100 km (62 mi)	N/A	2021–2023
DM-i 100 4WD	BYD476ZQC 1,497 cc (1.5 L) I4 turbo	102 kW (137 hp)	231 N⋅m (23.6 kg⋅m; 170 lb⋅ft)	18.3 kWh LFP Blade	AWD	Rear PMSM	120 kW (161 hp)	280 N⋅m (29 kg⋅m; 210 lb⋅ft)	265 kW (355 hp)	5.9 seconds	100 km (62 mi)	N/A	2021–2023
DM-i 75	BYD476QC 1,498 cc (1.5 L) I4	74 kW (99 hp)	126 N⋅m (12.8 kg⋅m; 92.9 lb⋅ft)	12.9 kWh LFP Blade	FWD	Front PMSM	160 kW (215 hp)	260 N⋅m (26.5 kg⋅m; 192 lb⋅ft)	N/A	7.7 seconds	75 km (47 mi)	60 km (37 mi)	2024–present
DM-i 112	BYD476QC 1,498 cc (1.5 L) I4	74 kW (99 hp)	126 N⋅m (12.8 kg⋅m; 92.9 lb⋅ft)	18.3 kWh LFP Blade	FWD	Front PMSM	160 kW (215 hp)	260 N⋅m (26.5 kg⋅m; 192 lb⋅ft)	N/A	7.7 seconds	112 km (70 mi)	91 km (57 mi)	2024–present
DM-i 160	BYD476QC 1,498 cc (1.5 L) I4	74 kW (99 hp)	126 N⋅m (12.8 kg⋅m; 92.9 lb⋅ft)	26.6 kWh LFP Blade	FWD	Front PMSM	160 kW (215 hp)	260 N⋅m (26.5 kg⋅m; 192 lb⋅ft)	N/A	7.9 seconds	160 km (99 mi)	128 km (80 mi)	2024–present

=== Sealion 6 DM-i / Seal U DM-i ===
Type	Engine			Battery		Layout	Electric motor			Combined system	0–100 km/h (62 mph)	Electric range	Calendar years
Type	Displ.	Power	Torque	Type	Weight	Layout	Type	Power	Torque	Power	0–100 km/h (62 mph)	NEDC	Calendar years
DM-i	BYD476QA 1,498 cc (1.5 L) I4	81 kW (109 hp)	122 N⋅m (12.4 kg⋅m; 90.0 lb⋅ft)	18.3 kWh LFP Blade	175–181 kg (386–399 lb)	FWD	Front PMSM TZ220XYE	145 kW (194 hp)	300 N⋅m (30.6 kg⋅m; 221 lb⋅ft)	160 kW (215 hp)	8.5 seconds	92 km (57 mi)	2024–present
DM-i Extended Range	BYD476QA 1,498 cc (1.5 L) I4	81 kW (109 hp)	122 N⋅m (12.4 kg⋅m; 90.0 lb⋅ft)	26.6 kWh LFP Blade	220–227 kg (485–500 lb)	FWD	Front PMSM TZ220XYE	145 kW (194 hp)	300 N⋅m (30.6 kg⋅m; 221 lb⋅ft)	160 kW (215 hp)	8.5 seconds	140 km (87 mi)	2025–present
DM-i AWD	BYD476ZQC 1,497 cc (1.5 L) I4 turbo	102 kW (137 hp)	220 N⋅m (22.4 kg⋅m; 162 lb⋅ft)	18.3 kWh LFP Blade	175–181 kg (386–399 lb)	AWD	Front PMSM TZ220XYS, Rear PMSM	150 kW (201 hp) front, 120 kW (161 hp) rear	300 N⋅m (30.6 kg⋅m; 221 lb⋅ft) front, 250 N⋅m (25.5 kg⋅m; 184 lb⋅ft) rear	238 kW (319 hp)	5.9 seconds	81 km (50 mi)	2024–present
DM-i AWD Extended Range	BYD476ZQC 1,497 cc (1.5 L) I4 turbo	102 kW (137 hp)	220 N⋅m (22.4 kg⋅m; 162 lb⋅ft)	26.6 kWh LFP Blade	220–227 kg (485–500 lb)	AWD	Front PMSM TZ220XYS, Rear PMSM	150 kW (201 hp) front, 120 kW (161 hp) rear	300 N⋅m (30.6 kg⋅m; 221 lb⋅ft) front, 250 N⋅m (25.5 kg⋅m; 184 lb⋅ft) rear	253 kW (339 hp)	5.5 seconds	128 km (80 mi)	2024–present

=== Song Plus EV / Seal U EV ===
Type	Battery		Layout	Electric motor		Power	Torque	0–100 km/h (0–62 mph) (claimed)	Range (claimed)		Calendar years
Type	Type	Weight	Layout	Electric motor		Power	Torque	0–100 km/h (0–62 mph) (claimed)	CLTC	WLTP	Calendar years
EV	71.7 kWh LFP Blade battery	512 kg (1,129 lb)	FWD	Front	PMSM	135 kW (181 hp)	280 N⋅m (28.6 kg⋅m; 207 lb⋅ft)	N/A	520 km (323 mi)	N/A	2021–2023
EV 520	71.8 kWh LFP Blade battery	513 kg (1,131 lb)	FWD	Front	PMSM	150 kW (201 hp)	310 N⋅m (31.6 kg⋅m; 229 lb⋅ft)	9.3 seconds	520 km (323 mi)	420 km (261 mi)	2023–present
EV 605	87.04 kWh LFP Blade battery	580 kg (1,279 lb)	FWD	Front	PMSM	160 kW (215 hp)	330 N⋅m (33.7 kg⋅m; 243 lb⋅ft)	9.6 seconds	605 km (376 mi)	500 km (311 mi)	2023–present

== Safety ==
Euro NCAP test results BYD Seal U electric (LHD) (2023)
Test	Points	%
Overall:	5 /5 stars	
Adult occupant:	36.3	90%
Child occupant:	42.4	86%
Pedestrian:	52.6	83%
Safety assist:	13.9	77%

ANCAP test results BYD SEALION 6 (2023, aligned with Euro NCAP)
Test	Points	%
Overall:	5 /5 stars	
Adult occupant:	35.51	88%
Child occupant:	42.52	86%
Pedestrian:	52.59	83%
Safety assist:	13.64	75%

== Sales and production ==
On 20 July 2024, BYD produced the one millionth Song Plus New Energy (DM-i and EV combined).

Year	China				Brazil	Australia	Turkey	Total production
Year	ICE	DM-i	EV	Total	Song Plus DM-i	Sealion 6 DM-i	Seal U DM-i	Total production
2020	N/A	3,118	3,990	7,108				7,108
2021	N/A	79,508	29,340	108,848				108,848
2022		388,048	66,935	454,983	12			458,047
2023		296,294	93,919	390,213	7,672			427,071
2024		266,189	152,285	418,474	17,910	6,198	4,531	511,962
2025		108,295	91,981	200,276	19,677	9,055		400,920

== See also ==
- List of BYD Auto vehicles
