= BYD Mako =

Plug-in hybrid compact pickup truck

Overview
- Manufacturer: BYD Auto
- Production: 2026–present
- Assembly: China: Zhengzhou, Henan; Brazil: Camaçari, Bahia
- Designer: Under the lead of Wolfgang Egger

Body and chassis
- Class: Compact pickup truck
- Body style: 4-door pickup truck
- Layout: Front-engine, front-wheel-drive
- Chassis: Unibody
- Related: BYD Song Pro

Powertrain
- Engine: Petrol plug-in hybrid: 1.5 L BYD476ZQF turbo I4
- Electric motor: Permanent magnet synchronous
- Power output: 166 kW (223 hp; 226 PS)
- Transmission: DHT / E-CVT
- Hybrid drivetrain: Plug-in hybrid
- Battery: 12.9 kWh BYD Blade LFP
- Range: 1,000–1,092 km (621–679 mi) (WLTP)
- Electric range: 100 km (62 mi) (WLTP)

Dimensions
- Wheelbase: 2,900 mm (114.2 in)
- Length: 4,800 mm (189.0 in)
- Width: 1,900 mm (74.8 in)
- Height: 1,900 mm (74.8 in)
- Curb weight: 1,700–2,100 kg (3,748–4,630 lb)

The BYD Mako is a plug-in hybrid compact pickup truck manufactured by the Chinese auto manufacturing company BYD Auto. The vehicle debuted in Brazil in August 2026 as the second light utility vehicle model made by BYD after the BYD Shark 6.

== History ==
In late August 2026, The BYD Auto introduced its second pickup truck, similarly to the larger Shark, built not for domestic but for global markets and also taking its name from sharks. However, the Mako was not built from scratch and utilized the existing design of the BYD Song Pro, sharing features such as the distinctive front fascia with a large, trapezoidal air intake and the shape of the front doors. A unique feature was the spacious, open cargo area enhanced by T-shaped headlights, as well as availability only with the second row of seats.

The Mako passenger compartment has also been adopted from the Song Pro SUV, gaining a distinctive, low-set set of air vents with an expanded central tunnel and a large, 15.6-inch touchscreen providing control of, among other things, the DiLink 100 multimedia system and the vehicle's main functions. The manufacturer has planned a payload of approximately 750 kg.

== Specifications ==
The Mako was built exclusively for a plug-in combustion-electric drivetrain. It utilizes a naturally aspirated 1.5-liter gasoline engine with 98 hp and 122 Nm of maximum torque. With the addition of an electric motor, the Mako develops a combined power output of 223 hp and 400 Nm of maximum torque, and thanks to its 12.9 kWh battery, it can also run in pure electric mode.

== Markets ==
As a first for BYD Auto, The Mako pickup truck was developed specifically for the Brazilian market, and it was there that the car first went on sale. Sales began in September 2026, initially relying on vehicles imported from Chinese plants, before switching to local production in 2027 at BYD's Brazilian plant in Camaçari.

== See also ==
- List of BYD Auto vehicles
