= BYD Seal 6 =

BYD Seal 6 or BYD Seal 06 can refer to 5 vehicles by BYD Auto:

- BYD Seal 6 DM-i, a plug-in hybrid sedan and station wagon
- BYD Seal 06 EV, a battery electric sedan
- BYD Seal 06 GT, a battery electric hatchback
- BYD Qin L DM-i, a battery electric sedan, marketed as the BYD Seal 6 DM-i in Uzbekistan
- BYD Qin L EV, a battery electric sedan, marketed as the BYD Seal 6 EV in Malaysia, Singapore, and Thailand

== See also ==
- BYD Seal
