= BYD Qin =

Compact sedan

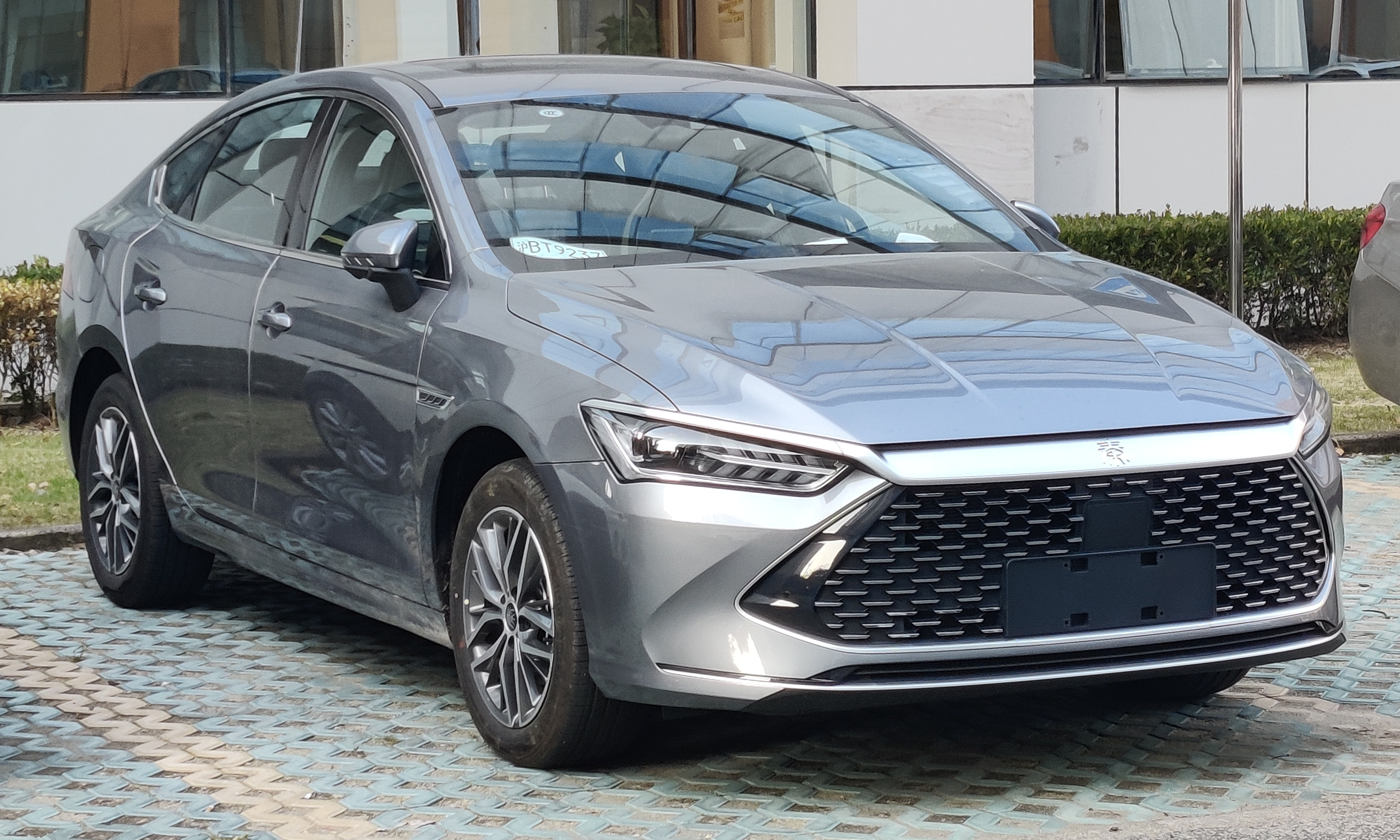
- BYD Qin Plus DM-i

Overview
- Manufacturer: BYD Auto
- Production: 2012–present

Body and chassis
- Class: Compact car / small family car (C-segment); Mid-size car (D-segment)
- Body style: 4-door sedan

Chronology
- Predecessor: BYD F3DM

The BYD Qin (Chinese: 比亚迪秦, after the Qin dynasty) is a series of compact and mid-size sedans produced by BYD Auto since 2012. The Qin started out as the plug-in hybrid version of the BYD Surui, and was introduced in the Chinese market in August 2012. Currently, the Qin is available as a plug-in hybrid (PHEV), battery electric vehicle (BEV), and previously an internal combustion engine (ICE) vehicle.

The Qin is the successor of the BYD F3DM, the world's first mass-produced PHEV automobile which launched in China in 2008. In April 2012, BYD replaced the F3DM with the Qin. The first-generation Qin is the PHEV version of the BYD Surui (the second-generation BYD F3), and deliveries in China began in December 2013.

The second generation model includes two variants was released in September 2018 as the BYD Qin Pro, which was available as an ICE vehicle, PHEV and BEV. In March 2021, this model was updated and renamed to BYD Qin Plus with PHEV and BEV variants. An updated version of the first generation is sold alongside the second generation Qin variants.

In March 2024, BYD released a larger, mid-size Qin variant marketed as the BYD Qin L DM-i, which is solely equipped with the DM-i 5.0 PHEV powertrain. In March 2025, a battery electric counterpart was introduced as the BYD Qin L EV.

A sixth variant of the Qin known as the BYD Qin Max was added to the lineup in August 2026.

== Qin (2012–2024) ==
BYD Qin
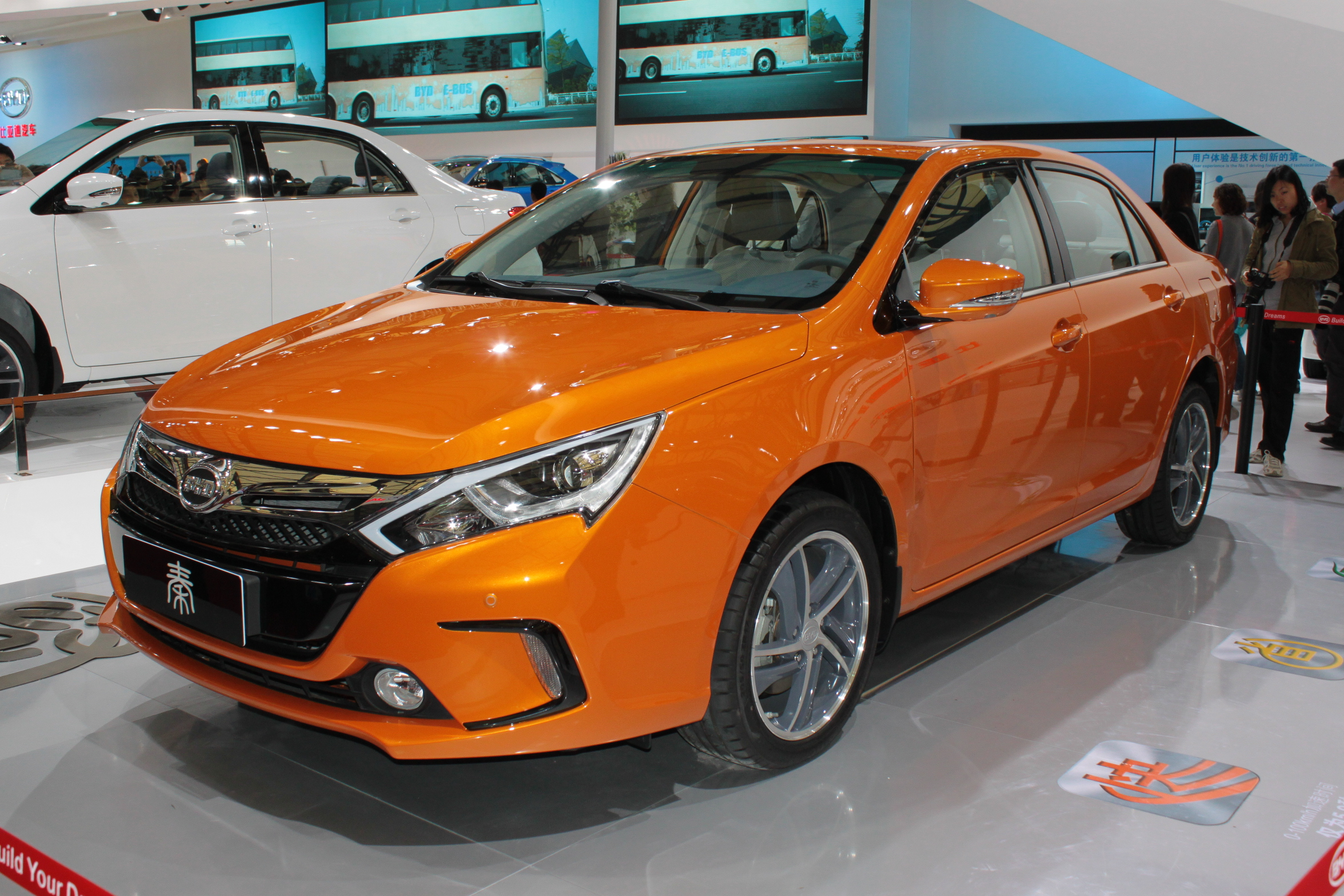

Overview
- Production: 2012–2019 (DM); 2016–2024 (EV); 2019–2022 (petrol)
- Assembly: China: Xi'an, Shaanxi

Body and chassis
- Layout: Front-engine, front-wheel-drive; Front-motor, front-wheel-drive (EV)
- Related: BYD Surui; BYD F3; BYD L3; BYD G3; BYD e5

Powertrain
- Engine: 1.5 L BYD476ZQA I4 (turbo petrol)
- Electric motor: Two 110 kW (148 hp; 150 PS) permanent magnet synchronous motors One 160.3 kW (215 hp; 218 PS) (2016–2024)
- Transmission: 6-speed DCT
- Battery: 13 kWh LFP (DM); 53.1 kWh LFP (2019 Qin)
- Electric range: 70 km (43 mi); 300 km (190 mi) (EV300); 400 km (250 mi) (2019 Qin Travel trim); 421 km (262 mi) (2019 Qin High Endurance trim)

Dimensions
- Wheelbase: 2,670 mm (105.1 in)
- Length: 4,740 mm (186.6 in)
- Width: 1,770 mm (69.7 in)
- Height: 1,480 mm (58.3 in) (2014–2015); 1,490 mm (58.7 in) (2016–2024)

Chronology
- Predecessor: BYD F3DM; BYD e5 (Qin EV)

The BYD Qin concept car was unveiled at the 2012 Beijing International Automotive Exhibition. It was named after the Qin dynasty, China's first imperial dynasty.

The plug-in hybrid variant (which was the only variant available in the beginning) currently offers a NEDC all-electric range of 82 km (51 mi) and a hybrid electric powertrain that can extend the car's total range to a distance similar to that of a conventional petrol-powered vehicle. The all-electric variant offers a NEDC range of 520 kilometres (320 mi).

The Qin was designed with BYD's next-generation, more efficient, dual-mode, electric powertrain. The BYD Qin uses a smaller lithium iron phosphate battery (LiFePO_{4}, or LFP) than its predecessor, the F3DM: 13 kWh instead of 16 kWh. The LiFePO_{4} battery has a high energy density, can withstand up to 4,000 charges and still retain 80 percent performance, and uses no toxic heavy metals in its manufacture. Due to its improved design, the new battery is about 50 percent smaller and lighter than the one used on the F3DM. The reduced battery pack size translates into reduced price at the expense of the all-electric range, which BYD estimates at 50 kilometres (31 mi). The larger battery in the F3DM delivers an all-electric range of 97 kilometres (60 mi). BYD said the Qin would be seven percent more efficient with savings in power and energy in all-electric (EV) mode.

In hybrid mode, the Qin uses two 110-kilowatt (148 hp; 150 PS) electric motors and a 1.5-litre turbo-charged direct-injected engine, instead of the 1.0-litre 3-cylinder engine used in the F3DM, to output 223 kW (299 hp; 303 PS) of power and 440 N⋅m (325 lb⋅ft; 45 kg⋅m) of torque. According to BYD Auto, the Qin has a top speed of 185 km/h (115 mph) and can accelerate from 0–100 km/h (0–62 mph) in less than 5.9 seconds. Thanks to its smaller battery and increased wheelbase, the Qin will have more interior space than the F3DM, and the styling has also been improved over BYD's earlier models, most notably in the car's interior.

Retail sales of the BYD Qin began in Costa Rica in November 2013, and BYD planned to start sales in other countries in Central and South America in 2014.

Pre-facelift styling (2012–2017)

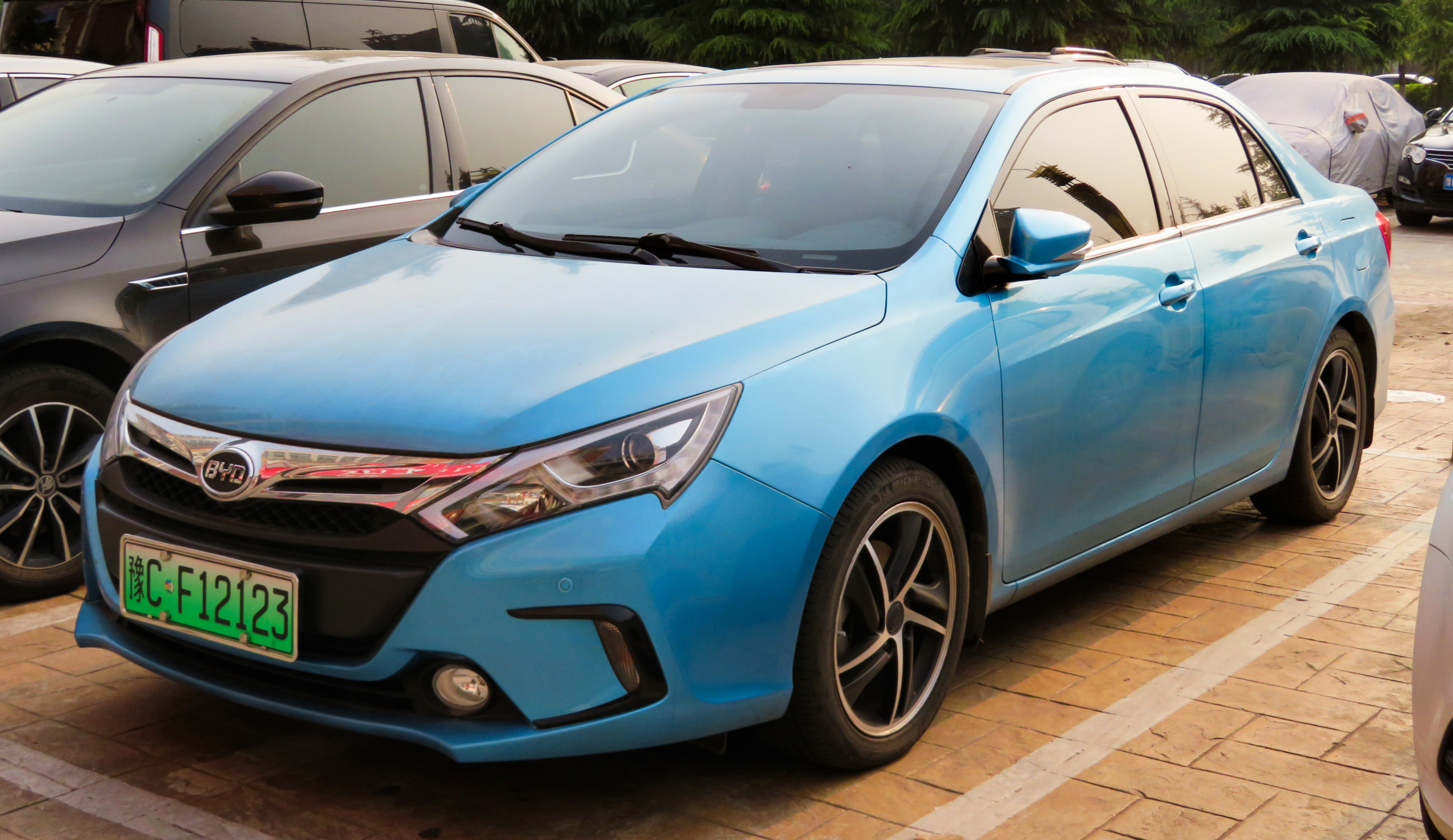
Pre-facelift BYD Qin front.

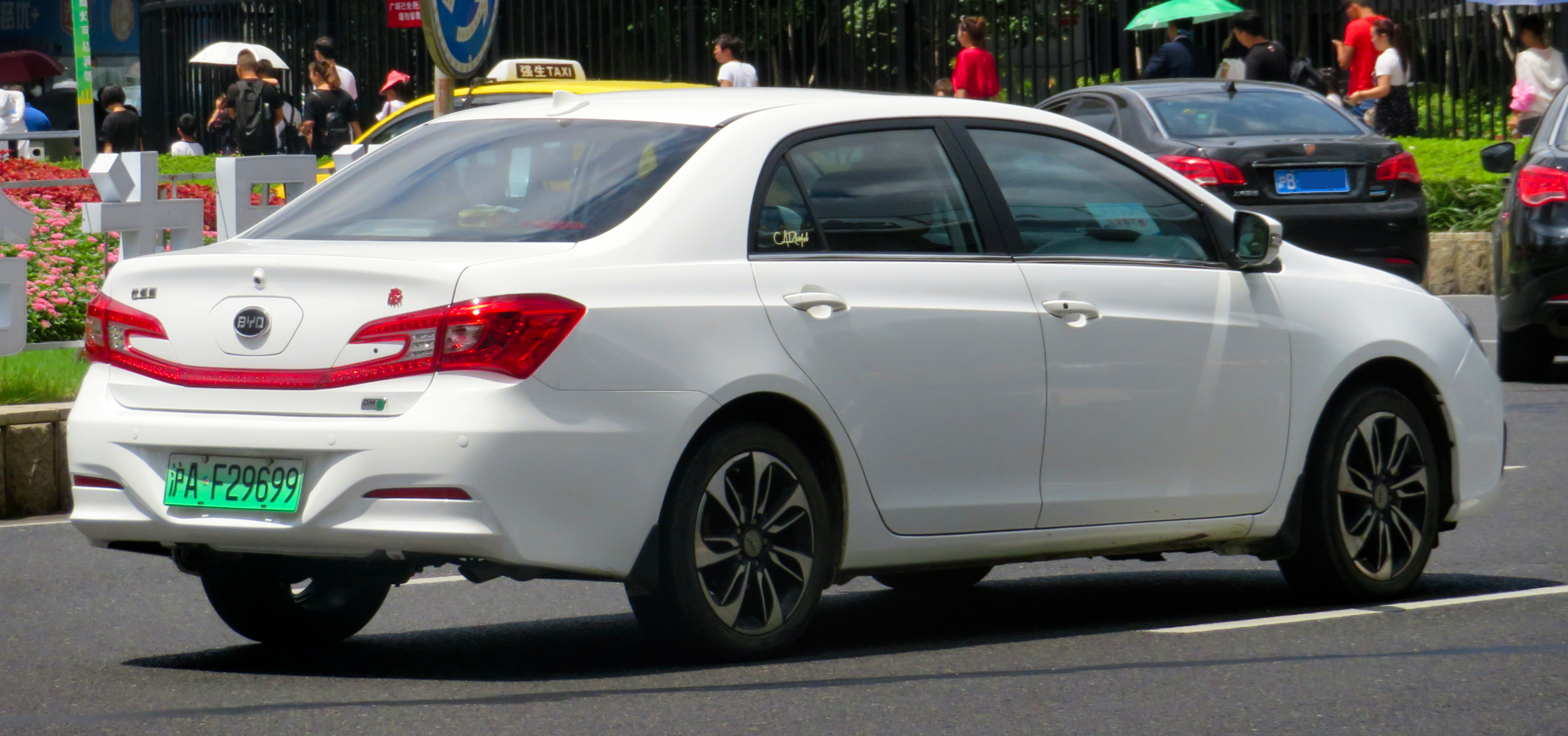
Pre-facelift BYD Qin rear.

Post-facelift styling (2017–2019)

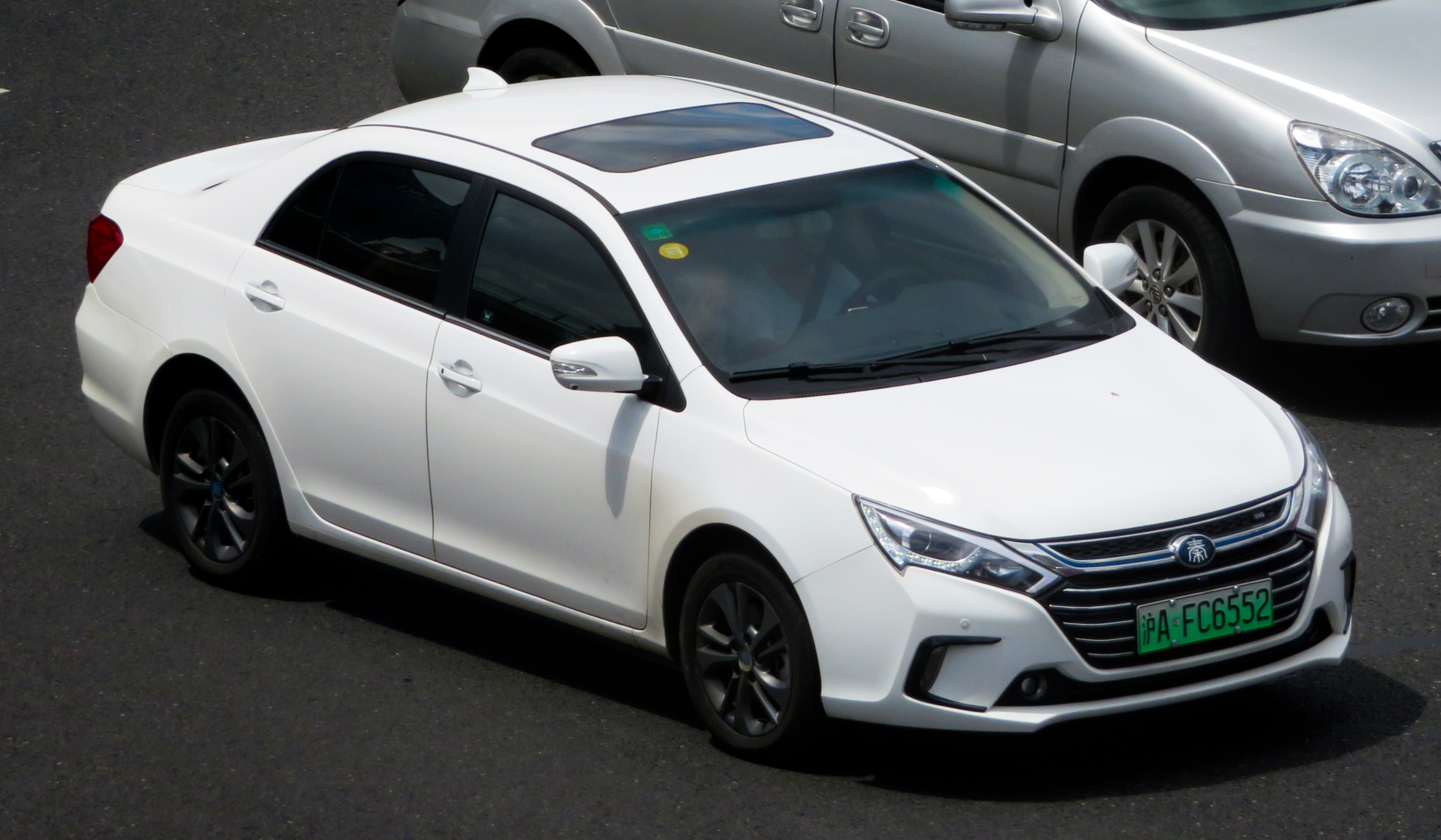
BYD Qin facelift front.

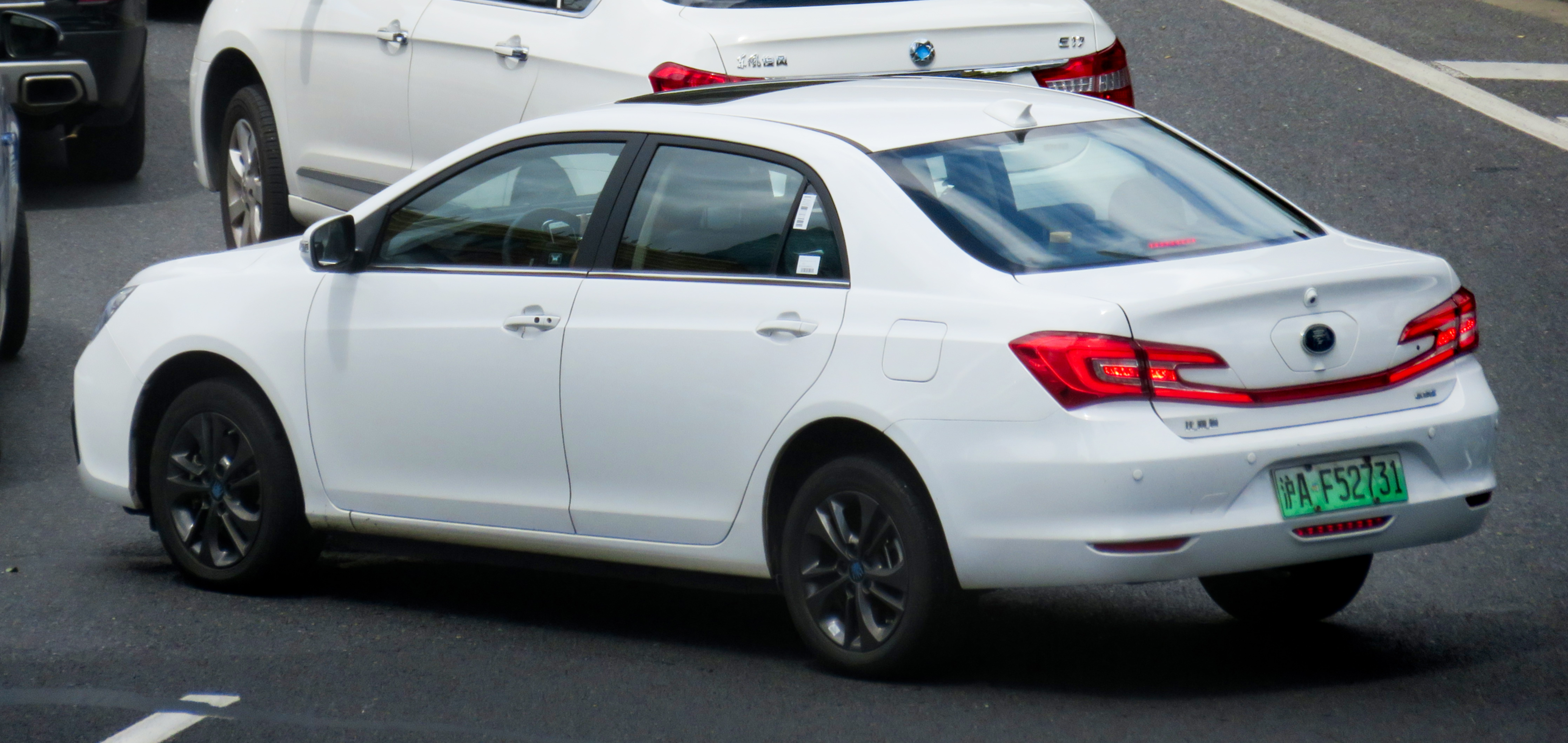
BYD Qin facelift rear.

=== Qin EV300 ===
A pure battery electric version, the Qin EV300, was released in China in March 2016. The BYD Qin EV300 is powered by a 218 hp electric motor and a battery pack that is expected to deliver a range of 300 km (190 mi). Top speed is 150 kilometres per hour (93 mph). There are four versions of the Qin EV300.

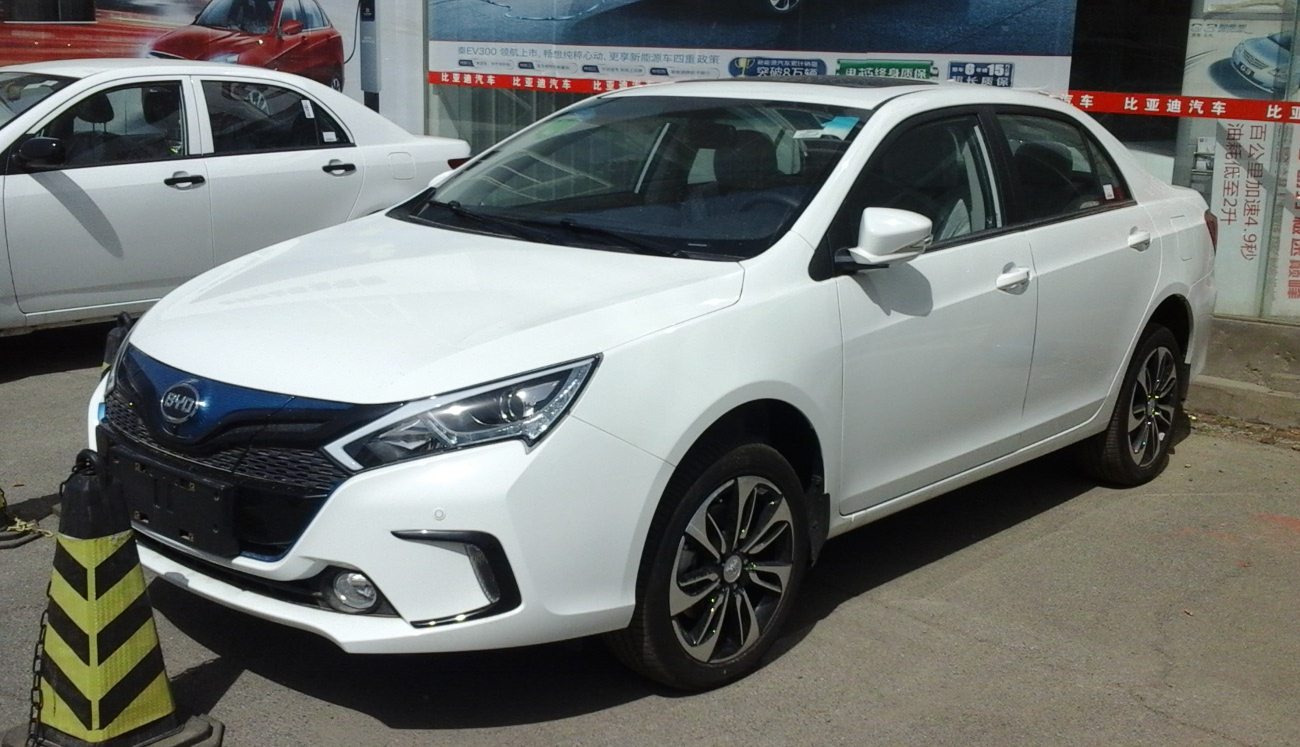
BYD Qin EV300

=== 2019 refresh ===
Despite the introduction of the Qin Pro in 2018, an updated version of the first-generation Qin is also in production as of 2019. The manufacturer refers to it as the "all-new Qin" (全新秦).

The new model uses the "dragon face" styling of the front end, with some changes to the taillights. The vehicle is shorter than the initial model (4,675 mm (184.1 in) vs 4,740 mm (186.6 in)), while the wheelbase and the width remain same.

While the initial model was offered as a plug-in hybrid or with an all-electric drivetrain, the updated model is offered with a petrol engine or with an all-electric drivetrain.

In the all-electric variant, the battery capacity is 53.1 kWh (191 MJ). It is available in two trims: Travel and High Endurance with 400 kilometres of range for the Travel version and 421 kilometres for the High Endurance version. Taxicab versions can be found in various cities such as Sanming in the Fujian Province, Zhengzhou in the Henan Province, and Nanjing in the Jiangsu Province.

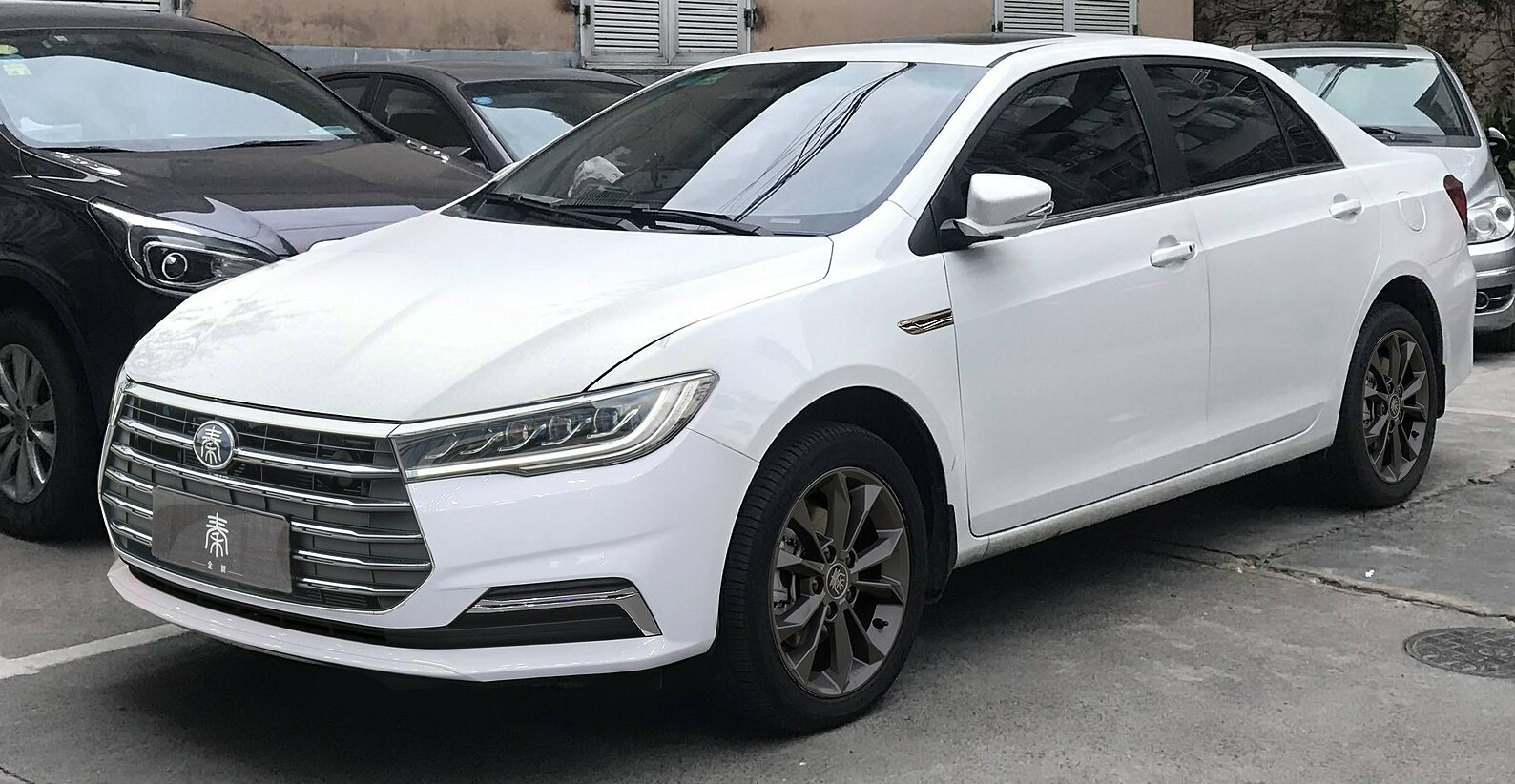
2019 BYD Qin facelift front.

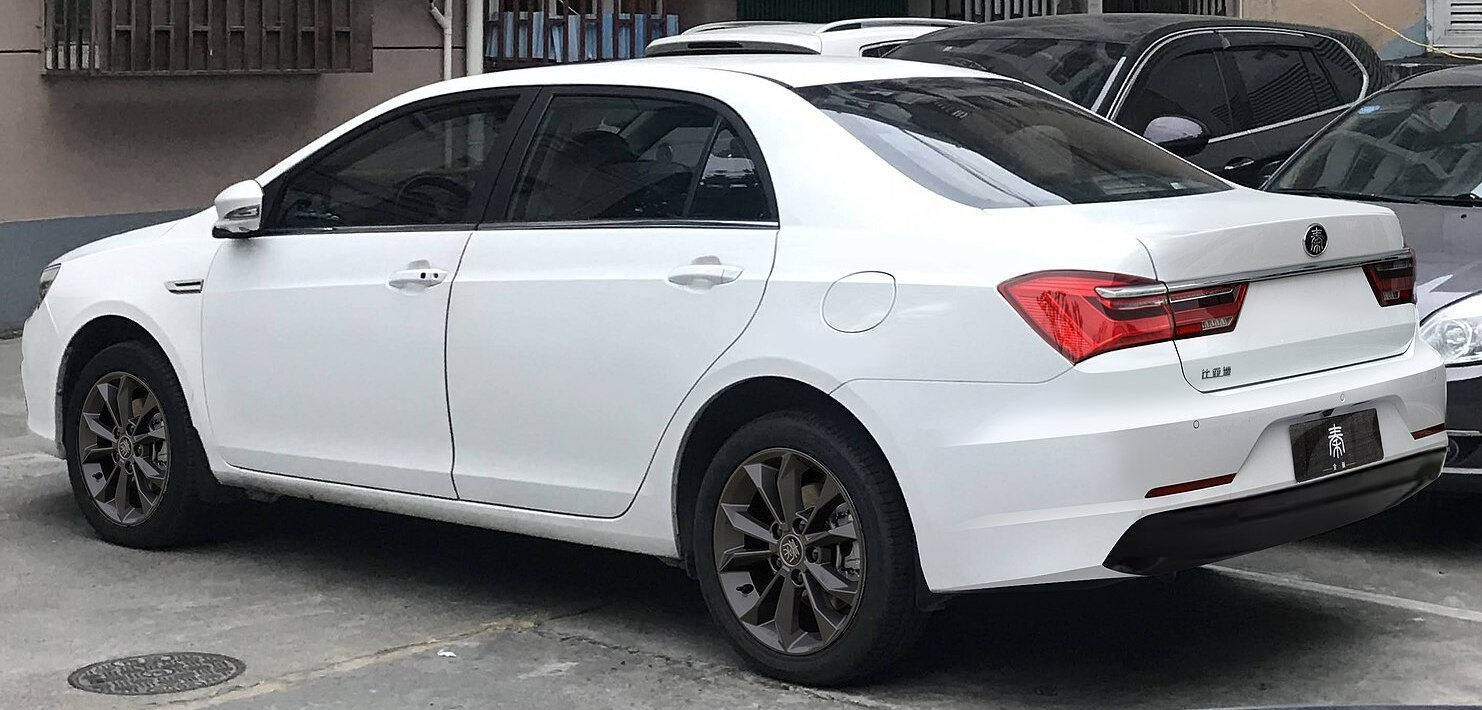
2019 BYD Qin facelift rear.

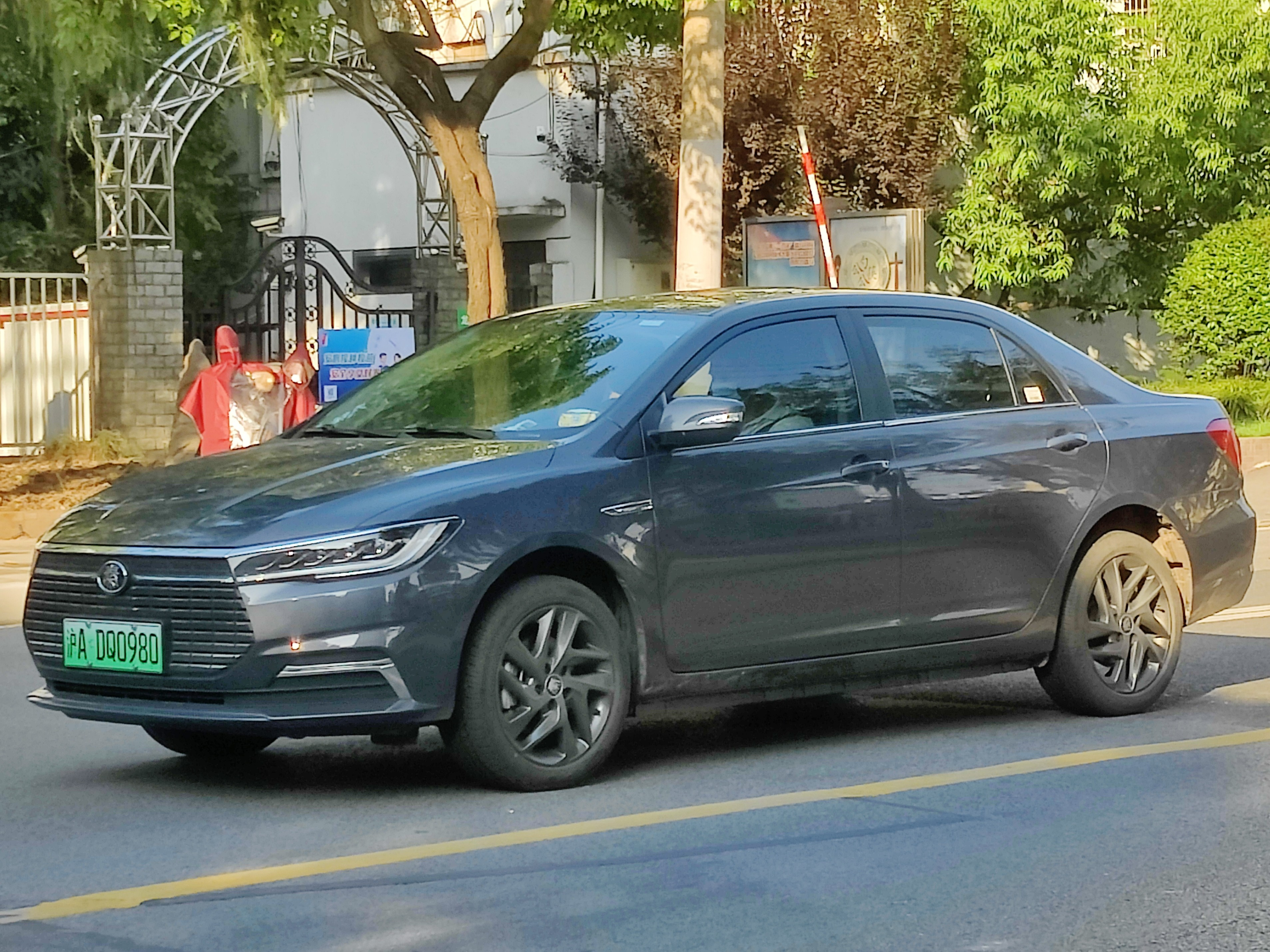
2019 BYD Qin EV facelift front.

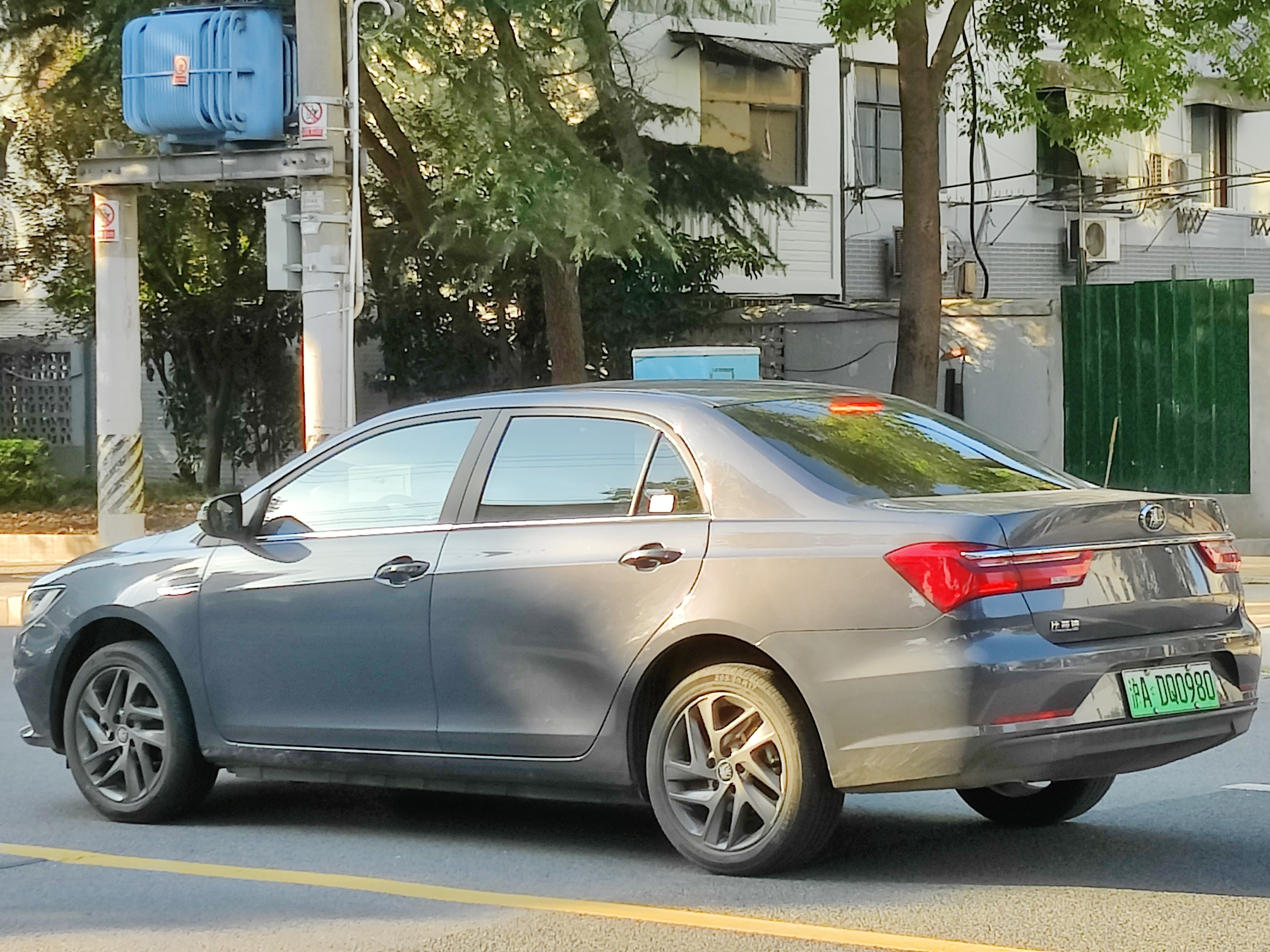
2019 BYD Qin EV facelift rear.

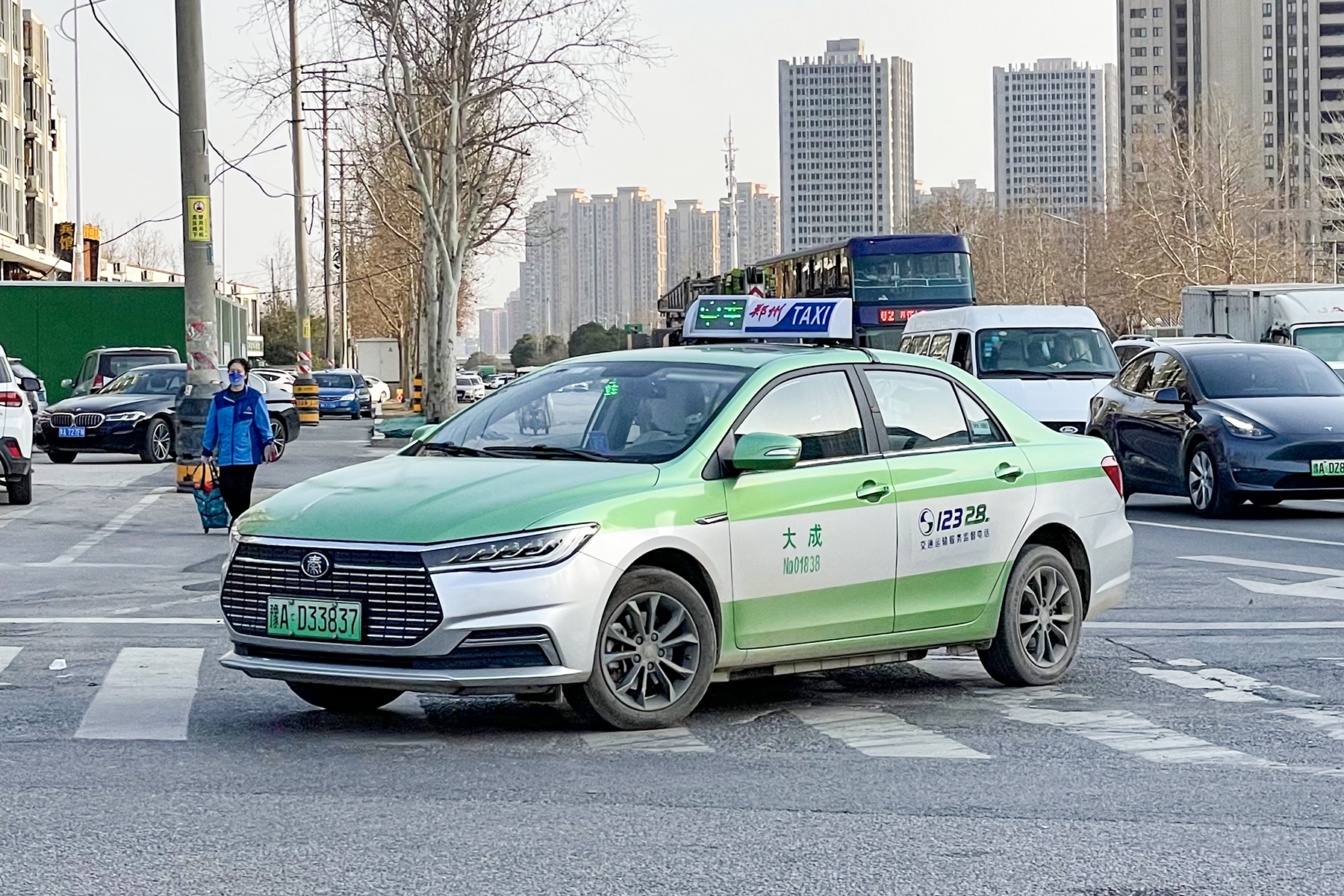
BYD Qin taxi in Zhengzhou

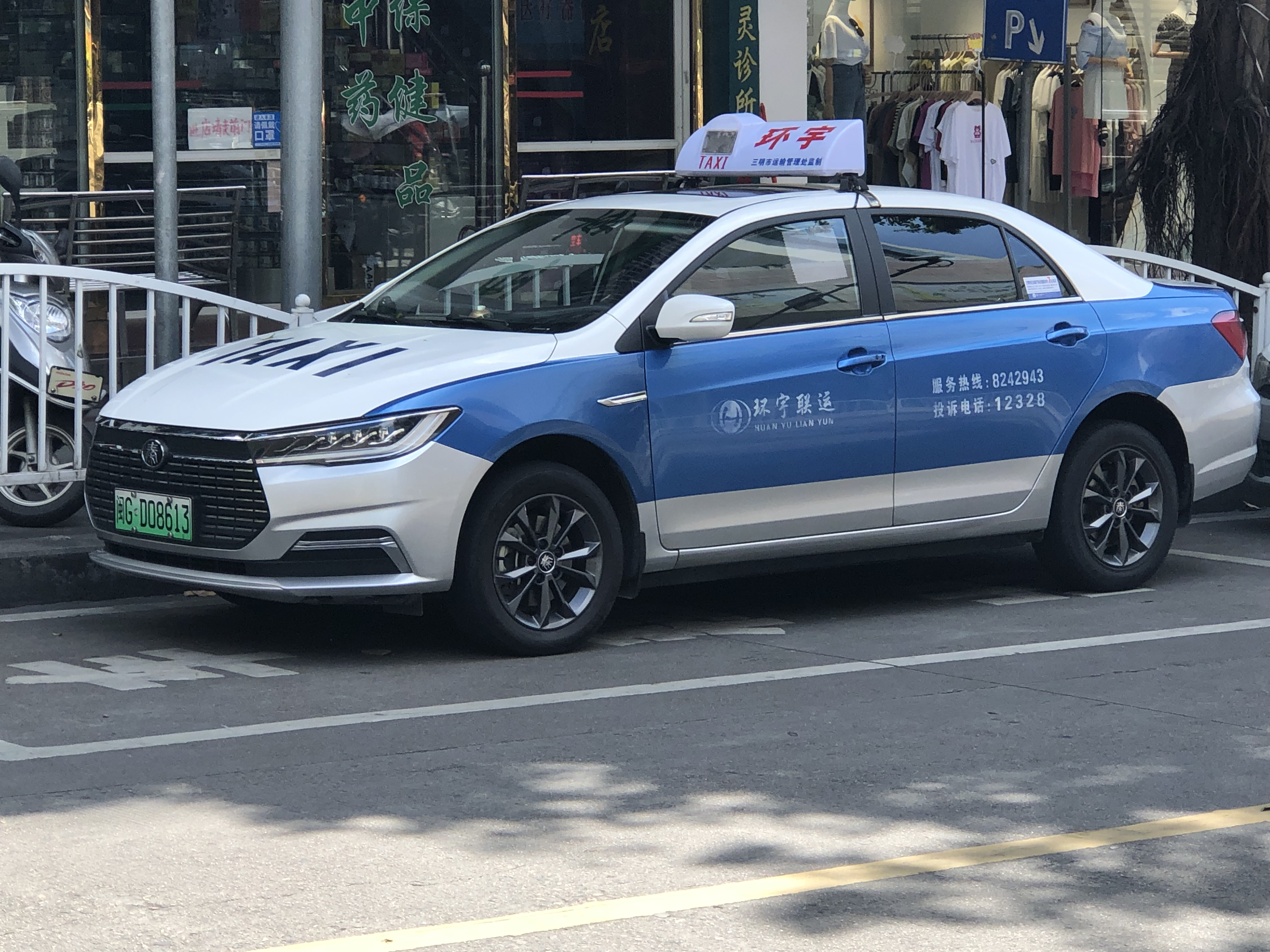
BYD Qin EV Facelift Taxi Sanming

== Qin Pro (2018) ==
Qin Pro / Qin Plus
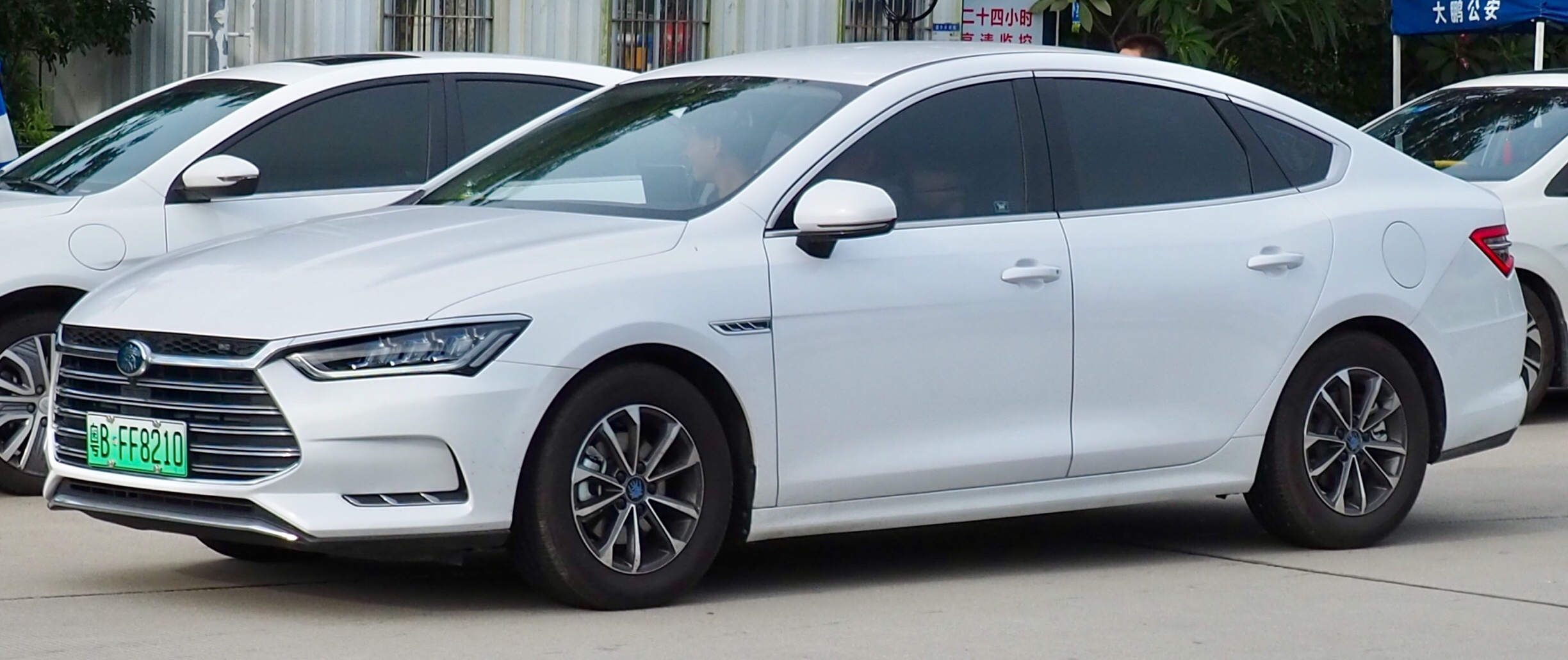
- BYD Qin Pro

Overview
- Production: September 2018 – March 2021
- Assembly: China: Xi'an, Shaanxi; Hefei, Anhui
- Designer: Under the lead of Wolfgang Egger

Body and chassis
- Layout: Front-engine, front-wheel-drive; Front-engine, front-motor, front-wheel drive (DM); Front-motor, front-wheel-drive (EV)

Powertrain
- Engine: Petrol: 1.5 L BYD476ZQA I4 turbo (2018–2021); Petrol plug-in hybrid: 1.5 L BYD476ZQA I4 turbo (DM)
- Electric motor: Permanent magnet synchronous (DM/EV)
- Transmission: 6-speed Mitsubishi W6MG1 manual; 6-speed DCT

Dimensions
- Wheelbase: 2,718 mm (107.0 in)
- Length: 4,765 mm (187.6 in)
- Width: 1,837 mm (72.3 in)
- Height: 1,495 mm (58.9 in)

The second generation Qin was introduced as the Qin Pro in 2018. With its enlarged dimensions, the sedan occupies a higher segment, commonly known as the "A+ class" in China which is larger than the global C-segment.

=== Qin Pro (2018) ===
The BYD Qin Pro debuted at the 2018 Beijing Auto Show. Initially sold alongside the first generation BYD Qin, it is the first BYD sedan to be designed by BYD's new chief designer, Wolfgang Egger.

The Qin Pro uses a "Dragon Face" design of the front grille. It is equipped with a rotating DiLink 12.8-inch touchscreen, and a suite of advanced safety and driver-assistance systems including an adaptive cruise control system with stop-and-go (ACC-S&G) and an automatic emergency braking system (AEB). High-strength steel comprises 73.5% of the weight of the car's body in white (in the petrol variant).

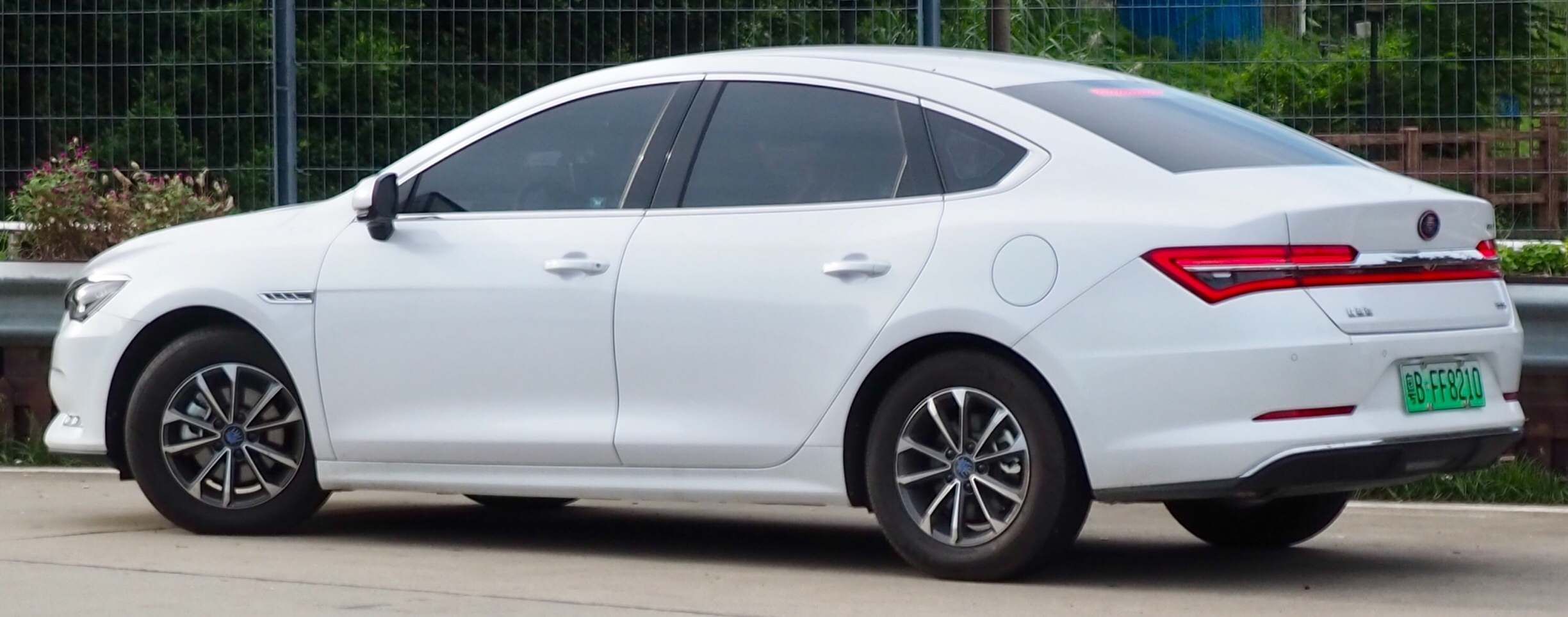
Rear view

==== Powertrain ====
BYD offered three different powertrains for the Qin Pro, including battery electric, plug-in hybrid, and as a conventional petrol ICE vehicle.

The plug-in hybrid Qin Pro DM is powered by a 154 hp (115 kW; 156 PS) 1.5-litre turbo, inline four engine combined with a 150 hp (112 kW; 152 PS) electric motor to produce a total of 304 hp (227 kW; 308 PS). The top speed of the Qin Pro DM is 200 km/h (124 mph) and can accelerate from 0 to 100 km/h (0 to 62 mph) in 5.9 seconds.

The battery electric Qin Pro EV features a 69.5 kWh battery in the top version.

== Qin Plus (2021) ==
The Qin Plus (Chinese: 秦PLUS) was initially revealed in 2021 as the refreshed version of the Qin Pro, with aesthetic changes and additional powertrain updates. Subsequently, a second generation was announced in 2026.

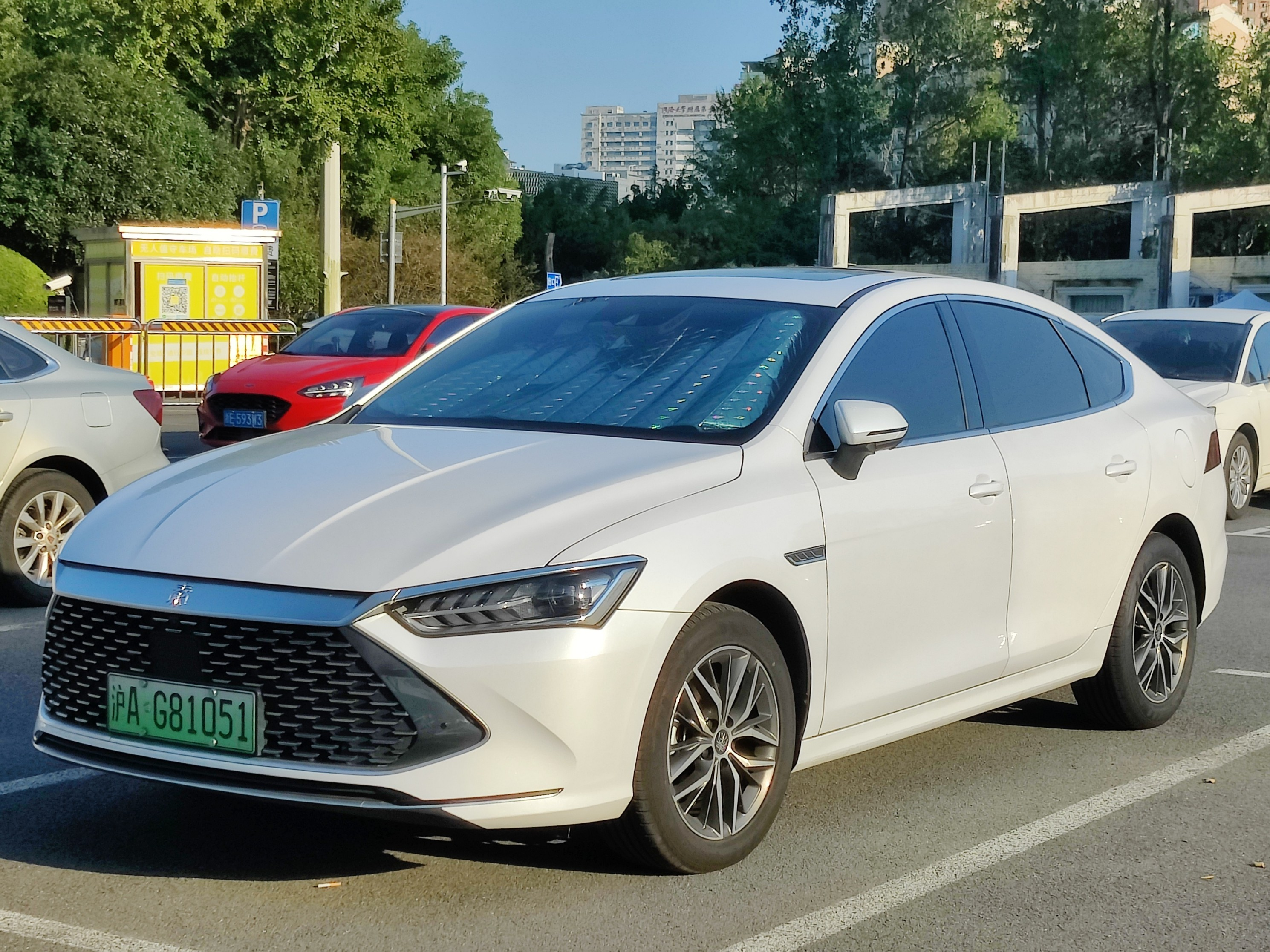
2021 BYD Qin Plus

== Qin L DM-i (2024) ==
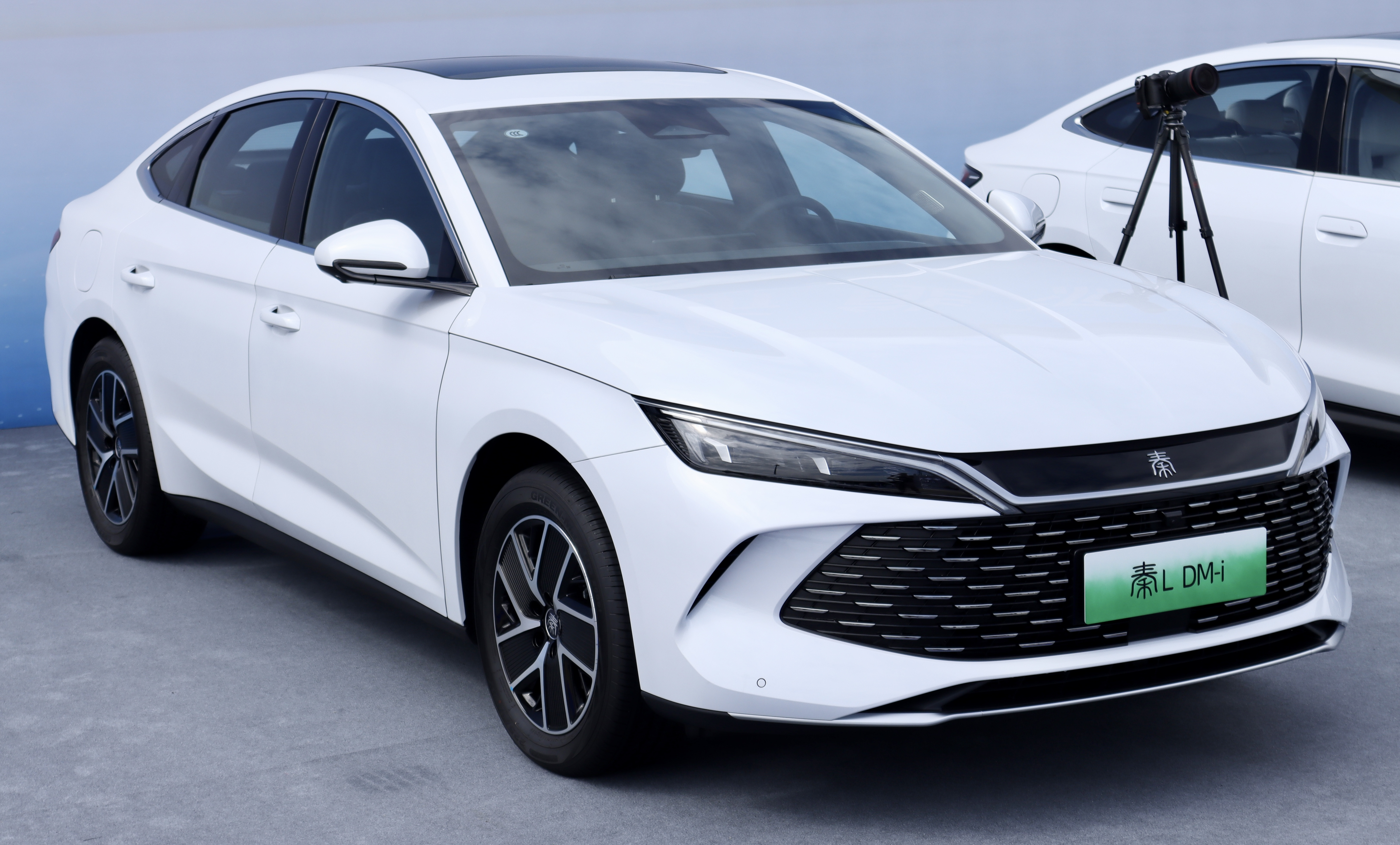
2024 BYD Qin L DM-i

The Qin L DM-i is the largest model in the Qin lineup. It is a plug-in hybrid sedan belonging to the D-segment (mid-size) and was sold since 2024. Along its sister model, the Seal 06 DM-i, it was the first model to debut BYD's DM-i 5.0 powertrain technology.

== Qin L EV (2025) ==
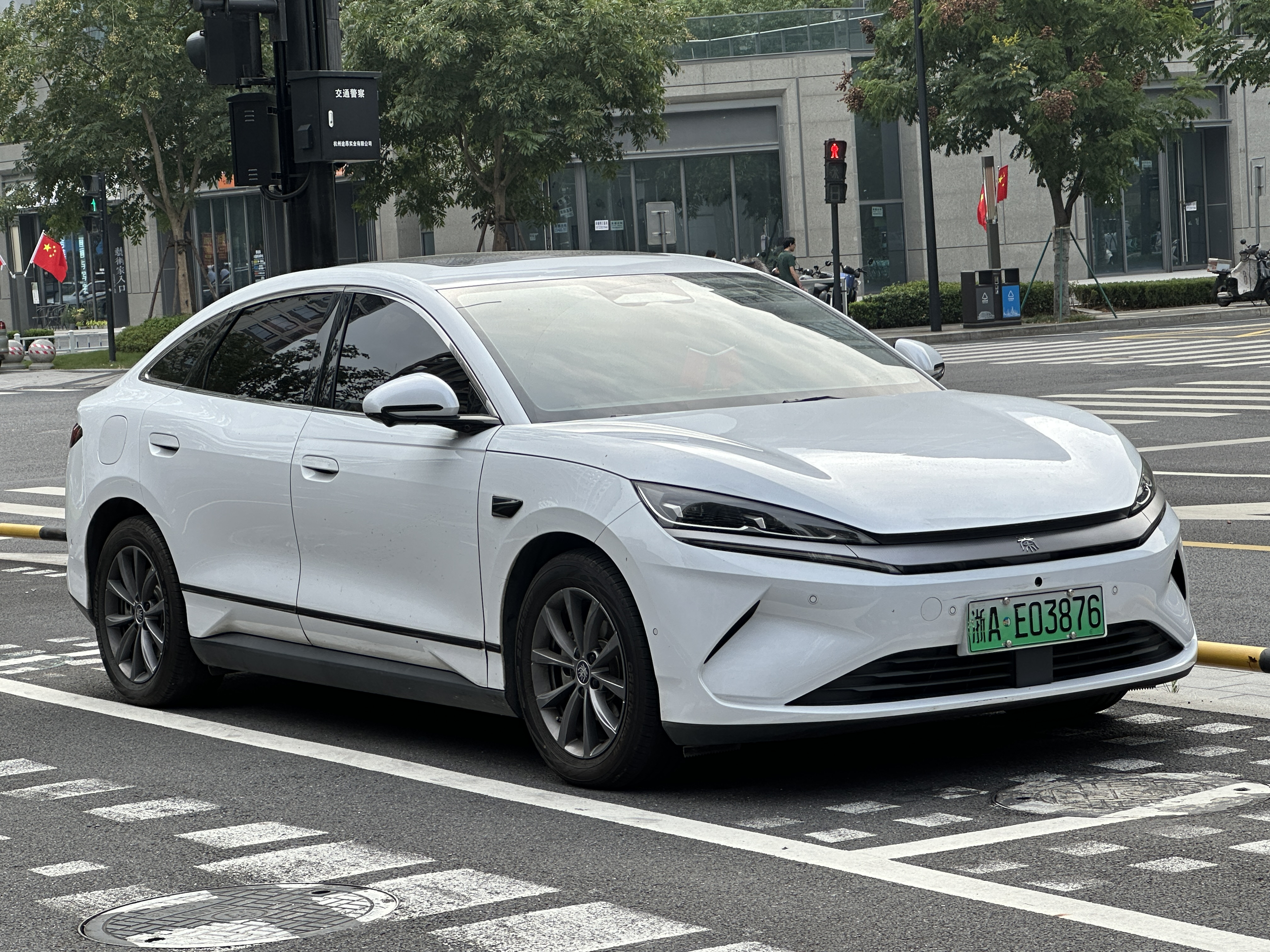
2025 BYD Qin L EV

The Qin L EV is a mid-size battery-electric sedan introduced in 2025. Despite sharing a similar name to the Qin L DM-i, it is completely structurally unrelated to it and rides on the e-Platform 3.0 Evo battery electric platform with a rear-wheel-drive layout. It has a sister model, the Seal 06 EV.

== Qin Max (2026) ==
2026 BYD Qin Max

The Qin Max was launched in the middle of 2026 as the largest model in the Qin series. It shares most of its bodywork with the Qin L EV but with an elongated body, differentiated front and rear fascia and both DM-i (plug-in hybrid) and EV powertrains.

== Production and sales ==
Year	China								
Year	Qin	Qin EV	Qin Pro (ICE)	Qin Pro DM/EV	Qin Plus DM	Qin Plus EV	Qin L DM-i	Qin L EV	Total
2015	25,579	—	—	—	—	—	—	—	25,579
2016	22,614	10,182	—	—	—	—	—	—	32,796
2017	20,623	4,873	—	—	—	—	—	—	25,496
2018	38,859	7,851	6,916	12,245	—	—	—	—	65,871
2019	8,328	5,503	17,772	20,586	—	—	—	—	52,189
2020	16,599	41,621	12,638	11,326	—	—	—	—	82,184
2021	2,086	19,477	2,138	712	169,807	56,151	—	—	194,220
2022	—	33,792	—	—	195,349	119,933	—	—	349,074
2023	—	26,282	—	—	327,371	128,492	—	—	482,145
2024	—	7,909	—	—	304,388	175,637	229,591	—	709,616
2025	—	12,358	—	—	276,892	110,433	192,623	72,048	664,354

== See also ==
- List of BYD Auto vehicles
