= BYD Qin Max =

Mid-size sedan

Overview
- Manufacturer: BYD Auto
- Production: 2026–present
- Model years: 2027–present
- Assembly: China
- Designer: Under the lead of Wolfgang Egger

Body and chassis
- Class: Mid-size car (D-segment)
- Body style: 4-door sedan
- Layout: Rear-motor, rear-wheel-drive (EV); Front-motor, front-wheel-drive (PHEV)
- Platform: e-Platform 3.0 Evo
- Related: BYD Qin L EV; BYD Seal 06 EV; BYD e7

Powertrain
- Electric motor: Permanent magnet synchronous
- Power output: 120–240 kW (163–326 PS; 161–322 hp)
- Battery: EV: 52.868 kWh BYD Blade 2.0 LFP; 64.365 kWh BYD Blade 2.0 LFP; PHEV: 25.287 kWh BYD Blade LFP; 34.275 kWh BYD Blade LFP
- Electric range: EV: 530–630 km (329–391 mi) (CLTC); PHEV: 230–320 km (143–199 mi) (CLTC)

Dimensions
- Wheelbase: 2,820 mm (111.0 in)
- Length: 4,866 mm (191.6 in)
- Width: 1,880 mm (74.0 in)
- Height: 1,495 mm (58.9 in)

The BYD Qin Max (Chinese: 比亚迪秦Max) is a battery electric and plug-in hybrid mid-size sedan produced by BYD Auto. The Qin Max is the flagship of BYD's compact to mid-size Qin sedan range, which is part of BYD's Dynasty series vehicles, positioned above the Qin L. The Qin Max is built on the e-Platform 3.0 Evo battery electric platform.

== Overview ==
Rear view

The Qin Max was officially launched in August 2026 in China, though early filings for the Qin Max EV made by China Ministry of Industry and Information Technology (MIIT) were released as early as December 2025.

=== Design and equipment ===
The Qin Max shares many components with the smaller Qin L EV, including the side profile, the general shape and most body panels. However, it has been stretched in length but retains the similar wheelbase as the Qin L EV, while receiving a redesigned front and rear. It adopts an evolution of the BYD Dynasty series’ Dragon Face design language, including a characteristic front face and taillights inspired by Chinese knots.

The interior is also largely carried over from the Qin L EV. It features a 15.6-inch central infotainment display, LCD instrument cluster, AR heads-up display, built-in cooler and refrigerator, and a new two-spoke steering wheel recently adopted for many BYD models.

== Powertrain and specifications ==
The Qin Max is based on the 800 volt e-Platform 3.8 Evo, featuring BYD's flash-charging technology that allows charging from 10% to 70% in five minutes. It also uses BYD's second generation Blade (LFP) battery.

The battery electric "EV" version of the Qin Max has a single rear-mounted motor with a peak power of either 120 kW (160 hp; 160 PS) or 240 kW (320 hp; 330 PS), with a rated CLTC driving range of up to 639 km (397 mi). Meanwhile, the plug-in hybrid version "DM-i" of the Qin Max utilizes the fifth-generation DM technology with a 1.5-liter naturally aspirated engine and a 175 kW (235 hp; 238 PS) front-mounted motor.

It is further equipped with the God’s Eye B intelligent driving assistance system. The Qin Max uses a MacPherson front suspension and a five-link independent rear suspension setup. Higher trim levels could be equipped with the DiSus-C intelligent damping body control system providing road preview capabilities.

== See also ==
- List of BYD Auto vehicles
