= BYD Qin L EV =

Battery electric mid-size sedan

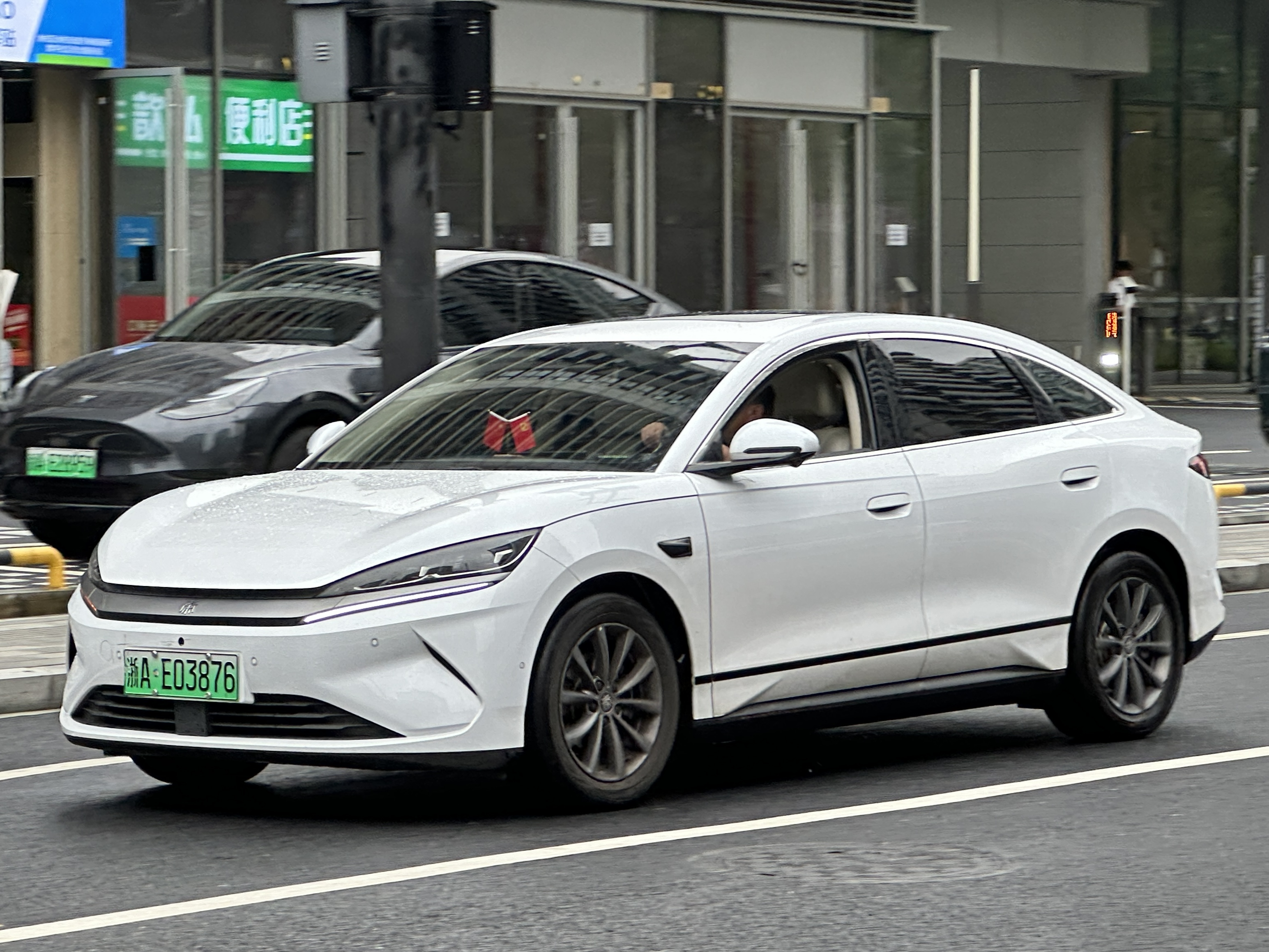

Overview
- Manufacturer: BYD Auto
- Also called: BYD Seal 6 EV (global)
- Production: March 2025 – present
- Model years: 2025–2026 (China)
- Assembly: China: Hefei, Anhui
- Designer: Under the lead of Wolfgang Egger

Body and chassis
- Class: Mid-size car (D-segment)
- Body style: 4-door sedan
- Layout: Rear-motor, rear-wheel-drive
- Platform: e-Platform 3.0 Evo
- Related: BYD Qin Max; BYD Seal 06 EV; BYD e7

Powertrain
- Electric motor: Permanent magnet synchronous
- Power output: 95–160 kW (129–218 PS; 127–215 hp)
- Battery: 46.08 kWh BYD Blade LFP; 56.64 kWh BYD Blade LFP
- Electric range: 470–545 km (292–339 mi) (CLTC); 410–485 km (255–301 mi) (NEDC)

Dimensions
- Wheelbase: 2,820 mm (111.0 in)
- Length: 4,720 mm (185.8 in)
- Width: 1,880 mm (74.0 in)
- Height: 1,495 mm (58.9 in)
- Curb weight: 1,670–1,800 kg (3,682–3,968 lb)

The BYD Qin L EV (Chinese: 比亚迪秦L EV) is a battery electric mid-size sedan produced by BYD Auto. A sister model of the BYD Seal 06 EV from the Ocean Series, Qin L EV is built on the e-Platform 3.0 Evo battery electric platform with a rear-wheel-drive layout. It is BYD's Dynasty Series product line-up. It is unrelated to the similarly named Qin L DM-i, which is also a mid-size sedan but uses a plug-in hybrid powertrain. It is part of the BYD Qin series.

== History ==
The Qin L EV was first introduced in February 2025. It was launched in China on 27 March 2025, with three variants: 470 km Leading, 545 km Transcendance and 545 km Excellence.

== Design and equipment ==
The exterior of the Qin L EV adopts the series’ Dragon Face design language. The front fascia is split with triangular headlights on both sides, the Qin (秦) character located at the centre of the chrome decorative plate which is also illuminated, and a closed grille. For the side, the door handles of an outward-flip design and the charging port is located on the right rear fender. The rear fascia features a single taillight bar adopting the series’ Chinese knot design, the black trim surround used for the taillights echoes the front surround trim piece for the headlights, and the blue God’s Eye badge states it is equipped with the God’s Eye C (DiPilot 100) intelligent driving assistance system.

The interior of the Qin L EV has a four-spoke flat-bottom design steering wheel, full LCD driver's instrument panel, rotatable central touchscreen that is equipped with the advanced version of the DiLink 100 smart cockpit system, and an electronic gear shifter used for the automatic transmission is mounted behind the steering wheel. The centre tunnel features a refrigerator storage box which also has a heating function, two cup holders, two wireless phone charging pads, and a number of physical buttons. There is a 65 L (2.3 cu ft) frunk storage.

For safety, the Qin L EV features God’s Eye C (DiPilot 100) intelligent driving assistance system which supports the Navigation On Autopilot (NOA) function on highways.

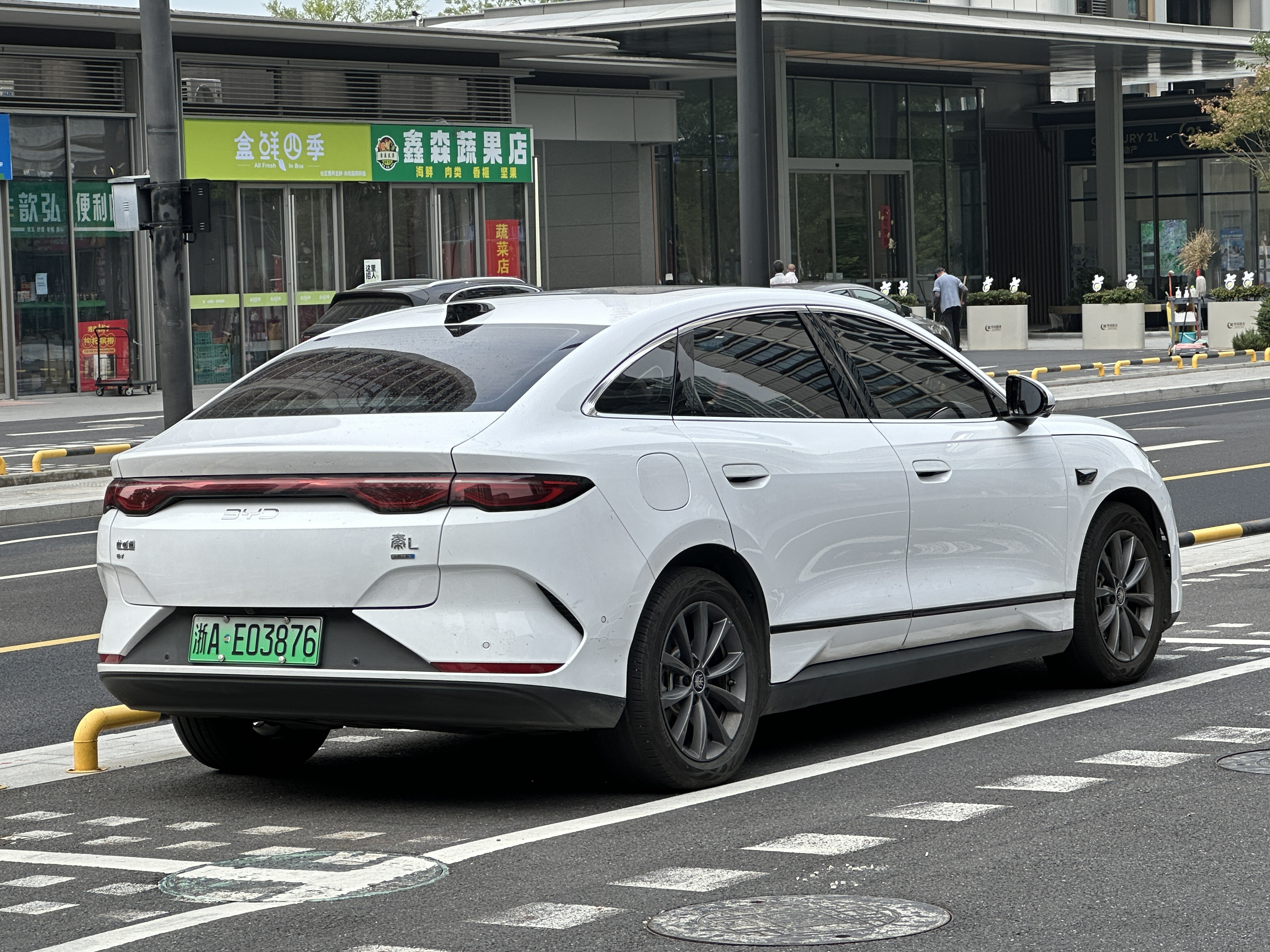
Rear view

== International markets ==
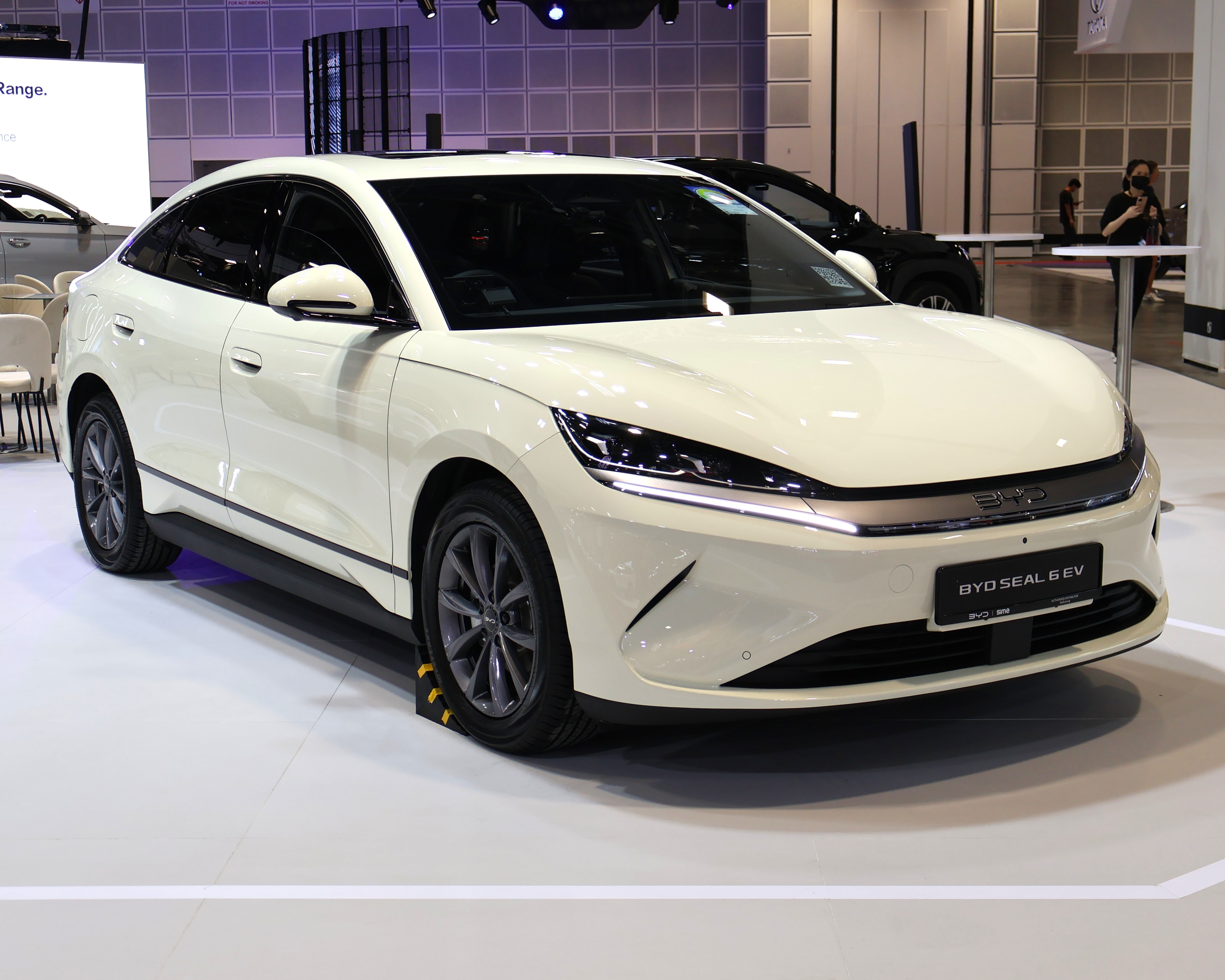
BYD Seal 6 EV (Singapore)

=== Malaysia ===
The Qin L EV made its international debut in Malaysia on 26 September 2025 under the name BYD Seal 6 EV. It is available with two variants: Dynamic and Premium, both variants use the 56.64 kWh battery pack.

=== Singapore ===
The Seal 6 EV was launched in Singapore on 1 October 2025, in the sole Premium variant using the 56.64 kWh battery pack.

=== Thailand ===
The Seal 6 EV was launched in Thailand on 16 March 2026, was available with two variants: Dynamic and Premium. In July 2026, the Standard variant was added as the entry-level variant.

== Powertrain ==
Version	Battery	Layout	Electric motor		0–50 km/h (0–31 mph)(claimed)	Electric range (claimed)	Calendar years
Version	Battery	Layout	Power	Torque	0–50 km/h (0–31 mph)(claimed)	CLTC	Calendar years
470 km Leading	46.08 kWh LFP Blade battery	RWD	110 kW (148 hp)	220 N⋅m (162 lb⋅ft)	4.1 seconds	470 km (292 mi)	2025–present
545 km Transcendance 545 km Excellence	56.64 kWh LFP Blade battery	RWD	160 kW (215 hp)	330 N⋅m (243 lb⋅ft)	3.1 seconds	545 km (339 mi)	2025–present

=== International version ===
Version	Battery	Layout	Electric motor		0–100 km/h (0–62 mph)(claimed)	Electric range (claimed)	Calendar years
Version	Battery	Layout	Power	Torque	0–100 km/h (0–62 mph)(claimed)	NEDC	Calendar years
Standard	46.08 kWh LFP Blade battery	RWD	95 kW (127 hp)	220 N⋅m (162 lb⋅ft)	12.5 seconds	410 km (255 mi)	2026–present
Dynamic	56.64 kWh LFP Blade battery	RWD	95 kW (127 hp)	220 N⋅m (162 lb⋅ft)	10.9 seconds	485 km (301 mi)	2026–present
Premium	56.64 kWh LFP Blade battery	RWD	160 kW (215 hp)	330 N⋅m (243 lb⋅ft)	7.5 seconds	485 km (301 mi)	2026–present

== See also ==
- List of BYD Auto vehicles
