= BYD Seal 06 =

Mid-size car

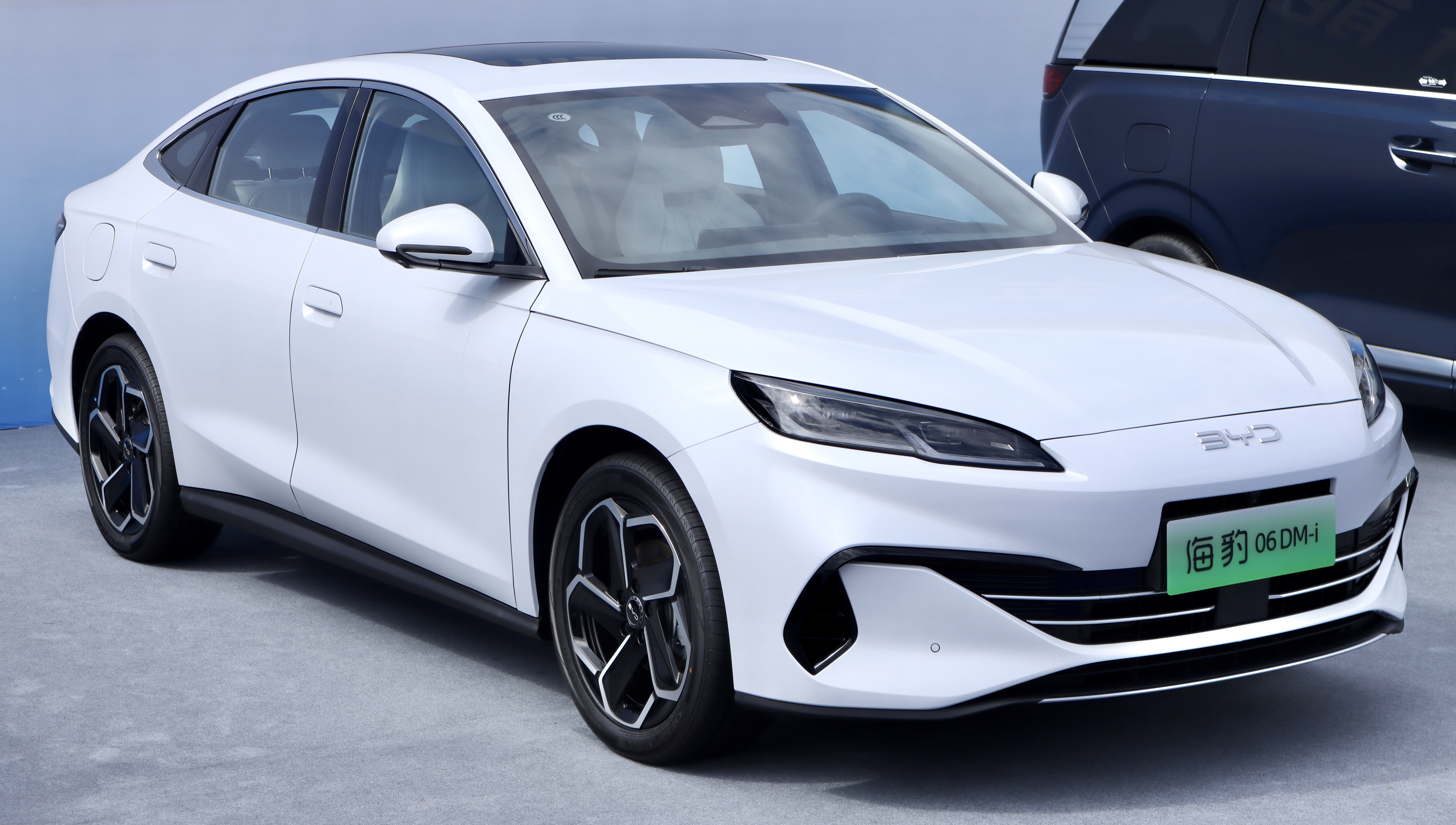

Overview
- Manufacturer: BYD Auto
- Production: 2024–present
- Model years: 2024–present (China)
- Designer: Under the lead of Wolfgang Egger

Body and chassis
- Class: Mid-size car (D-segment)
- Body style: 4-door sedan

The BYD Seal 06 (Chinese: 比亚迪海豹06; pinyin: Bǐyǎdí Hǎibào 06) is a series of mid-size car manufactured by BYD Auto since 2024.

The Seal 06 belongs to BYD's Ocean Series lineup, sold through Ocean Network dealerships, where it is positioned between the smaller Seal 05 and the larger Seal 07; it serves as the Ocean Series counterpart to the Dynasty Series Qin L and Qin Max.

Since its introduction, the Seal 06 series has undergone several lineup changes in China and has been offered with two distinct body designs. It launched in 2024 with a DM-i plug-in hybrid powertrain only, under the internal code HKH. A battery-electric Seal 06 EV followed in 2025 with a different design and platform, under the internal code EUE. In 2026, BYD combined the DM-i and EV powertrains into a single unified design.

== First generation (2024) ==
First generation
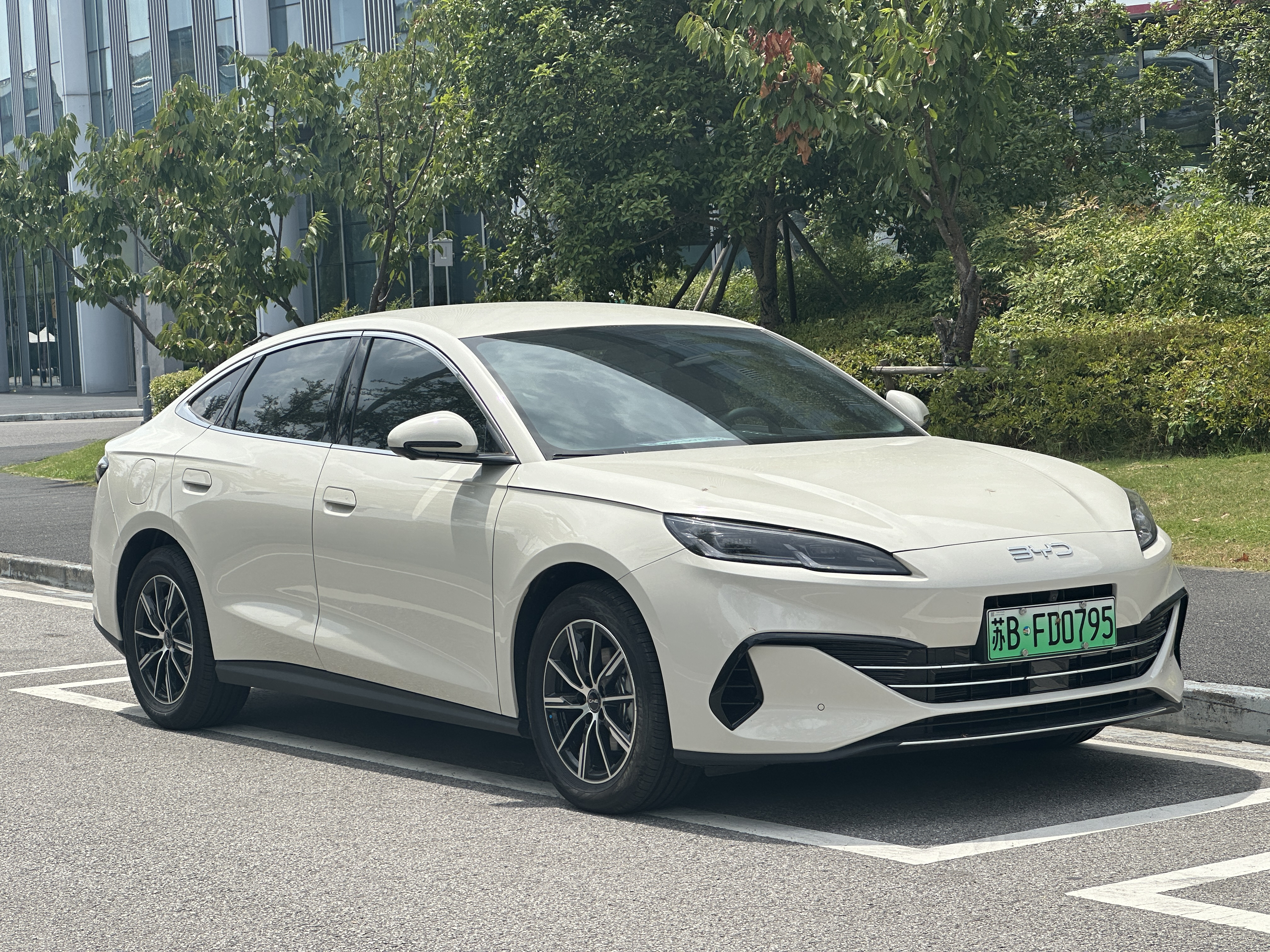

Overview
- Model code: HKH
- Also called: BYD Seal 6 DM-i (export)
- Production: April 2024 – present
- Model years: 2024–2026 (China)
- Assembly: China: Changsha, Hunan; Hefei, Anhui; Zhengzhou, Henan; Jinan, Shandong
- Designer: Under the lead of Wolfgang Egger

Body and chassis
- Body style: 4-door sedan; 5-door station wagon
- Layout: Front-engine, front-motor, front-wheel drive
- Platform: DM-i 5.0 platform
- Related: BYD Qin L DM-i

Powertrain
- Engine: Petrol plug-in hybrid: 1.5 L BYD472QC I4 Atkinson cycle
- Electric motor: Permanent magnet synchronous
- Transmission: E-CVT
- Hybrid drivetrain: Plug-in hybrid
- Battery: 10.08 kWh BYD Blade LFP; 15.87 kWh BYD Blade LFP

Dimensions
- Wheelbase: 2,790 mm (109.8 in)
- Length: 4,830 mm (190.2 in) (sedan); 4,850 mm (190.9 in) (wagon)
- Width: 1,875 mm (73.8 in) (sedan); 1,890 mm (74.4 in) (wagon)
- Height: 1,495 mm (58.9 in) (sedan); 1,505 mm (59.3 in) (wagon)
- Curb weight: 1,660–1,775 kg (3,660–3,913 lb)

The first-generation BYD Seal 06 DM-i debuted at the 2024 Beijing Auto Show in April, and launched in China on 28 May 2024. It shares BYD's fifth-generation plug-in hybrid system marketed as DM-i 5.0 with the Qin L from the 'Dynasty Series'.

=== Design and equipment ===
The exterior of the Seal 06 DM-i adopts the design language from the BYD Ocean vehicle series. It features a closed front fascia, door handles of an outward-flip design, a transparent taillight bar and an illuminated BYD logo on the rear boot lid.

For the suspension, the Seal 06 DM-i has MacPherson struts at the front and a E-type four-link independent setup at the rear.

Inside, the Seal 06 DM-i carries over the Ocean series design for the dashboard and doors. There is a 8.8-inch LCD digital instrument cluster and a rotatable 15.6-inch central touchscreen infotainment system.

The station wagon model was unveiled in April 2025 at the Shanghai Auto Show, and was launched in China on 4 July 2025. The station wagon has a maximum boot capacity of 1,535 L (54.2 cu ft) when the rear seats are folded down, it has a built-in refrigerator with a heating function and the V2L (Vehicle-to-Load) function.

In China, the Seal 06 DM-i saloon is available with five variants: 80 km DM-i Deluxe, 80 km DM-i Prestige, 120 km DM-i Prestige, 120 km DM-i Premium and 120 km DM-i Flagship. While the Seal 06 DM-i Touring is available with three variants: 80 km Noble, 150 km Exclusive and 150 km Flagship.

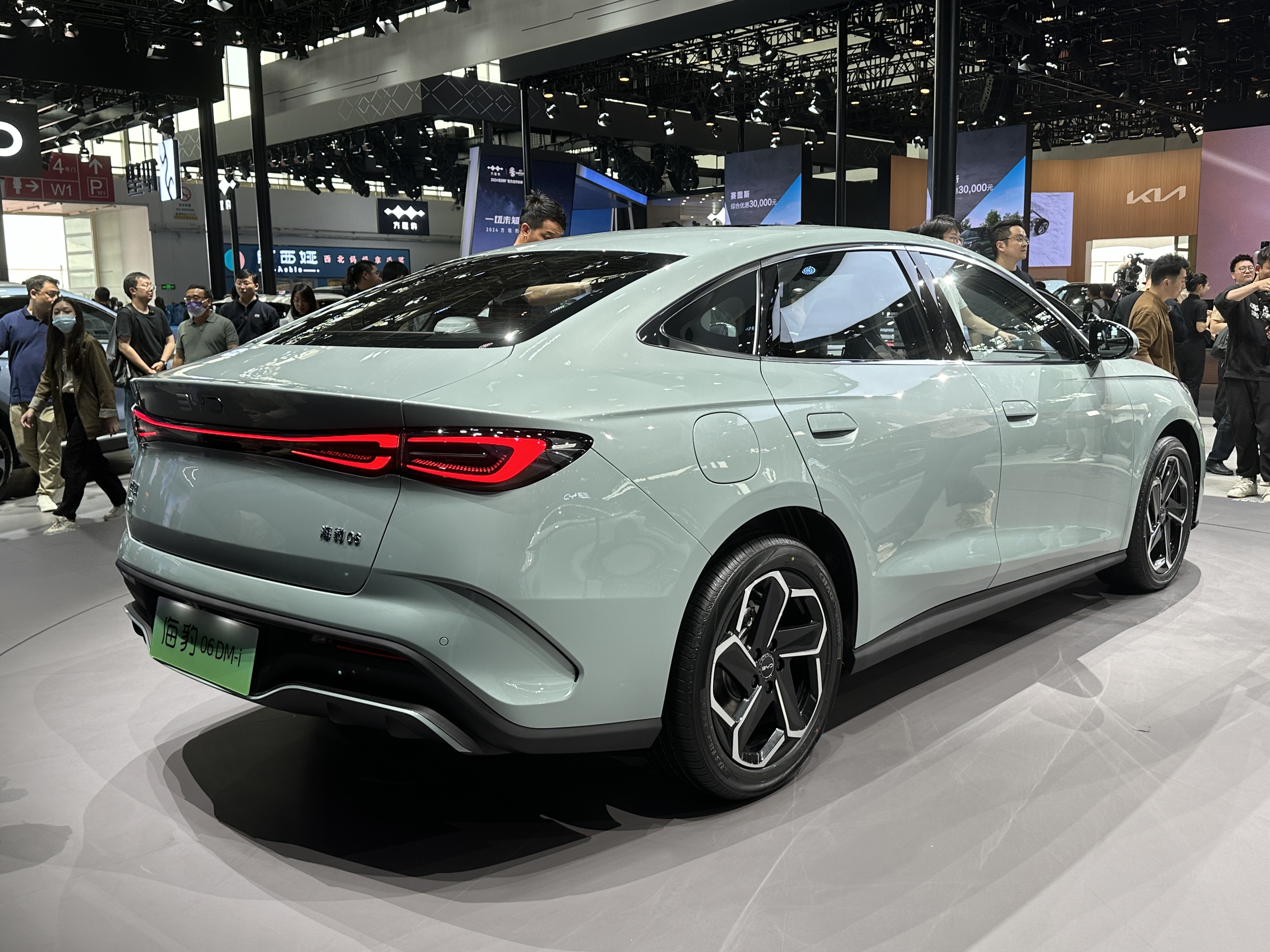
Rear view

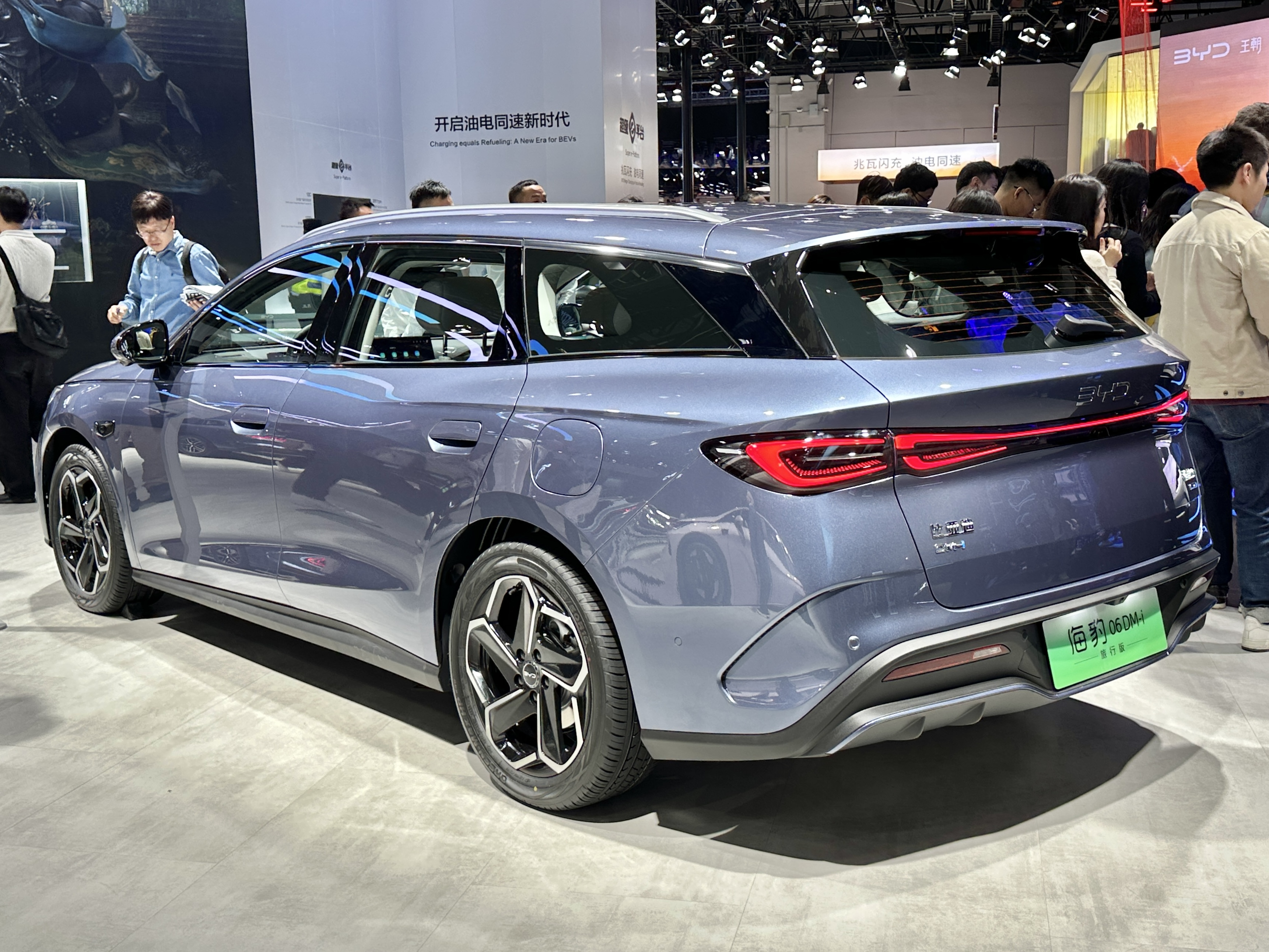
Rear view (wagon)

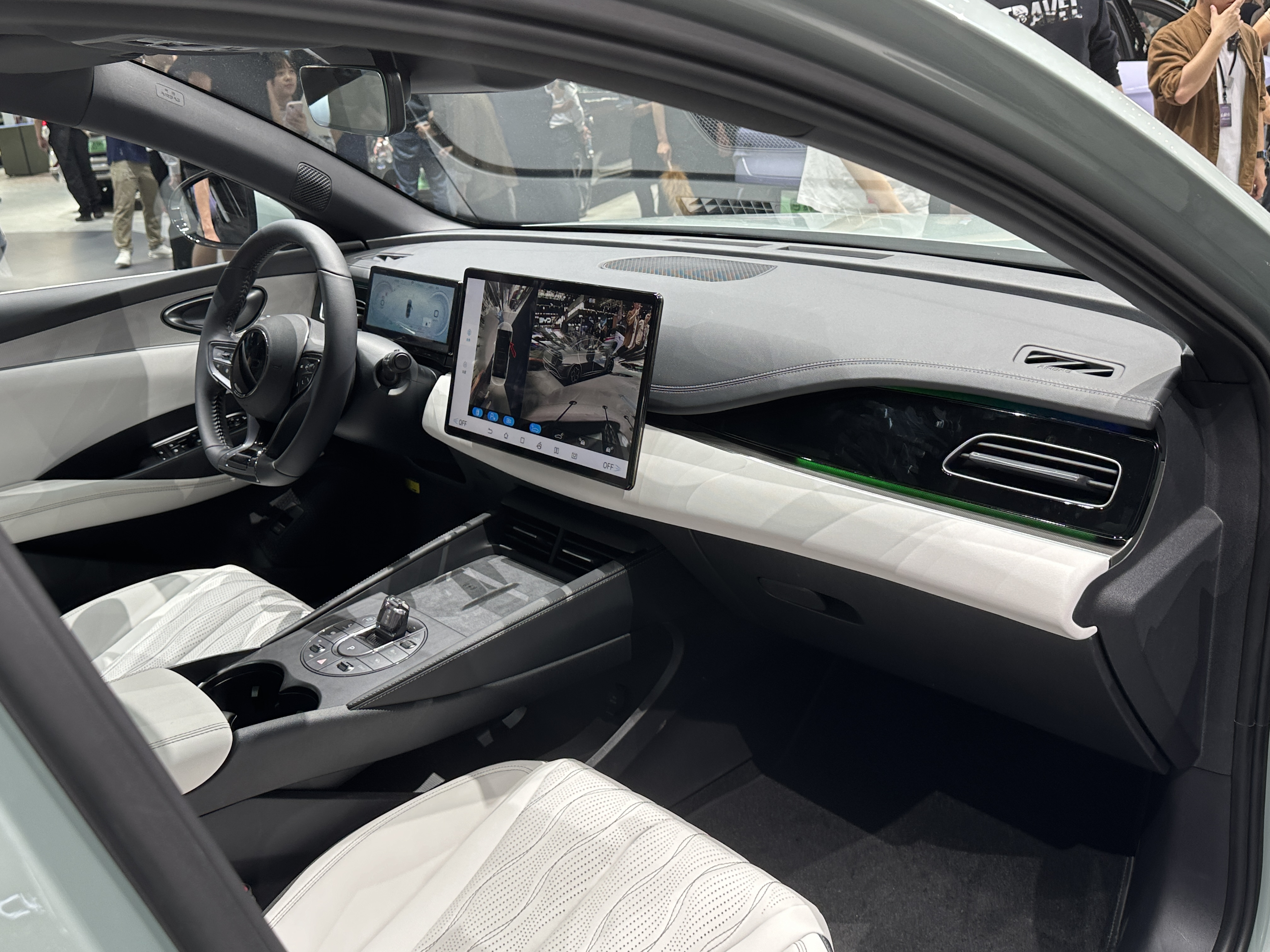
Interior

=== Exports ===
The Seal 06 DM-i is exported as the Seal 6 DM-i and Seal 6 DM-i Touring to Europe, Australia, New Zealand, and Singapore.

=== Powertrain ===
Type	Engine			Trans.	Battery	Layout	Electric motor			0–100 km/h (0–62 mph) (claimed)	Electric range (claimed)		Calendar years
Type	Displ.	Power	Torque	Trans.	Battery	Layout	Type	Power	Torque	0–100 km/h (0–62 mph) (claimed)	CLTC	WLTC	Calendar years
1.5L 80 km DM-i	BYD476QC 1,498 cc (1.5 L) I4	74 kW (99 hp)	126 N⋅m (12.8 kg⋅m; 92.9 lb⋅ft)	E-CVT	10.08 kWh LFP Blade battery	FWD	TZ210XYB PMSM	120 kW (161 hp)	210 N⋅m (21.4 kg⋅m; 155 lb⋅ft)	7.9 seconds	80 km (50 mi)	60 km (37 mi)	2024–present
1.5L 120 km DM-i	BYD476QC 1,498 cc (1.5 L) I4	74 kW (99 hp)	126 N⋅m (12.8 kg⋅m; 92.9 lb⋅ft)	E-CVT	15.87 kWh LFP Blade battery	FWD	TZ210XYC PMSM	160 kW (215 hp)	260 N⋅m (26.5 kg⋅m; 192 lb⋅ft)	7.5 seconds	120 km (75 mi)	90 km (56 mi)	2024–present

== Second generation (2025) ==
Second generation
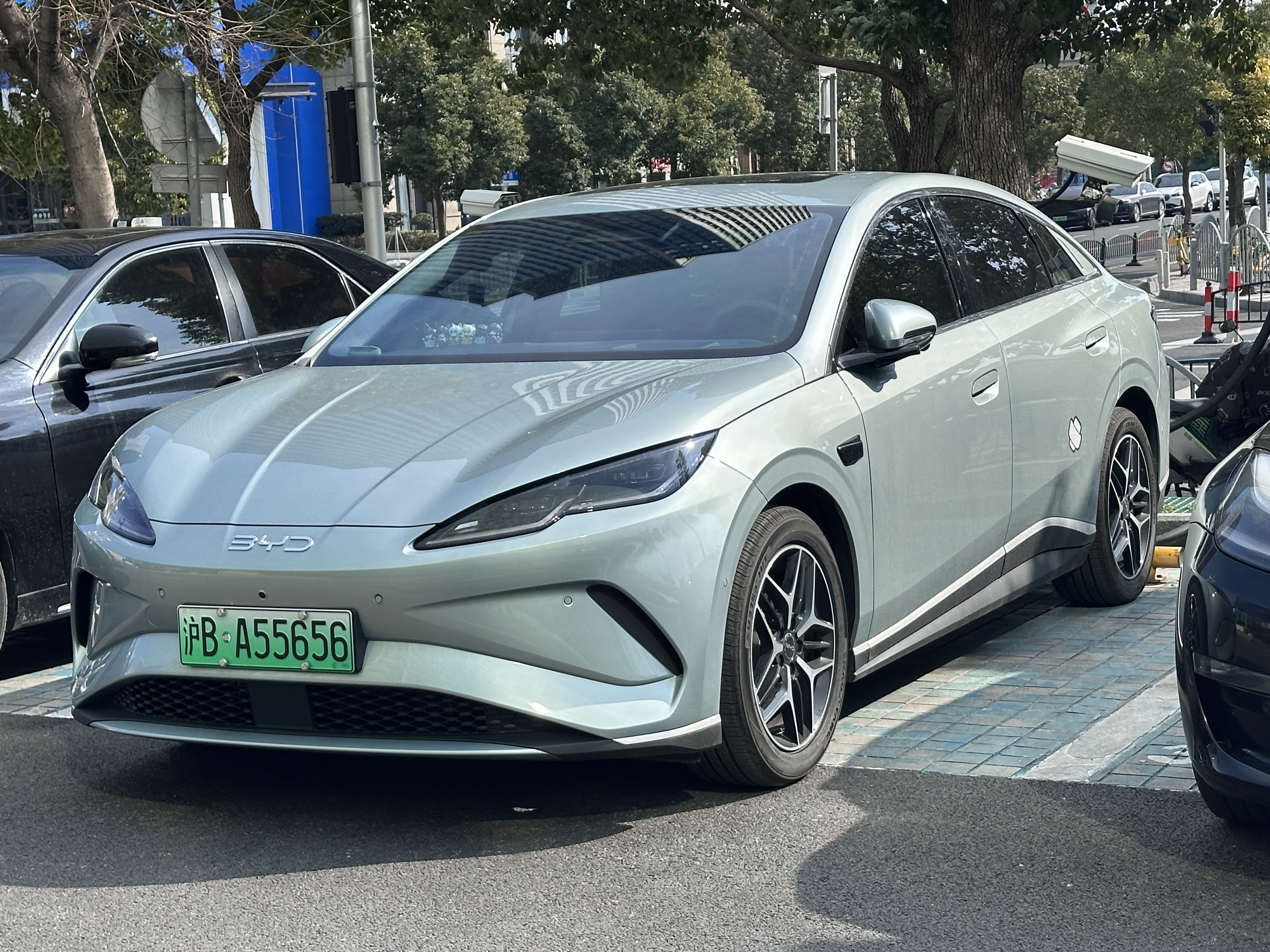

Overview
- Model code: EUH (DM-i); EUE (EV)
- Production: June 2025 – present
- Model years: 2025–present (EV); 2027–present (DM-i)
- Assembly: China
- Designer: Under the lead of Wolfgang Egger

Body and chassis
- Body style: 4-door sedan
- Layout: Rear-motor, rear-wheel-drive (EV); Front-engine, front-motor, front-wheel drive (DM-i)
- Platform: e-Platform 3.0 Evo
- Related: BYD Qin L EV; BYD Qin Max; BYD Sealion 05 EV

Powertrain
- Electric motor: Permanent magnet synchronous
- Power output: 110–160 kW (150–218 PS; 148–215 hp)
- Battery: 46.08 kWh BYD Blade LFP; 56.64 kWh BYD Blade LFP
- Electric range: 470–545 km (292–339 mi) (CLTC)

Dimensions
- Wheelbase: 2,820 mm (111.0 in)
- Length: 4,720 mm (185.8 in) (2025–2026); 4,870 mm (191.7 in) (2026–present)
- Width: 1,880 mm (74.0 in)
- Height: 1,495 mm (58.9 in)
- Curb weight: 1,670–1,800 kg (3,682–3,968 lb)

The Seal 06 EV was introduced in April 2025 at the Auto Shanghai, initially solely as a battery electric (EV) model to complement the Seal 06 DM-i plug-in hybrid. A sister model of the Dynasty Series BYD Qin L EV, the model is built on the e-Platform 3.0 Evo electric vehicle platform with a rear-wheel-drive layout.

The Seal 06 EV went on sale on 7 June 2025 with three variants.

=== Design and equipment ===
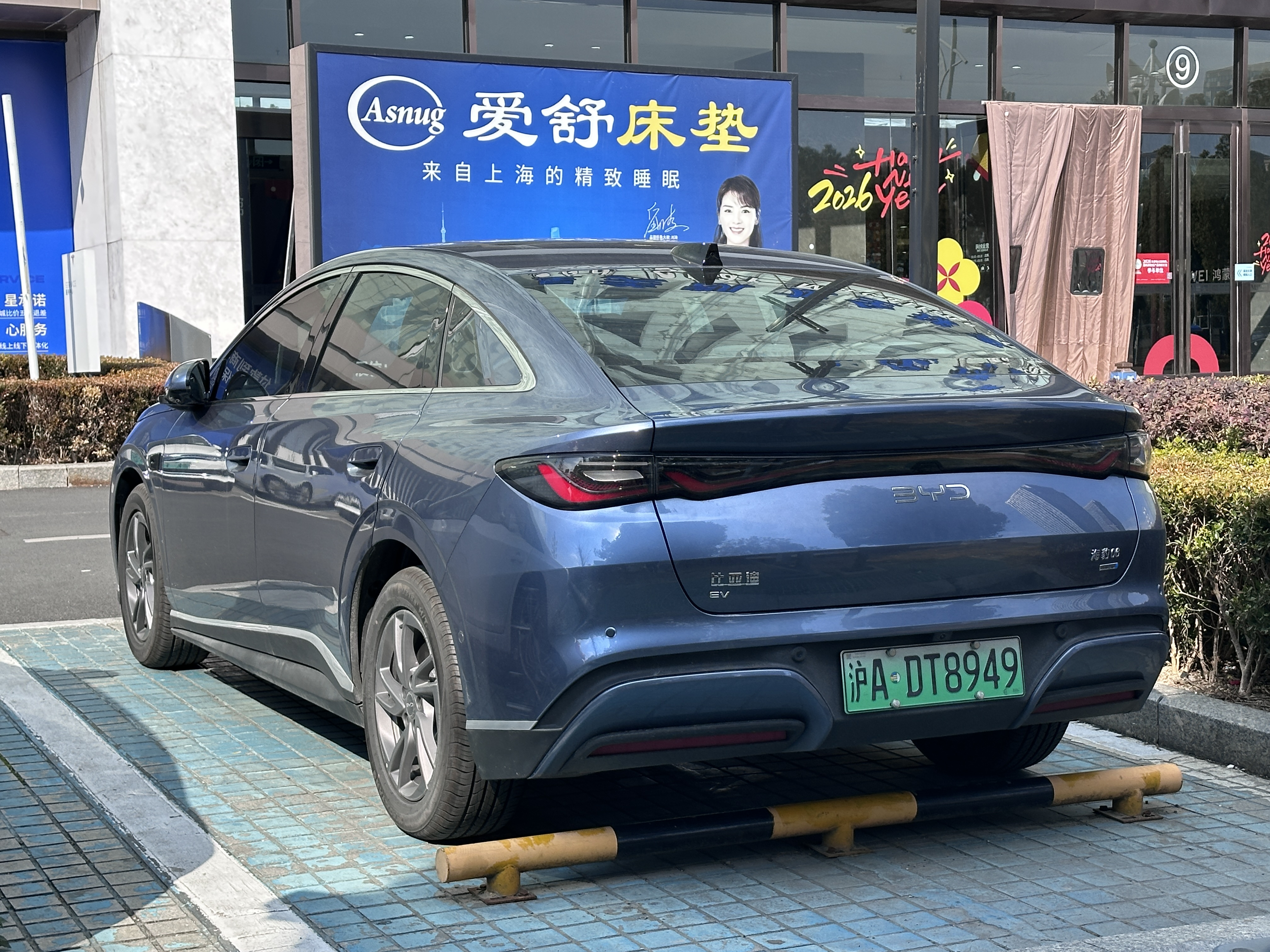
2025 Seal 06 EV (rear view)

The Seal 06 EV is based on the e-Platform 3.0 Evo platform, shared with the Qin L EV.

The exterior of the Seal 06 EV adopts BYD's Ocean Aesthetics design language. It features a closed front fascia paired with a lower trapezoidal grille, sharp LED headlights, flushed door handles, and a through-type continuous taillight bar with the Chinese knotting pattern.

Inside, the Seal 06 EV features a small LCD instrument panel and a rotatable 15.6-inch touchscreen which is powered by the DiPlink 100 infotainment system. The gear shifter with the BYD inscription on it used for the automatic transmission, is mounted behind the steering wheel. There are a pair of cupholders and two wireless charging pads in the centre console, and 24 storage spaces inside the cabin. The Seal 06 EV has a boot space of 423 L (14.9 cu ft) with the rear seats in place, and a 65 L (2.3 cu ft) frunk storage.

For safety, the Seal 06 EV is equipped with the God's Eye C (DiPilot 100) driving assistance system, it is powered by three cameras mounted on the front windscreen, and there are also cameras added to the front fenders and rear roof spoiler. The system is capable of functions such as Autonomous Emergency Braking (AEB) which operates at speeds up to 80 km/h (50 mph), Navigate On Autopilot (NOA) on autonomous parking and highways, and the system will also warn the driver in event of a side collision.

For suspension, MacPherson struts for the front and a five-link independent setup for the rear.

=== Facelift and DM-i ===
The BYD Seal 06 EV and BYD Seal 06 DM-i both received an update for the 2027 model year, with both cars now sharing the same exterior body, making the 2027 Seal 06 DM-i a complete new generation while the EV is merely a facelift. It features a slightly differentiated front and rear fascia, and a more powerful 240 kW (320 hp) rear motor. At the same time, its body has been significantly lengthened by 150 mm (5.9 in), aligning with its sister model, which has been reworked from the Qin L EV to the Qin Max. Like the Qin Max, it is available with a 52.87 or 64.31 kWh LFP BYD Blade battery which have CLTC range ratings of 530 and 630 km (329 and 391 mi) respectively.

BYD Seal 06 EV MY2027 facelift

Rear view

== Sales ==
Year	China	
Year	DM-i	EV
2024	193,631	
2025	165,845	54,472

== See also ==
- List of BYD Auto vehicles
