= BYD Seal 6 DM-i =

Plug-in hybrid mid-size car

- BYD Seal 6 DM-i sedan

Overview
- Manufacturer: BYD Auto
- Also called: BYD Seal 06 DM-i (China)
- Production: April 2024 – present
- Assembly: China: Changsha, Hunan; Hefei, Anhui; Zhengzhou, Henan; Jinan, Shandong
- Designer: Under the lead of Wolfgang Egger

Body and chassis
- Class: Mid-size car (D-segment)
- Body style: 4-door sedan; 5-door station wagon
- Layout: Front-engine, front-motor, front-wheel drive
- Platform: DM-i 5.0 platform
- Related: BYD Qin L DM-i

Powertrain
- Engine: Petrol plug-in hybrid: 1.5 L BYD472QC I4 Atkinson cycle
- Electric motor: Permanent magnet synchronous
- Transmission: E-CVT
- Hybrid drivetrain: Plug-in hybrid
- Battery: 10.08 kWh BYD Blade LFP; 15.87 kWh BYD Blade LFP

Dimensions
- Wheelbase: 2,790 mm (109.8 in)
- Length: 4,830 mm (190.2 in) (sedan); 4,850 mm (190.9 in) (wagon)
- Width: 1,875 mm (73.8 in) (sedan); 1,890 mm (74.4 in) (wagon)
- Height: 1,495 mm (58.9 in) (sedan); 1,505 mm (59.3 in) (wagon)
- Curb weight: 1,660–1,775 kg (3,660–3,913 lb)

Chronology
- Successor: BYD Seal 06 DM-i (second generation) (China)

The BYD Seal 6 DM-i is a plug-in hybrid mid-size car manufactured by BYD Auto since 2024, originally marketed in China as the BYD Seal 06 DM-i (Chinese: 比亚迪海豹06DM-i; pinyin: Bǐyǎdí Hǎibào 06 DM-i. It is available as a sedan and station wagon.

== History ==
The Seal 06 DM-i debuted at the 2024 Beijing Auto Show in April, and launched in China on 28 May 2024. It shares BYD's fifth-generation plug-in hybrid system marketed as DM-i 5.0 with the Qin L from the 'Dynasty Series'.

== Design and equipment ==
The exterior of the Seal 6 DM-i adopts the design language from the BYD Ocean vehicle series. It features a closed front fascia, door handles of an outward-flip design, a transparent taillight bar and an illuminated BYD logo on the rear boot lid. For the suspension, the Seal 6 DM-i has MacPherson struts at the front and a E-type four-link independent setup at the rear.

Inside, the Seal 6 DM-i carries over the Ocean series design for the dashboard and doors. There is a 8.8-inch LCD digital instrument cluster and a rotatable 15.6-inch central touchscreen infotainment system.

The station wagon model was unveiled in April 2025 at the Shanghai Auto Show, and was launched in China on 4 July 2025. The station wagon has a maximum boot capacity of 1,535 L (54.2 cu ft) when the rear seats are folded down.

Rear view

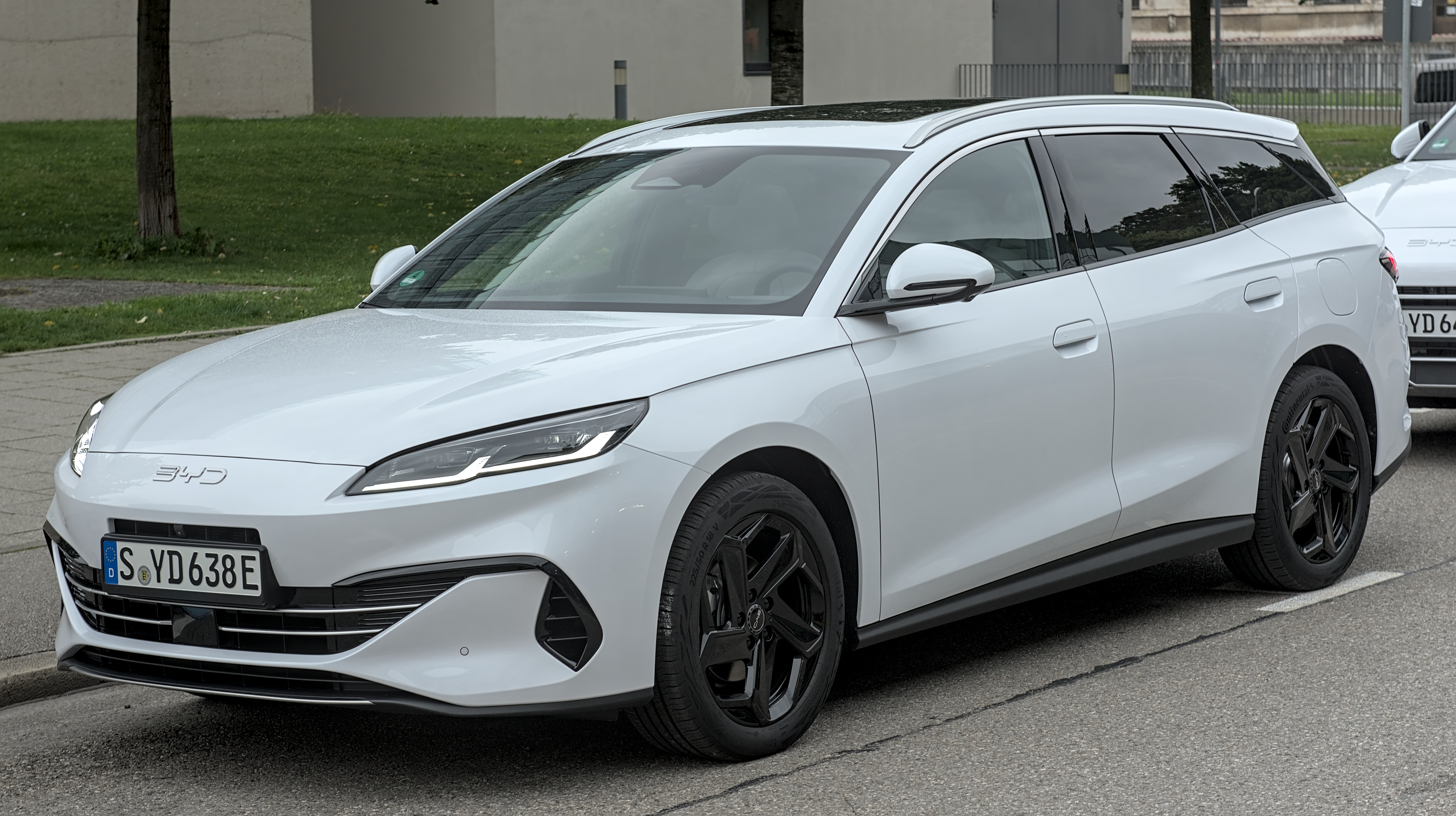
BYD Seal 6 DM-i Touring

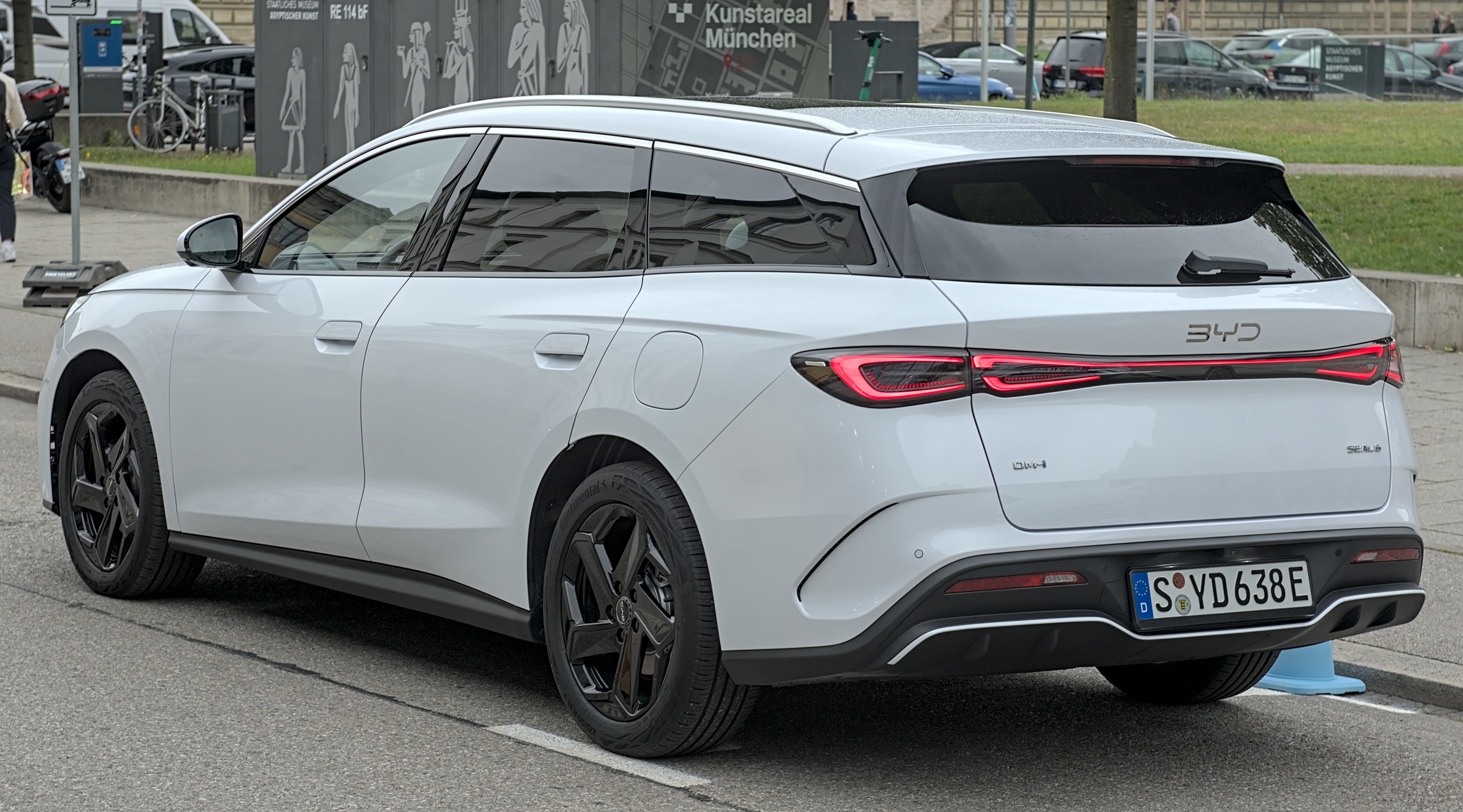
Rear view

Interior

== Markets ==
=== Europe ===
The Seal 6 DM-i saloon and Touring models made its European debut at the IAA Mobility 2025, with sales commenced in late 2025. In Europe, it is available with three trim levels: Boost, Comfort Lite and Comfort, available with 10 and 19 kWh battery capacities.

=== Oceania ===
==== Australia ====
The Seal 6 DM-i went on sale in Australia on 9 April 2026, in both saloon and Touring bodystyles. The saloon is available in the sole Essential (10 kWh) variant, while the Touring is available in the sole Premium (19 kWh variant). At the time of its introduction, the Seal 6 DM-i was the cheapest plug-in hybrid saloon and station wagon models on sale in Australia, and the Touring model was the cheapest station wagon on sale in the country.

==== New Zealand ====
The Seal 6 DM-i Touring was launched in New Zealand on 16 April 2026, in the sole Premium (19 kWh) variant.

=== Southeast Asia ===
The Seal 6 DM-i was launched in Singapore on 8 May 2026, in both saloon and Touring bodystyles. The saloon is available with Dynamic (10 kWh) and Premium (19 kWh) variants, while the Touring is available in the sole Dynamic (10 kWh) variant.

== Powertrain ==
Type	Engine			Trans.	Battery	Layout	Electric motor			0–100 km/h (0–62 mph) (claimed)	Electric range (claimed)		Calendar years
Type	Displ.	Power	Torque	Trans.	Battery	Layout	Type	Power	Torque	0–100 km/h (0–62 mph) (claimed)	CLTC	WLTC	Calendar years
1.5L 80 km DM-i	BYD476QC 1,498 cc (1.5 L) I4	74 kW (99 hp)	126 N⋅m (12.8 kg⋅m; 92.9 lb⋅ft)	E-CVT	10.08 kWh LFP Blade battery	FWD	TZ210XYB PMSM	120 kW (161 hp)	210 N⋅m (21.4 kg⋅m; 155 lb⋅ft)	7.9 seconds	80 km (50 mi)	60 km (37 mi)	2024–present
1.5L 120 km DM-i	BYD476QC 1,498 cc (1.5 L) I4	74 kW (99 hp)	126 N⋅m (12.8 kg⋅m; 92.9 lb⋅ft)	E-CVT	15.87 kWh LFP Blade battery	FWD	TZ210XYC PMSM	160 kW (215 hp)	260 N⋅m (26.5 kg⋅m; 192 lb⋅ft)	7.5 seconds	120 km (75 mi)	90 km (56 mi)	2024–present

== Safety ==
Euro NCAP test results BYD Seal 6 'Comfort Lite', (LHD) (2025)
Test	Points	%
Overall:	5 /5 stars	
Adult occupant:	36.9	92%
Child occupant:	44.5	90%
Pedestrian:	53.1	84%
Safety assist:	15.5	85%

== Sales ==
Year	China
2024	193,631
2025	165,845

== See also ==
- List of BYD Auto vehicles
