= China Light-Duty Vehicle Test Cycle =

Driving cycle standard

The China Light-Duty Vehicle Test Cycle (CLTC) (Chinese: 中国轻型汽车行驶工况; pinyin: Zhōngguó qīngxíng qìchē xíngshǐ gōng kuàng) is a driving cycle standard introduced by the government of China to measure the energy consumption, driving range and emissions of light-duty vehicles, including both internal combustion engine (ICE) vehicles and electric vehicles (EV). It was developed with a goal to align vehicle testing with Chinese real-world driving conditions, and to replace the New European Driving Cycle (NEDC) in China.

The CLTC was first adopted into regulation by the Chinese Ministry of Industry and Information Technology (MIIT) in October 2021 under the national standard "GB/T 38146.1-2019, China Automotive Test Cycle Part 1: Light Vehicles". It allows the manufacturer of battery electric vehicles to report all-electric range and energy consumption based on either the New European Driving Cycle (NEDC) or CLTC.

The CLTC testing accounts for the country's higher congestion levels with more frequent stop-and-go and lower speed limits, which lead to increased low-speed driving and longer idling times that benefits electric vehicles.

As of 2024, the CLTC standard is used in China alongside the NEDC and the Worldwide Harmonised Light Vehicles Test Cycle (WLTC). Outside China, the CLTC has drawn criticism for being perceived as less rigorous than other standards such as the WLTP and EPA in electric vehicle range estimates.

== History ==
In 2009, the Worldwide Harmonized Light-Duty Driving Test Cycle (WLTC) was introduced in 2009 by the Working Party on Pollution and Energy Transport Program (GRPE) under the United Nations Economic Commission for Europe (UNECE). It was based on real driving data from six regions: the US, South Korea, Japan, India, the EU, and Switzerland. However, the WLTC did not include data from China, limiting its applicability in reflecting Chinese driving conditions. In response, in 2015 the Ministry of Industry and Information Technology (MIIT) started the China Automotive Test Cycle (CATC) project at a cost of more than 100 million RMB, with the aim of creating a more representative driving cycle for China, addressing the limitations of existing driving cycles such as the NEDC, which did not accurately reflect real driving conditions in China. Initially, the NEDC was used for vehicle type approval tests (homologation) in China, but as vehicle ownership and traffic patterns evolved, the gap between test results and actual fuel consumption increased. The China Automotive Technology & Research Center (CATARC) took the lead in organizing the joint research, which also involved the Ministry of Finance, the Ministry of Environmental Protection, the National Standards Committee and the Chinese Academy of Engineering.

To develop the CLTC, extensive data was collected from over 3,700 light-duty vehicles across 40 cities in China, considering various factors such as traffic volume and road conditions. The resulting driving cycle is designed to capture typical urban and rural driving behaviors. Its effectiveness was evaluated by comparing its characteristics with those of other driving cycles, including the NEDC, FTP-75, and the WLTC. The CLTC has longer transient cycles and higher idle ratios, which more closely reflect congested traffic conditions in Chinese cities. Fuel consumption analyses showed that the CLTC's rates are approximately 13.5% higher than results from testing during vehicle homologation in China.

On October 1, 2021, the MIIT issued the "Notice on Matters Related to the Calculation of Double Credits in 2021". This notice mandates that battery electric passenger vehicles have the option to state their power consumption and driving range based on either the NEDC or the CLTC. Meanwhile, internal combustion vehicles and plug-in hybrid passenger vehicles must state their fuel consumption, power consumption, and electric driving range according to the WLTC. Additionally, the national standard "Passenger Car Fuel Consumption Limit" (GB 19578-2021) issued in February 2021, states that by 2025, the test conditions for internal combustion passenger cars and plug-in hybrid passenger cars will transition from the NEDC to the WLTC.

The standard was quickly adopted by manufacturers. On 8 October 2021, Tesla China updated the range for its Model 3 Performance on its official website, increasing it from 605 km (376 mi) to 675 km (419 mi). This change coincided with the new battery capacity of 78.4 kWh, which is only 1.6 kWh larger than the previous model's 76.8 kWh. The improvement in range was attributed to the transition from the NEDC to the CLTC.

== Category ==
The CLTC is standardized by the national standard "GB/T 38146.1-2019, China Automotive Test Cycle Part 1: Light Vehicles", which defines two chassis dynamometer driving cycles, one for passenger cars and another for light commercial vehicles:

- CLTC-P: China light-duty vehicle test cycle-passenger cars (乘用车行驶工况)
- CLTC-C: China light-duty vehicle test cycle-commercial vehicles (轻型商用车行驶工况)

The China Automotive Test Cycle also includes the China Heavy-Duty Vehicle Test Cycle, consisting of CHTC-B, CHTC-C, CHTC-D, CHTC-LT, CHTC-HT, and CHTC-TT.

== Test procedure ==
The CLTC is designed to simulate typical urban and rural driving conditions in China. Chinese cities generally experience higher congestion levels, leading to a greater proportion of low-speed driving, frequent stops and longer idling times. The maximum speed limit in China is set at 120 km/h (75 mph). The CLTC testing includes lower average speeds, frequent stops, and more dynamic driving profiles, which is claimed to more closely reflect the realities of China's traffic patterns compared to the NEDC or the Worldwide Harmonised Light Vehicles Test Procedure (WLTP). This standard benefits electric vehicles, which under this cycle are able to produce higher driving range numbers compared to the NEDC and WLTP.

The CLTC testing involves three driving phases: slow, medium, and fast, with a total duration of 30 minutes and a vehicle mileage of 14.48 km (9.00 mi) on a dynamometer. It is based on a study of 3,832 vehicles from 41 cities, incorporating low-frequency dynamic data that reflects typical traffic conditions in China. Compared to the WLTP adopted in Europe, the CLTC involves more frequent stops, accelerations, decelerations, and simulates urban traffic congestion with a lower speed limit of 114 km/h (71 mph). The extra-high-speed condition from the WLTP has been removed, but the total cycle duration remains unchanged at 1,800 seconds. The idling time of the CLTC testing accounted for 22.1% of the entire cycle time, which is close to the idling duration of the NEDC testing.

Parameters	CLTC-P	CLTC-C
Cycle duration (s)	1,800	1,800
Total distance (km)	14.48	16.43
Max. speed (km/h)	114	92
Average speed (km/h)	28.96	32.87
Average speed of operation (km/h)	37.18	41.25
Max. acceleration (m/s²)	1.47	1.36
Max. deceleration (m/s²)	-1.47	-1.39
Average acceleration (m/s²)	0.45	0.47
Average deceleration (m/s²)	-0.49	-0.48

== Comparison with other driving cycles ==
The following table presents a comparison of test results conducted by the Tianjin Automotive Research Institute of a sampled electric vehicle prior to the introduction of the CLTC.

	CLTC	NEDC	WLTP	EPA
Range	509 km (316 mi)	484 km (301 mi)	398 km (247 mi)	390 km (242 mi)
Power consumption	12.8 kWh/100 km (7.8 km/kWh)	13.8 kWh/100 km (7.2 km/kWh)	16.8 kWh/100 km (6.0 km/kWh)	17.1 kWh/100 km (5.8 km/kWh)

The following table is a comparison of the test cycle of CLTC-P compared to other test cycles.

Parameter	CLTC-P	NEDC	WLTC	FTP-75
Cycle duration (s)	1,800	1,180	1,800	1,874
Total distance (km)	14.48	11.03	23.21	17.68
Max. speed (km/h)	114	120.00	131.30	90.16
Average speed (km/h)	28.96	33.60	46.42	33.90
Average speed of operation (km/h)	37.18	43.50	53.20	40.90
Max. acceleration (m/s²)	1.47	1.04	1.58	1.57
Max. deceleration (m/s²)	-1.47	-1.39	-1.49	-1.57
Average acceleration (m/s²)	0.45	0.53	0.53	0.62
Average deceleration (m/s²)	-0.49	-0.75	-0.58	-0.71
Acceleration ratio (%)	28.61	23.20	30.90	31.10
Deceleration ratio (%)	26.44	16.60	28.60	27.10
Cruise ratio (%)	22.83	37.50	27.80	24.70
Idling ratio (%)	22.11	22.60	12.70	17.20

== Limitation and criticism ==
The CLTC has some limitations, such as how it accounts for energy consumption from air conditioning or in-car entertainment systems during testing. During hot or cold weather, electric vehicles need extra energy for air conditioning, which reduces their driving range. Additionally, using entertainment systems may further increase energy consumption, affecting the overall range.

The CLTC has also faced criticism internationally for being perceived as "less stringent", "generous", or "unrealistic" compared to the WLTP and EPA standards when measuring electric vehicle range. Critics argue that the CLTC may overestimate vehicle range compared to these other testing protocols, which are widely regarded as more rigorous in assessing real-world driving conditions.

== See also ==
- New European Driving Cycle
- Worldwide Harmonised Light Vehicles Test Procedure (WLTP)
- FTP-75
