= BYD e5 =

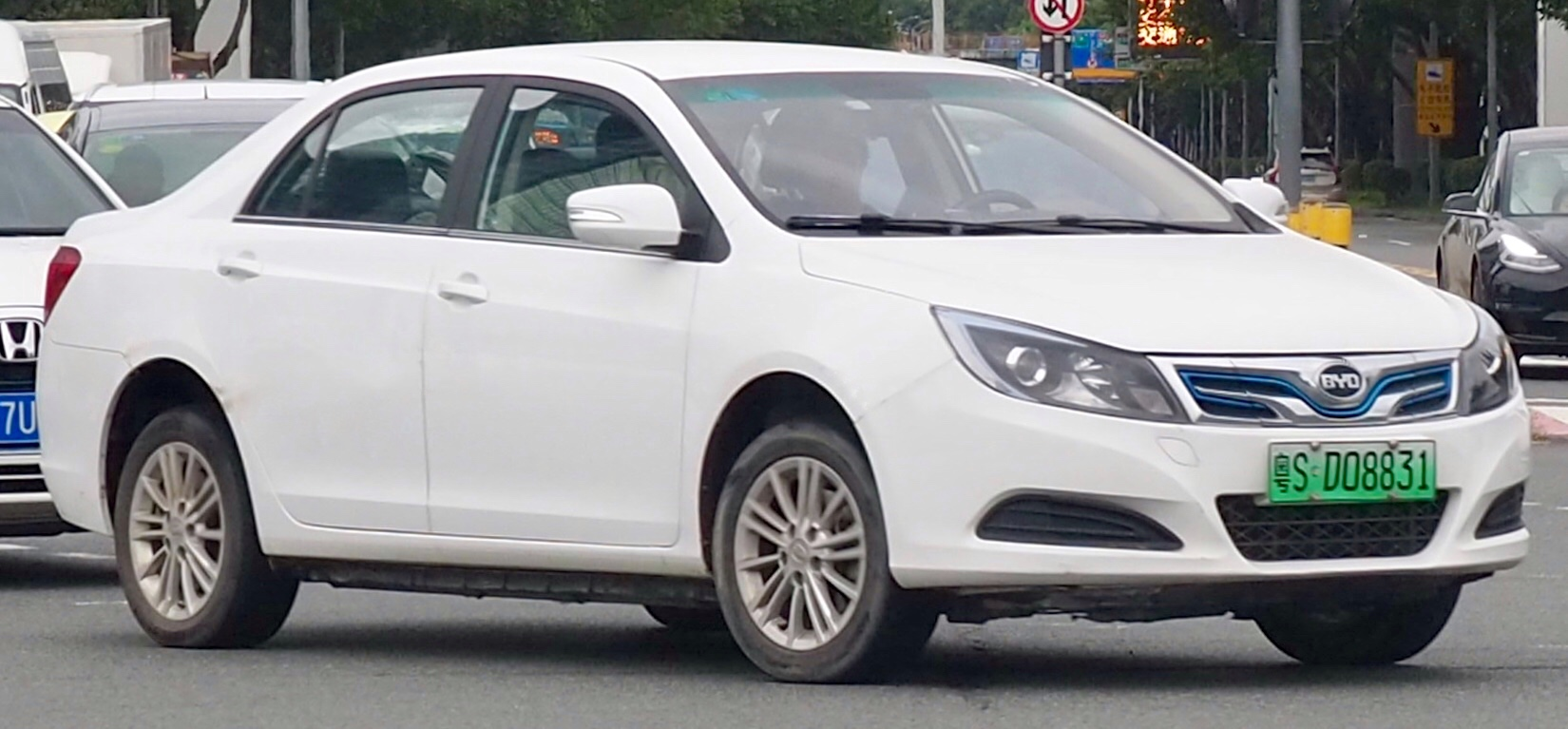

Overview
- Manufacturer: BYD
- Production: 2015–2020
- Model years: 2016–2020

Body and chassis
- Class: Compact car (C-segment)
- Body style: 4-door sedan
- Layout: Front-motor, front-wheel-drive
- Related: BYD L3; BYD F3; BYD F3DM; BYD Qin; BYD G3

Powertrain
- Electric motor: Single Permanent-magnet Electric motor 160 kW (210 hp)
- Transmission: Electric Automatic
- Battery: 65 Ah lithium iron phosphate battery (LiFePO_{4}),

Dimensions
- Wheelbase: 2,660 mm (104.7 in)
- Length: 4,680 mm (184.3 in)
- Width: 1,765 mm (69.5 in)
- Height: 1,500 mm (59.1 in)
- Curb weight: 1,210 kg (2,668 lb)

Chronology
- Successor: BYD Qin EV

The BYD e5 is a compact all-electric car manufactured by BYD, based on the gasoline-powered BYD Surui sedan, an internal combustion engine (ICE) car that had been introduced in 2012.

== Specifications ==
The e5 featured a 65Ah lithium iron phosphate battery (LiFePO_{4}), capable of delivering an all-electric range of 220 km (137 mi), and a top speed of 150 km/h (93 mph). Retail sales began in China in September 2015. 1,426 units were delivered in the Chinese market in 2015, and 15,639 in 2016. 17,065 units were sold in China through December 2016.

A 300-km-range version called BYD e5 300, which shares many characteristics with the BYD Qin EV300, was launched in 2016.

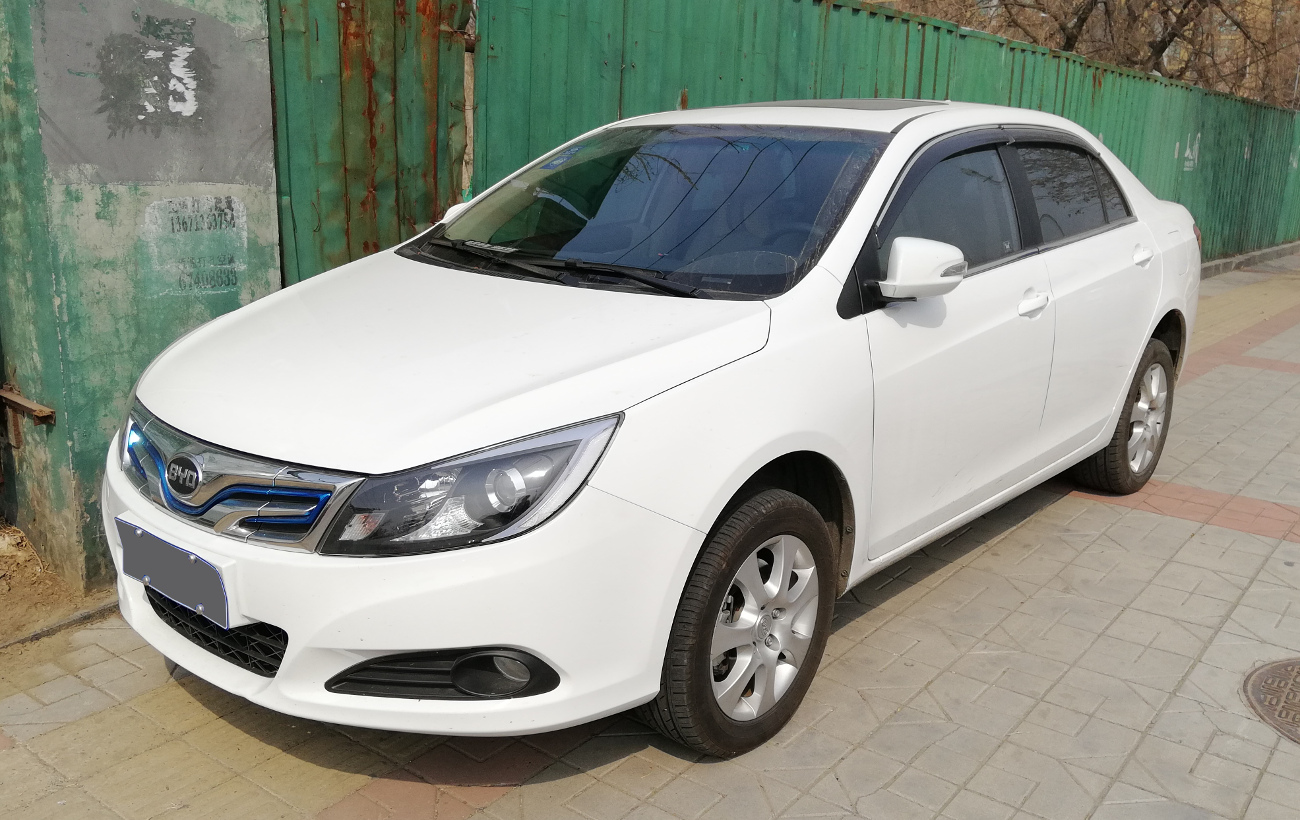
Front view

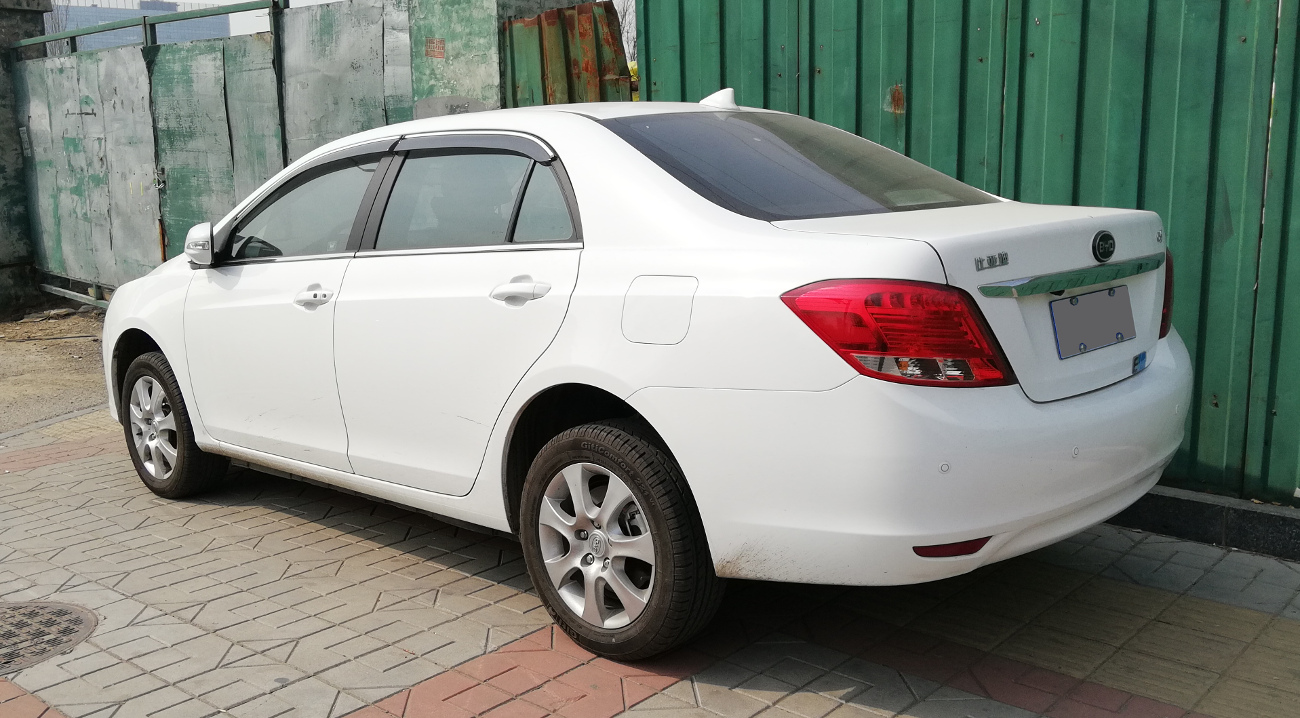
Rear view

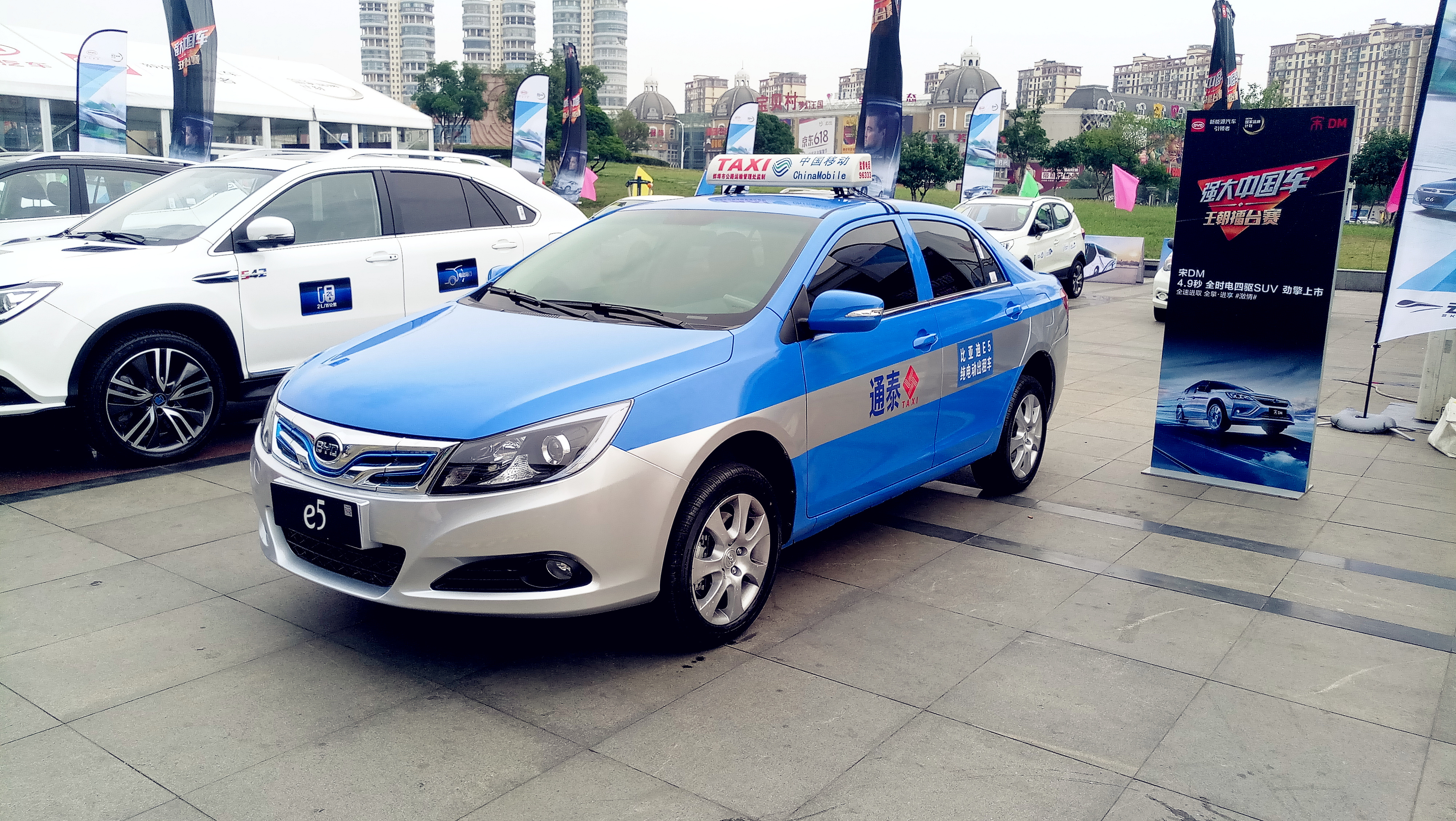
BYD e5 Electric Taxicab in Bengbu

== Exports ==
Government incentives for electric vehicles has led to the BYD e5 being exported to several Latin American countries for use as taxis, including Santiago, in Chile. In Guayaquil, the capital city of Ecuador, it is currently the most popular model of electric vehicle used for taxis, but a lack of charging infrastructure has been a barrier to wider adoption.

== See also ==
- BYD e1
- BYD e6
- BYD F3DM
- BYD F6DM
