= BYD S8 =

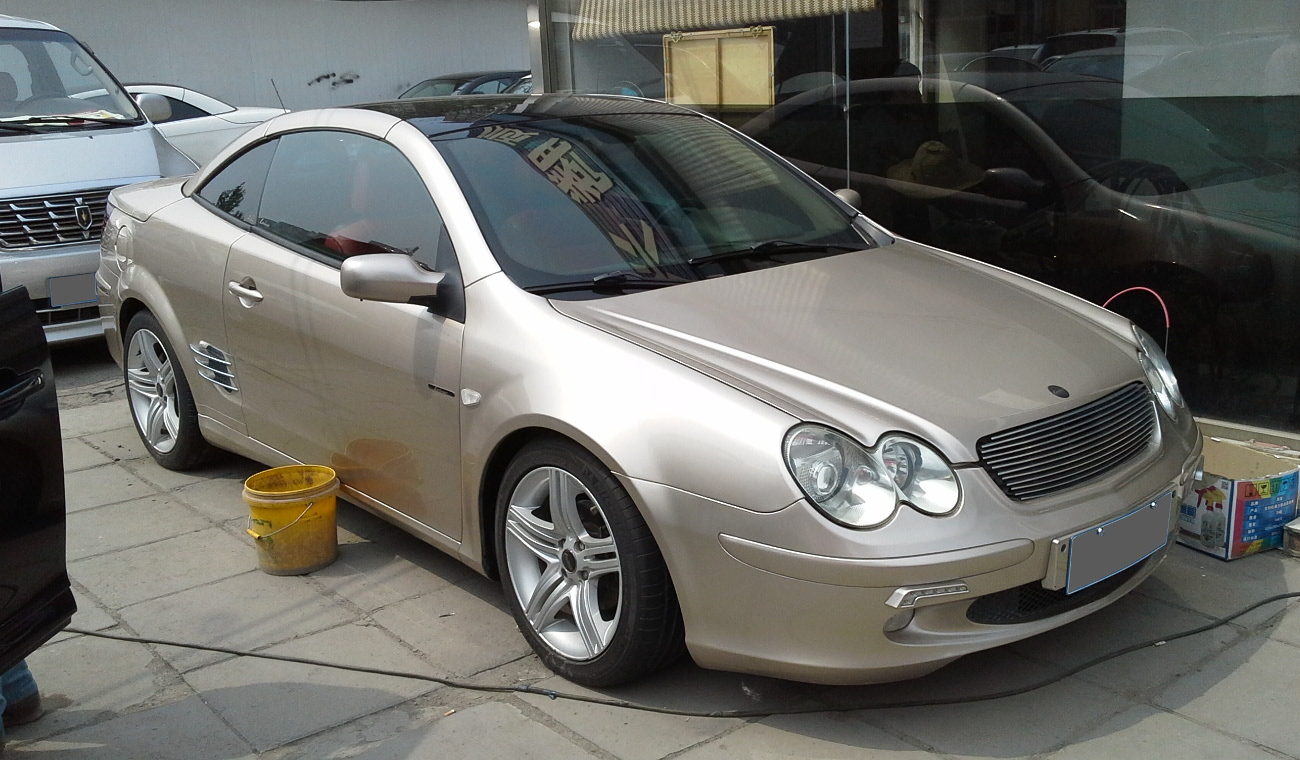

Overview
- Manufacturer: BYD
- Also called: BYD F8
- Production: 2009–2010; 103 produced

Body and chassis
- Class: Sports car (S)
- Body style: 2-door convertible
- Layout: Front-engine, front-wheel-drive
- Related: BYD F3

Powertrain
- Engine: 2.0 L BYD483QB I4 (petrol)
- Transmission: 5 speed manual CVT

Dimensions
- Wheelbase: 2,520 mm (99.2 in)
- Length: 4,490 mm (176.8 in)
- Width: 1,780 mm (70.1 in)
- Height: 1,405 mm (55.3 in)
- Curb weight: 1,525–1,550 kg (3,362–3,417 lb)

The BYD S8 is a convertible sports car manufactured by the Chinese car company BYD. First shown as a prototype at the Shanghai Motor Show in 2006 as the F8.

== Overview ==
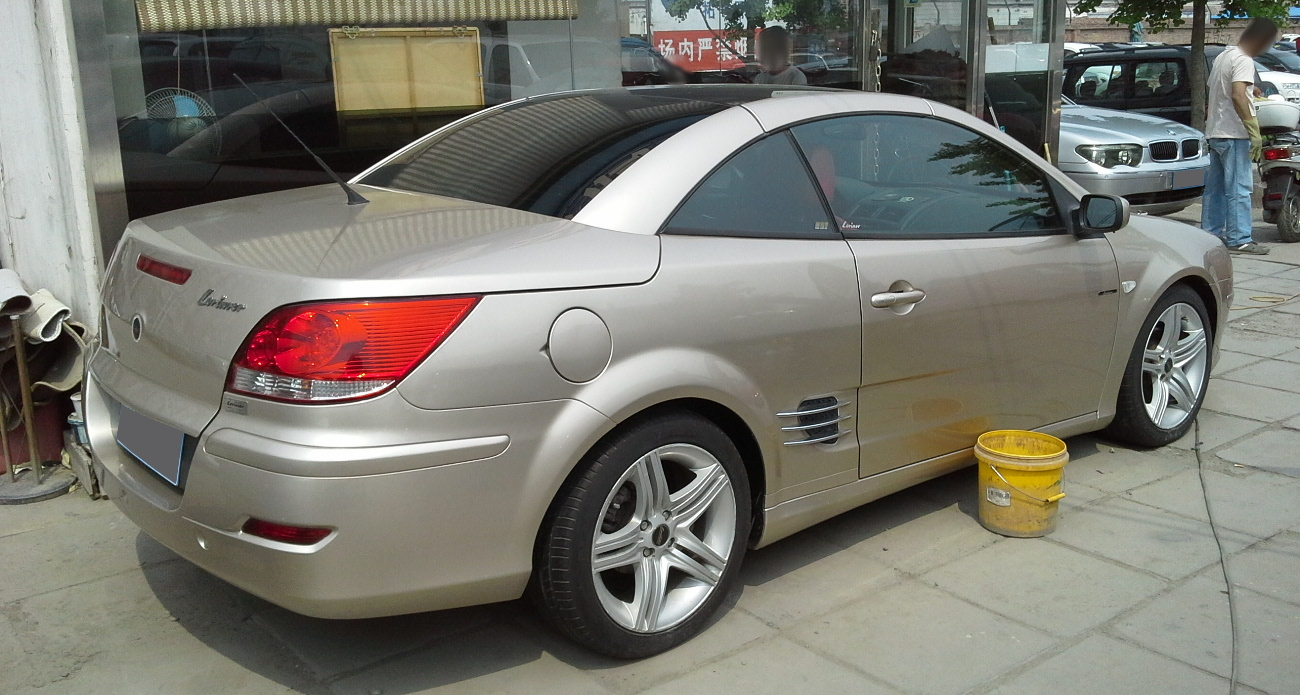
BYD S8 rear

The vehicle has a steel roof and the design shares similarities at the rear with the conceptually similar Renault Mégane CC while the front is reminiscent of the Mercedes-Benz CLK.

The BYD S8 is front-wheel drive and is powered by a 4-cylinder 2.0-litre engine. The S8 was mainly sold in China.

== Sales ==
In 2009 the car sold in 96 units, and only seven cars were sold in the full 2010 fiscal year. Production has now ceased. In all, the car sold in only 103 units.
