= BYD F3DM =

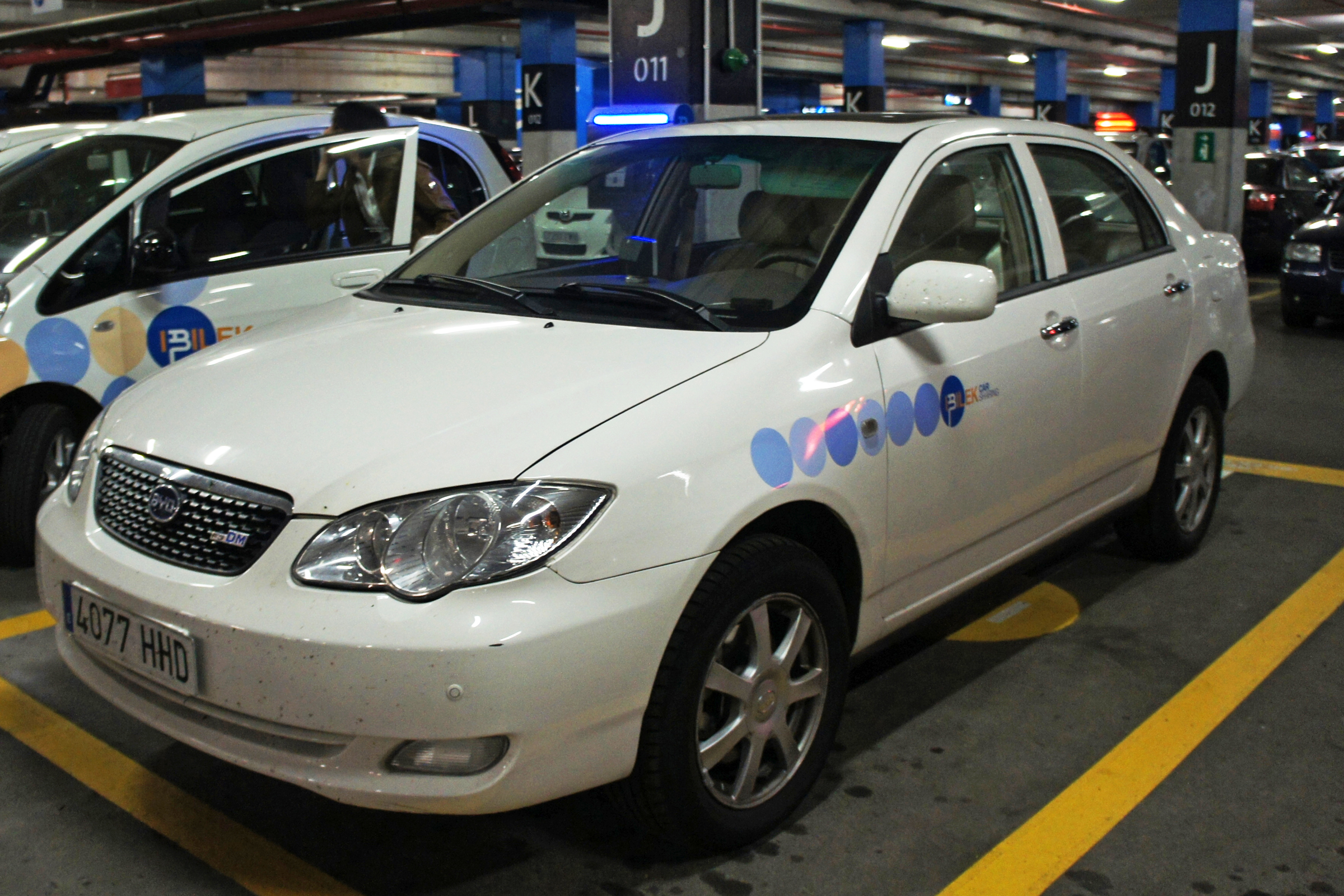

Overview
- Manufacturer: BYD
- Production: 2008–2013

Body and chassis
- Class: Plug-in hybrid sedan
- Body style: Sedan
- Related: BYD F3; BYD G3; BYD L3

Powertrain
- Engine: 1.0 L BYD371QA I3 Aluminum Engine
- Electric motor: Two permanent-magnet Synchronous Electric Motors, 25 kW (34 hp) and 50 kW (67 hp)
- Transmission: Electric Automatic
- Hybrid drivetrain: PHEV
- Battery: 16 kWh LiFePO_{4} battery pack
- Range: 480 km (300 mi)
- Electric range: 60 km (37 mi)

Dimensions
- Wheelbase: 2,600 mm (102.4 in)
- Length: 4,533 mm (178.5 in)
- Width: 1,705 mm (67.1 in)
- Height: 1,520 mm (59.8 in)
- Curb weight: 1,560 kg (3,439 lb)

Chronology
- Successor: BYD Qin

The BYD F3DM (Dual-mode) is a plug-in hybrid compact sedan manufactured by BYD with an all-electric range of 60 kilometres (37 mi) and a hybrid electric powertrain that can extend the range an additional 480 kilometres (300 mi). The F3DM is the world's first mass-produced plug-in hybrid automobile and went on sale to government agencies and corporations in China on December 15, 2008. During its first year in the market the F3DM plug-in sold only 48 vehicles. Sales to the general public began in Shenzhen in March 2010, and 417 units were sold during 2010. Cumulative sales in China reached 3,284 units through October 2013, when sales ended, and only 11 units were sold in Europe through October 2012.

A testing program was launched in the U.S. in December 2010 with the participation of the Housing Authority of the City of Los Angeles (HACLA). The F3DM was expected to go on sale in the U.S. in 2012 at a price of US$28,800 before any government incentives. In October 2011 BYD announced that retail sales will be delayed due to the lack of charging infrastructure.

In April 2012 BYD announced that due to its low sales, the F3DM was to be replaced by the BYD Qin (pronounced “Chin”) plug-in hybrid, which was unveiled at the 2012 Beijing International Automotive Exhibition. Qin deliveries in China began in mid December 2013. As of May 2013, the F3DM was no longer in production, but the remaining stock was sold by October 2013.

== History ==
The F3DM was introduced at the 2008 Geneva Motor Show, preceded by the F6DM concept car which was first unveiled in the North American International Auto Show in January 2008.

== Batteries and range ==
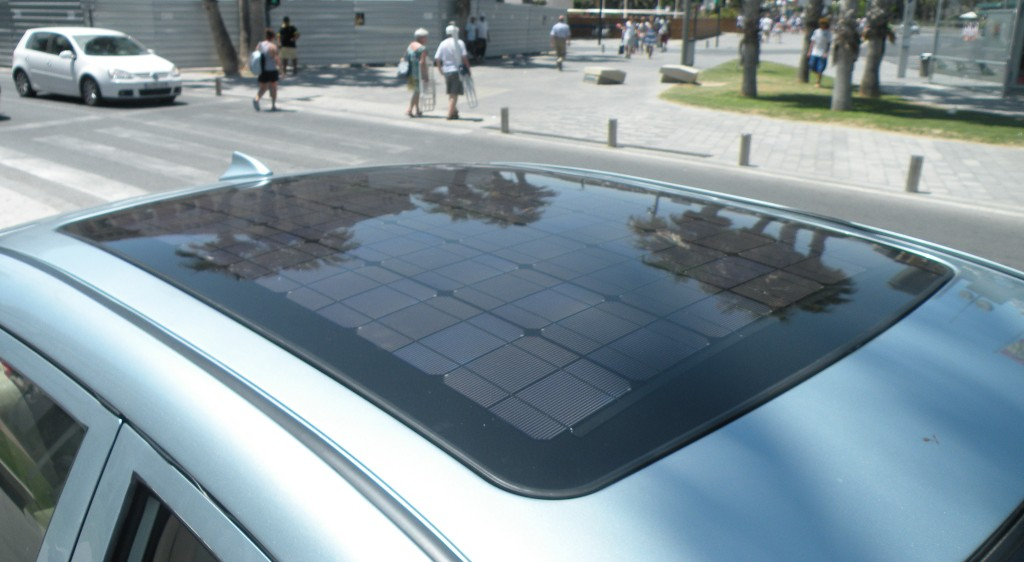
The F3DM's roof-mounted solar panels.

BYD uses a 16 kWh lithium iron phosphate batteries (LiFePO_{4}) for the F3DM. BYD has said their LiFePO_{4} batteries are "inherently safe" because they are more chemically stable, although they pack less energy in each cell (100 Wh/kg), compared with more conventional lithium-ion (LiCoO_{2}) batteries (150 to 200 Wh/kg). The F3DM battery pack consist of 100 3.3-volt cells stored under the cabin.

BYD says the car will have a 100 kilometres (60 mi) all-electric range as well as a gasoline engine that allows operation in hybrid mode that extend the range for an additional 480 kilometres (300 mi). The electric range assumes the car is traveling at a constant speed of 50 km/h, which is not likely to reflect real-world usage. The F3DM has a roof-mounted large solar panel capable of providing electric energy to run vehicle accessories such as the radio and climate control.

== Powertrain ==
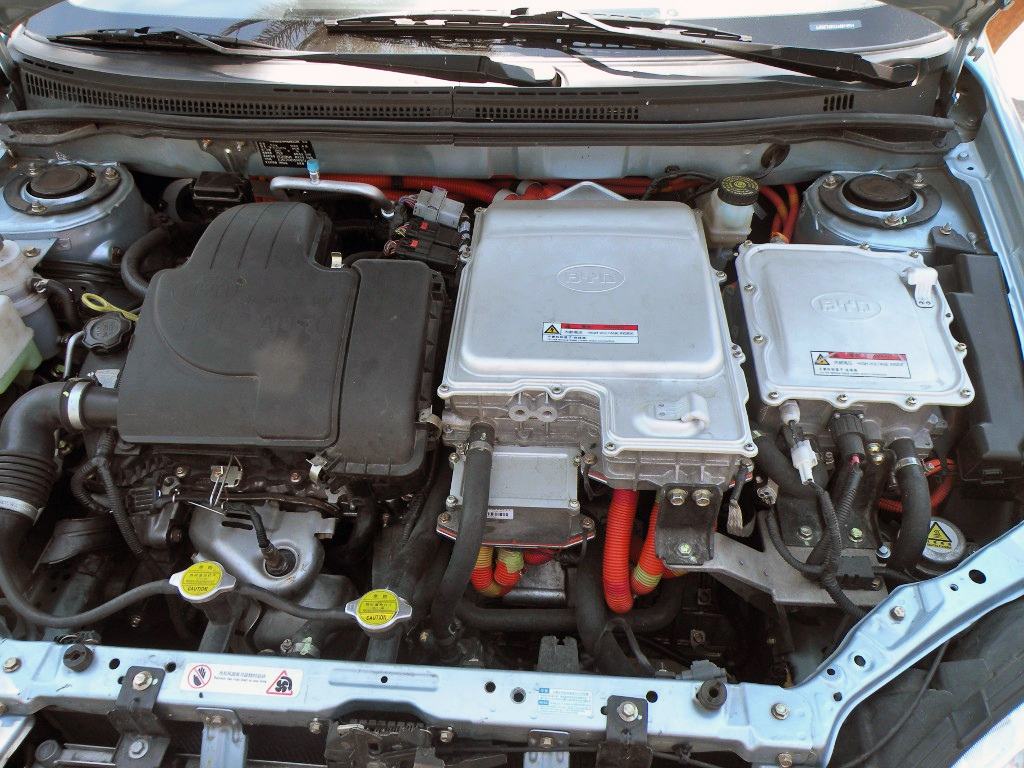
BYD's engine bay. Left side: the 1.0-liter gasoline engine; right side: the power control unit on top of the electric motor

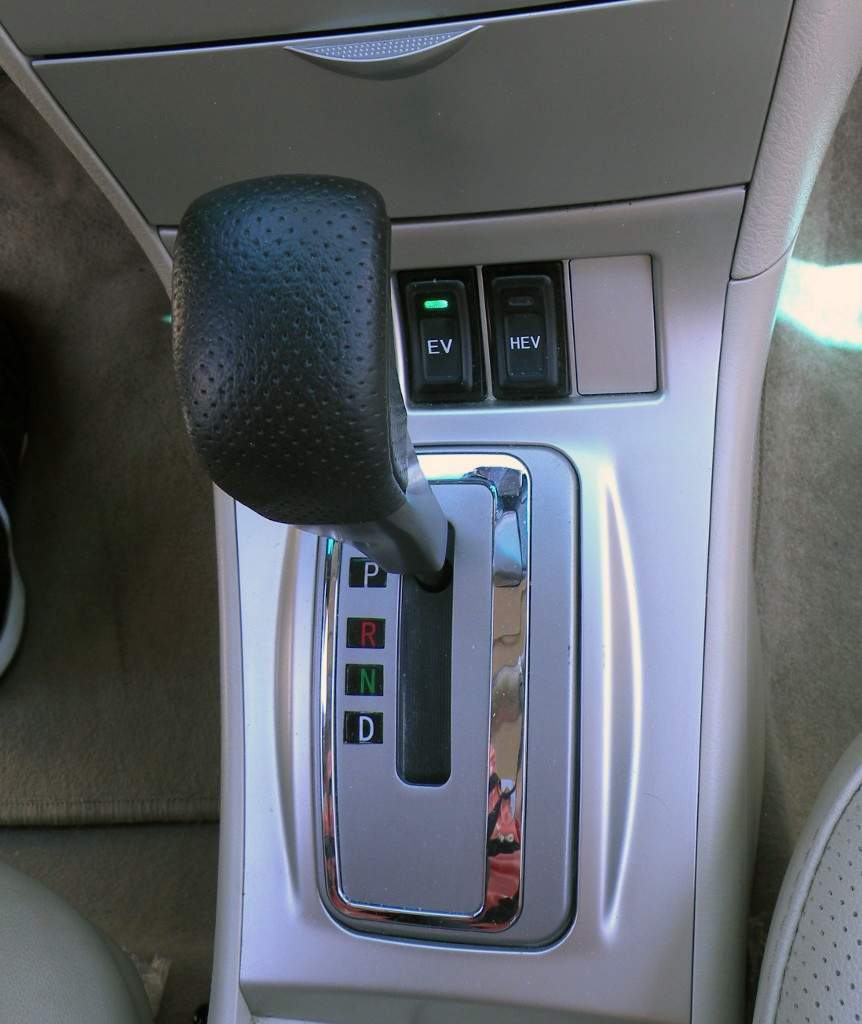
F3DM switch buttons to select hybrid mode or EV mode.

The F3DM has two alternating current electric motors, a 50-kilowatt unit that drives the wheels and a 25-kilowatt helper that can send power to the wheels or generate electricity through regenerative braking. The two motors provide all the propulsion until the charge level of the F3DM's batteries reaches 20%, then after this threshold the car automatically switches from electric mode operation to hybrid mode. At that point, the F3DM's 1-liter 3-cylinder engine kicks in to bring the battery charge as close as possible to 30%, effectively extending the range of the vehicle just like the Chevrolet Volt does. The F3DM has a direct connection between the gasoline engine and the wheels that is useful when accelerating onto a highway, just like the Prius. Under high-load circumstances, the 68 horsepower gasoline engine combines with the electric motors to deliver a total of 168 horsepower (125 kW).

BYD calls the F3DM is a dual-mode vehicle because it allows the driver to manually switch from all-electric to plug-in hybrid operation. The hybrid powertrain uses a 1.0-liter engine with battery-assisted acceleration at low speeds and the gasoline engine clutches to drive the wheels when more power is required. The estimated fuel economy is 30 mpg_{‑US} (7.8 L/100 km; 36 mpg_{‑imp}).

== Price and sales ==
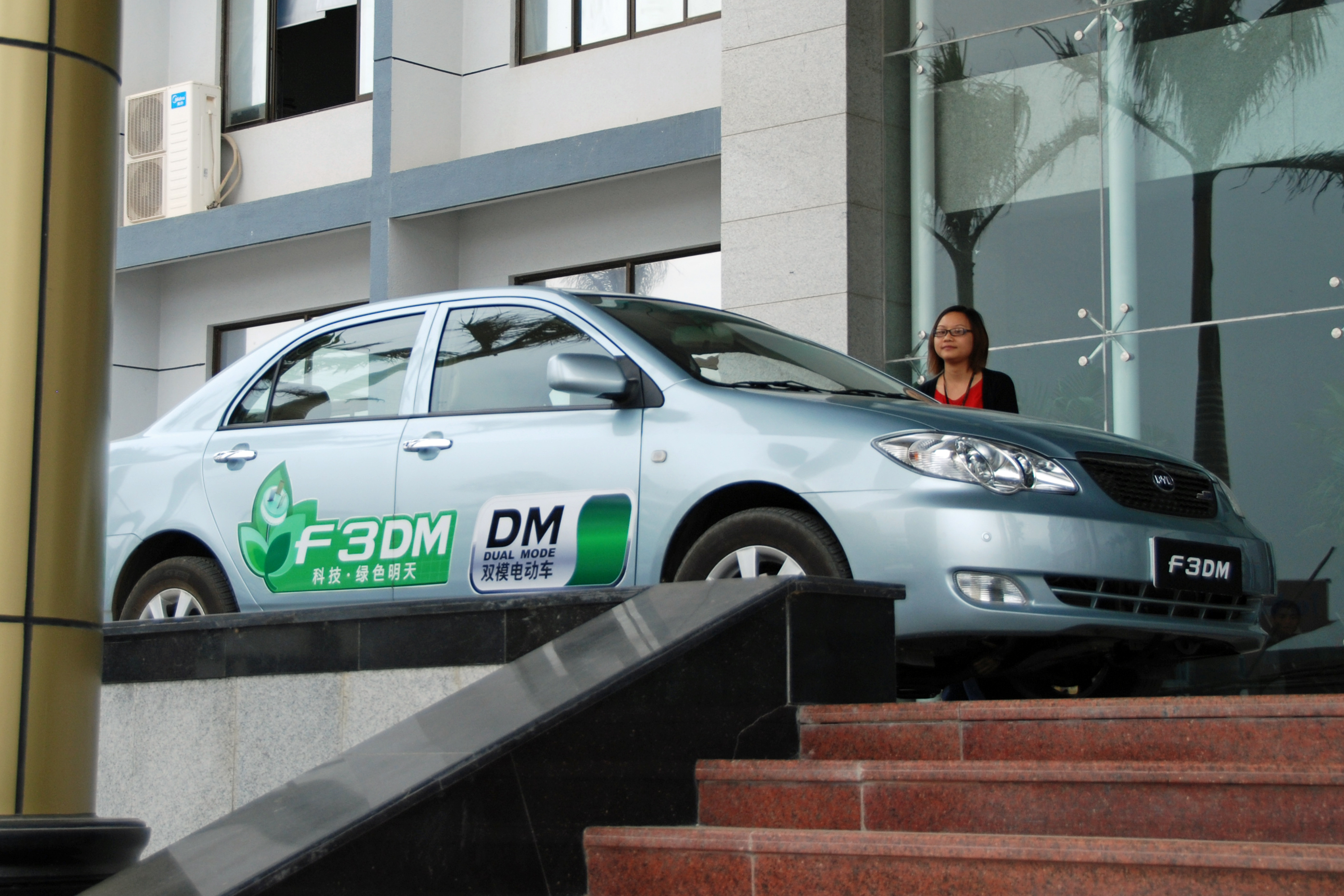
A promotional BYD F3DM in Shenzhen, China.

=== China ===
On December 15, 2008, the F3DM began selling for 149,800 yuan (about USD 21,900). In April 2009, the CEO Wang Chuanfu announced the price will be lowered to increase sales, but currently the price of a 2010 F3DM (with solar panels) is up to 169,800 yuan (US$25,792). Wang also wants an independent verification of the car's on-road performance.

During its first year in the market the F3DM plug-in sold only 48 vehicles to corporate and government customers. The premium price of the plug-in and lack of government subsidies are the main reasons cited by BYD for slow sales; others mention poor quality and "crude transitions" between electric and gasoline power. During 2009 BYD Auto sold 290,963 of the gasoline-powered F3s, which starts at 59,800 yuan (~US$8,750, just over a third of the price of an F3DM) and was China's best-selling model.

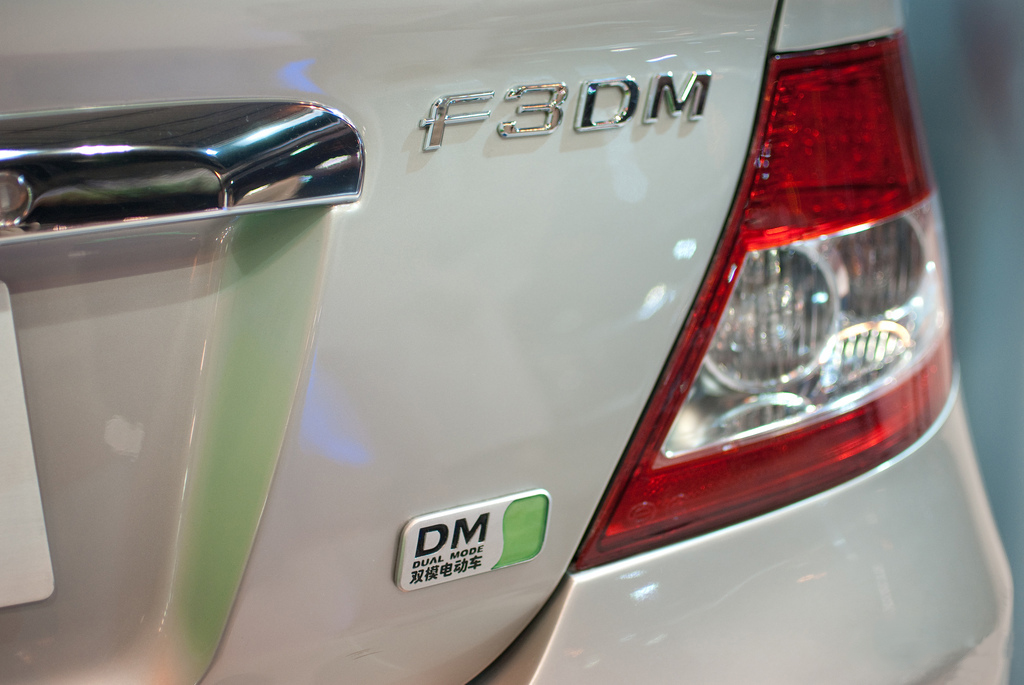
BYD F3M dual mode badging.

Since March 29, 2010, BYD Auto began selling the F3DM to the general public in Shenzhen, Guangdong Province, but only 28 units were sold during the first three months and all were sold to the Shenzhen local government. Among the reasons cited for the slow sales are the lack of infrastructure to charge, the high battery cost, and also the batteries have been reported to be unreliable.

As the F3DM nearly doubles the price of cars that run on conventional fuel, BYD expects subsidies from the local government to make the plug-in affordable to personal buyers. Similar subsidies are expected in other cities. On June 1, 2010, the Chinese government announced a trial program to provide incentives to carmakers up to 50,000 yuan (~US$7,320) for plug-in hybrids that will benefit residents in five cities: Shanghai, Shenzhen, Hangzhou, Hefei and Changchun. After the plug-in subsidy is discounted from the F3DM cost, its sales price would be still almost US$5,900 higher than the gasoline-powered F3 model.

A total of 417 units were delivered in 2010, with BYD claiming that they could not build enough batteries to meet demand. A total of 613 units were sold during 2011, 1,201 units in 2012, and 1,005 units during the first ten months of 2013. Sales ended in October 2013, and cumulative sales reached 3,284 F3DMs since December 2008.

=== United States ===
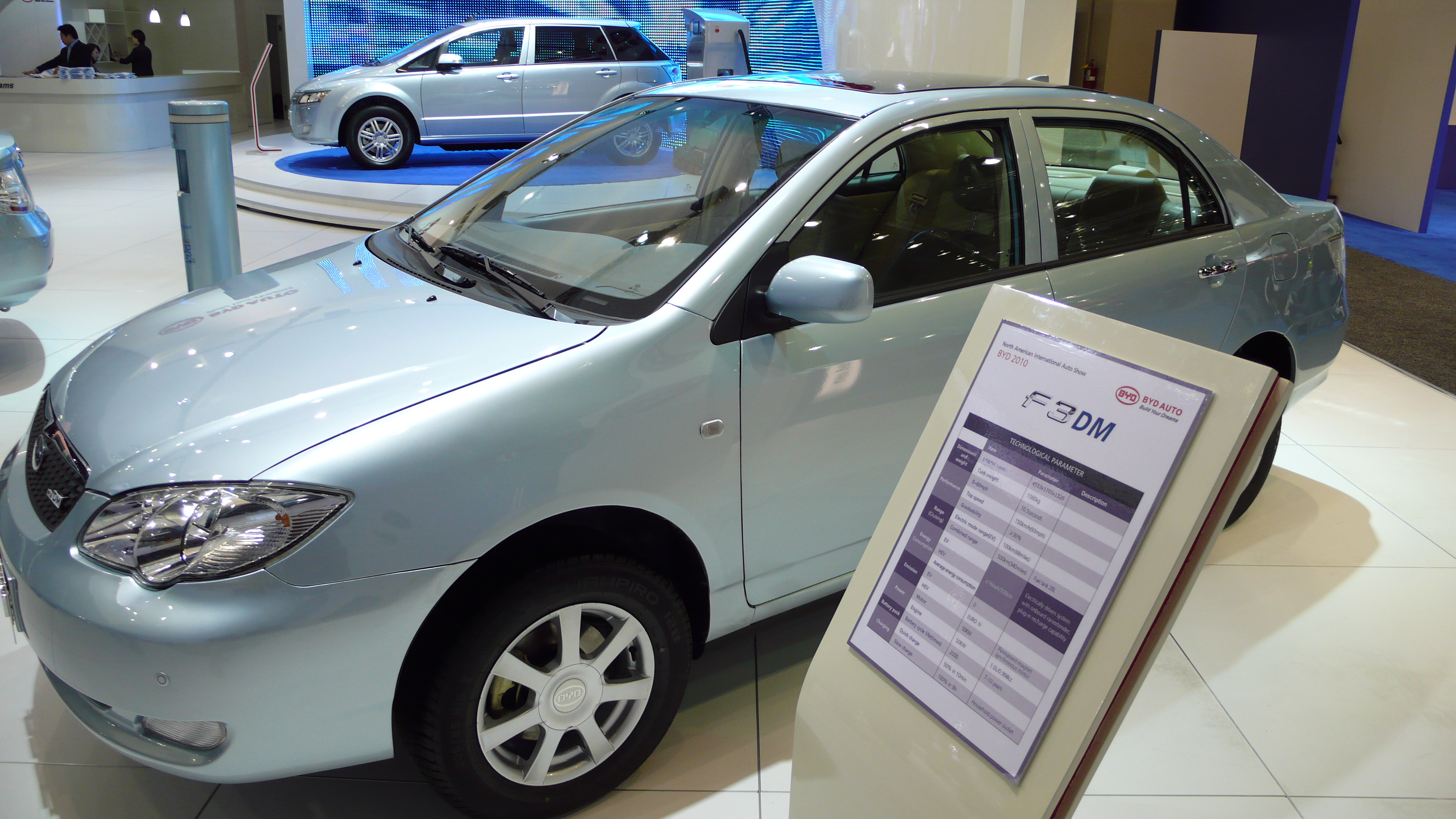
BYD F3DM exhibited at the 2010 North American International Auto Show.

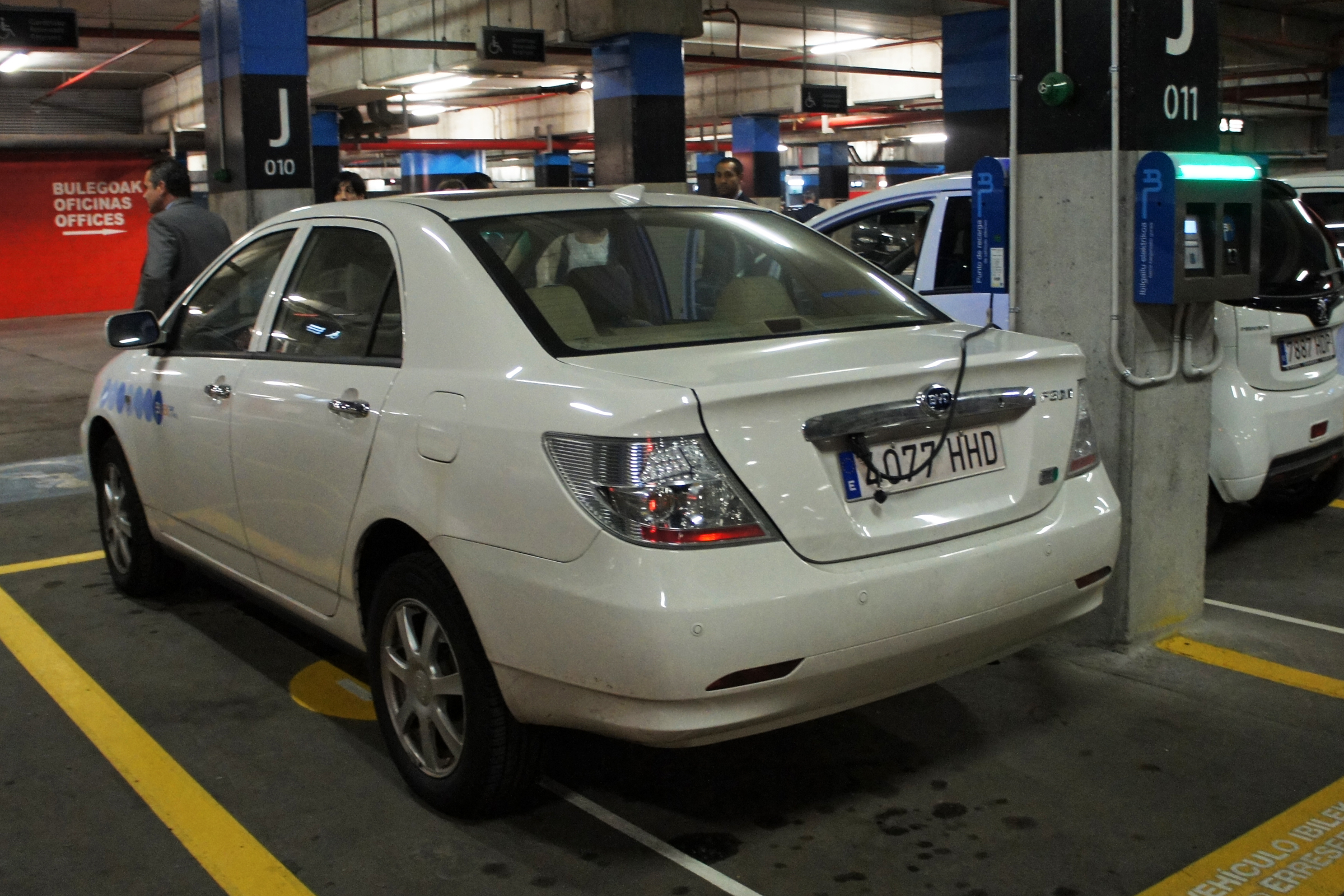
BYD F3DM charging in Bilbao, Spain

A testing program was launched in December 2010 with the participation of the Housing Authority of the City of Los Angeles (HACLA), which leased ten F3DMs for US$400 a month for one year. The trial F3DM sedans delivered to HACLA have an all-electric range of 40 to 60 miles (64 to 97 km) and drivers can manually switch the vehicle to stay in all-electric vehicle (EV mode). For trips longer than 60 miles the vehicle can be manually switched to plug-in-hybrid electric, which engages the 1.0-liter gasoline engine to extend the range another 300 miles (480 km) while charging the batteries. The onboard overnight-charger allows to charge the plug-in hybrid in less than 7 hours, allowing HACLA to install standard 220VAC outlets in its EV fleet parking areas.

In April 2011 BYD reported that the HACLA fleet achieved an average of 88 miles per US gallon (2.7 L/100 km) equivalent (MPG-e) based on a total of 14,430 mi (23,220 km) accumulated by the fleet, of which ~10,430 miles (16,790 km) were traveled in all-electric mode, representing 72.3 percent of the total mileage logged by the HACLA fleet, and only 4,000 miles (6,400 km) using gasoline.

The F3DM was scheduled to begin retail sales in the U.S. in 2012 at a price of US$28,800 before any federal and local incentives. In October 2011 BYD opened its headquarters in Los Angeles, a year behind schedule, and announced that retail sales will be delayed due to the lack of charging infrastructure.

=== Spain ===
Sales of the F3DM began in Spain at a price of €27,585 in August 2011. A total of 8 units were sold in 2011, followed by two more cars in 2012.

== See also ==
- BYD e6
- BYD F6DM
- BYD Qin
- Electric car use by country
- Government incentives for plug-in electric vehicles
- History of plug-in hybrids
- List of modern production plug-in electric vehicles
- Plug-in electric vehicle
