= BYD F3 =

Compact car

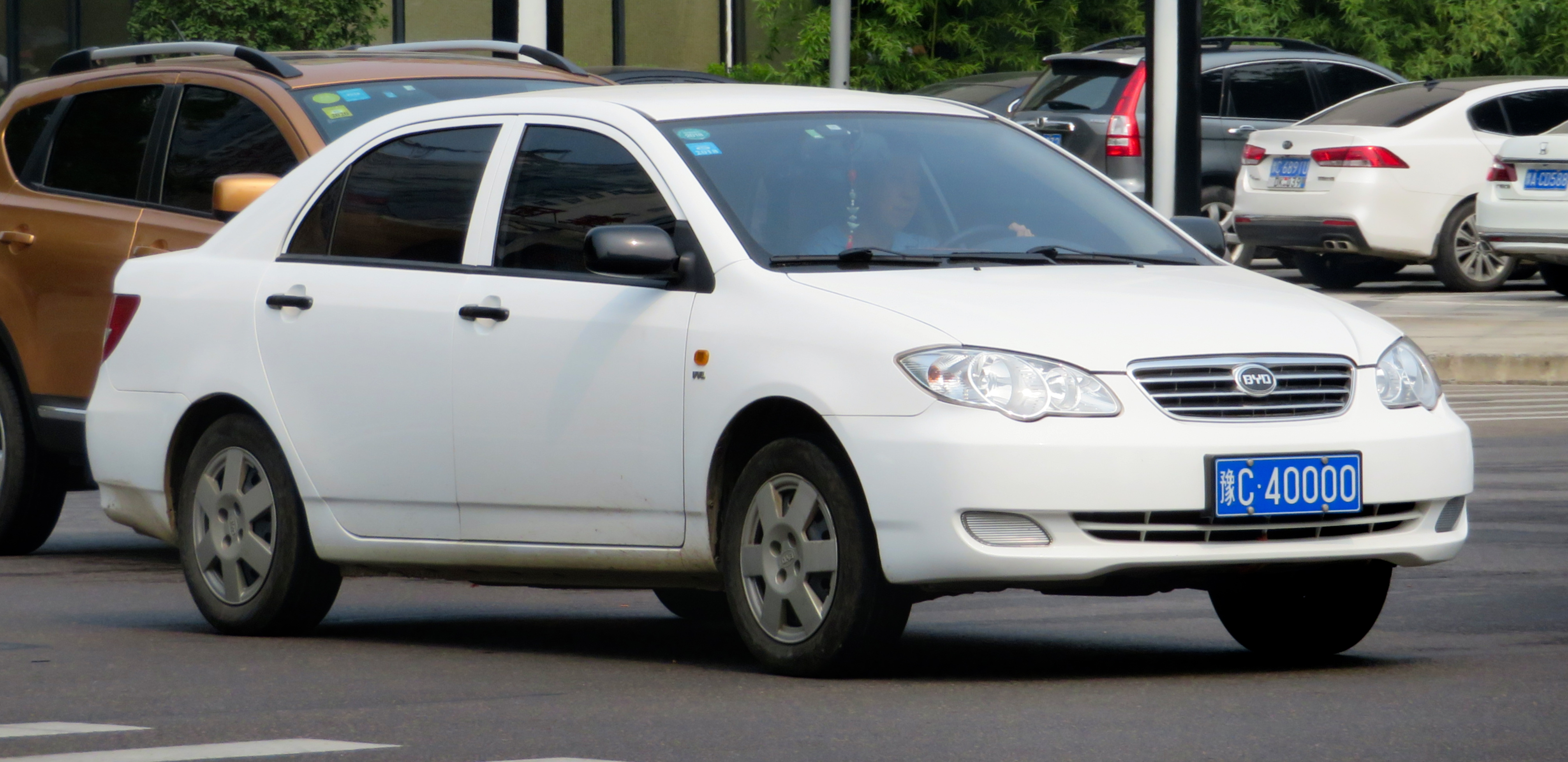
- 2009 BYD F3

Overview
- Manufacturer: BYD Auto
- Production: 2005–2021

Body and chassis
- Class: Compact car
- Layout: Front-engine, front-wheel-drive

Chronology
- Successor: BYD Qin

The BYD F3 is a compact car that was produced by the Chinese car manufacturer BYD between 2005 and 2021. The first BYD vehicle of their own design, production of the first generation model commenced in September 2005. A few variants were introduced including the BYD F3DM plug-in hybrid version, and the larger and more premium BYD G3 and BYD L3.

The second generation was launched in 2012 as a more premium option called the Surui. The second generation model was sold alongside the first generation facelift models and spawned the more upmarket BYD Qin which later replaced the Surui and fits inline with the rest of the Dynasty series BYD models.

== First generation (2005) ==
First generation
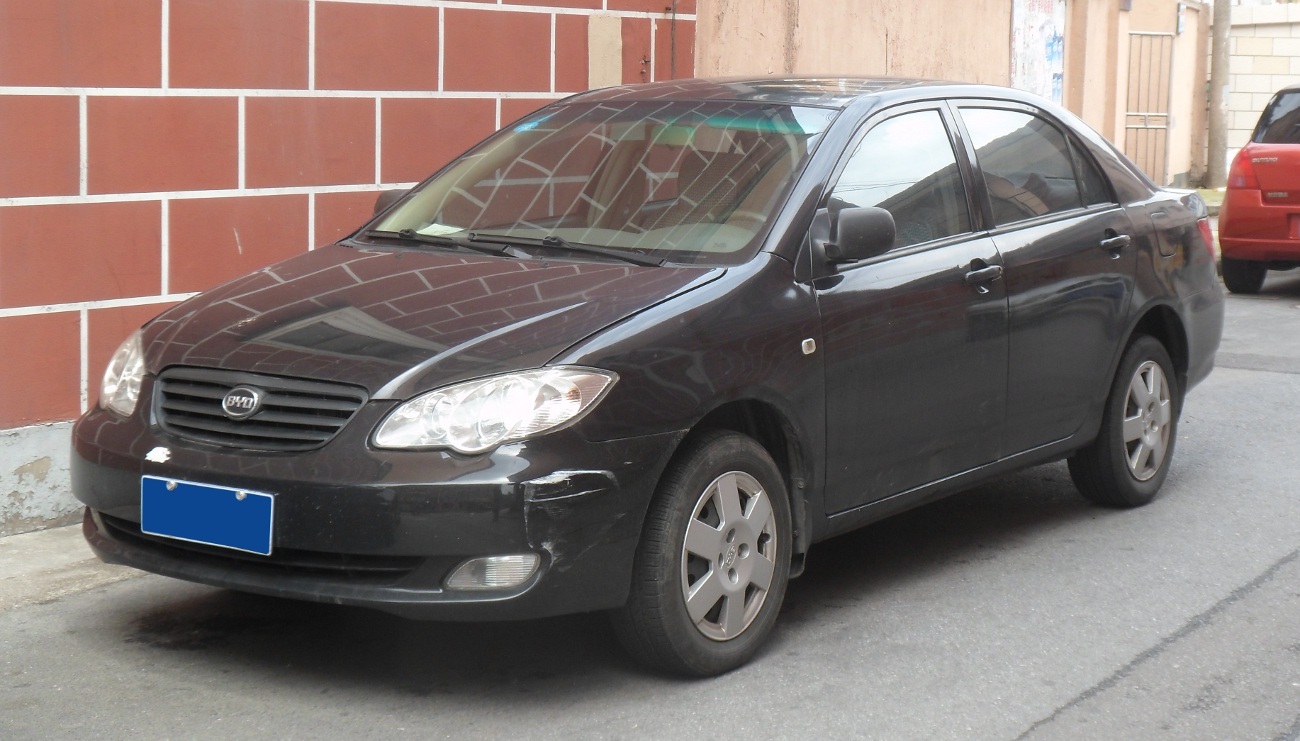
- BYD F3 (2005–2014)

Overview
- Also called: BYD L3 (2010–2015)
- Production: 2005–2021

Body and chassis
- Body style: 4-door sedan; 5-door hatchback (F3R)
- Related: BYD F3DM; BYD Qin; BYD G3; BYD L3; BYD S8

Powertrain
- Engine: 1.5 L BYD473QD/473QE/473QF I4 (petrol) (2011–present); 1.5 L 4G15S I4 (petrol) (2005–2010); 1.6 L 4G18 I4 (petrol) (2005–2010); 1.8 L BYD483QA I4 (petrol) (2007)
- Transmission: 5-speed MaTriX manual (2005–2021); 6-speed automatic (2014–present); 4-speed automatic (2008–2010)

Dimensions
- Wheelbase: 2,600 mm (102.4 in)
- Length: 4,533 mm (178.5 in) (2005–2013); 4,605 mm (181.3 in) (2014–2015); 4,617 mm (181.8 in) (2016–2021)
- Width: 1,705 mm (67.1 in) (2005–2015); 1,716 mm (67.6 in) (2016–2021)
- Height: 1,490 mm (58.7 in) (2005–2015); 1,480 mm (58.3 in) (2016–2021)
- Curb weight: 1,210 kg (2,668 lb)

The first generation BYD F3 commenced production in September 2005. The original F3 is powered by Mitsubishi's 4G-series four-cylinder engines for early models.

Between 2011 and 2013, the BYD F3 was assembled in Russia, at TagAZ factory.

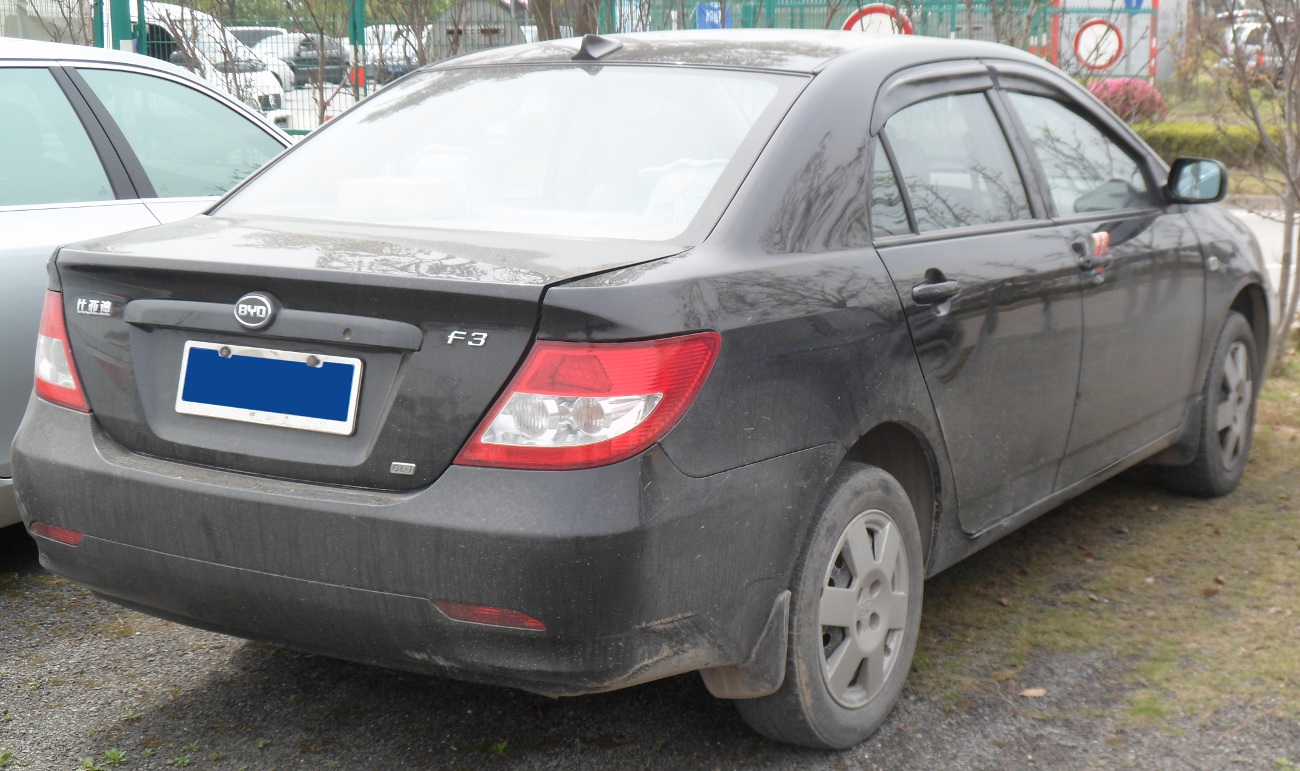
2005–2014 BYD F3 rear

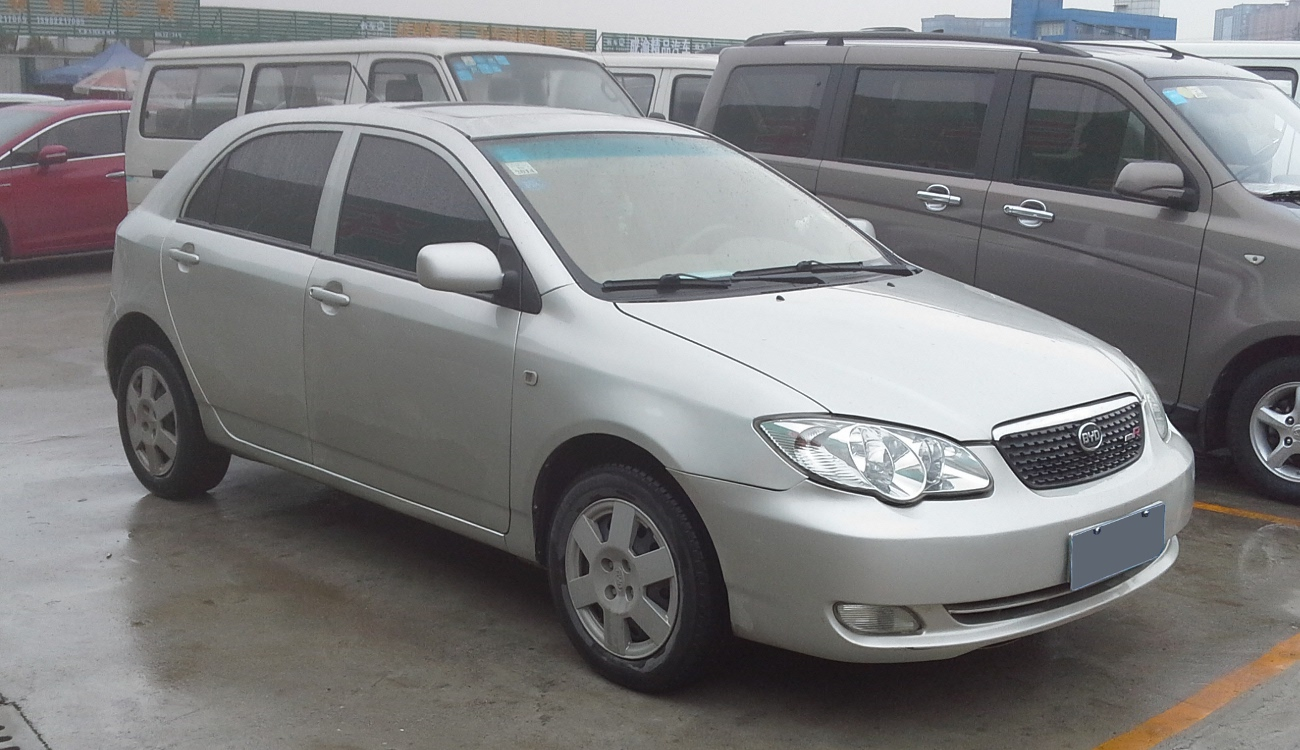
2007 BYD F3R front

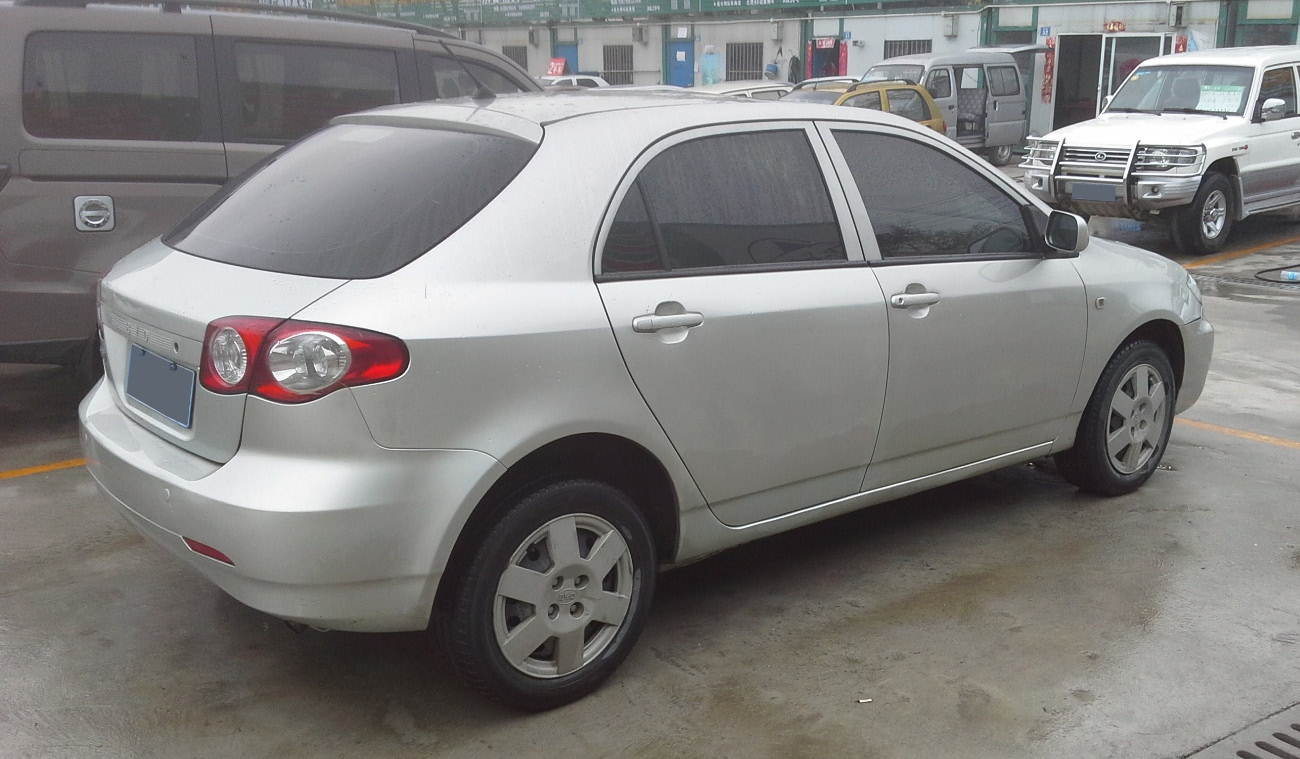
2007 BYD F3R rear

=== 2014 facelift ===
In March 2014, the first generation BYD F3 was facelifted and started production that year alongside the second generation model. It was given a new grille, headlights, tail lights, bumpers, wheels and mirrors. It runs on a 1.5-litre four cylinder engine known as the BYD473QE producing 107 horsepower. This engine has been the signature for the F3 since 2011. A turbocharged 1.5-litre engine is also available as the BYD476ZQA producing 151 horsepower. Transmission choices for this model are 5-speed manual, 6-speed manual or a 6-speed automatic gearbox. The 1.5-litre turbo engine was discontinued in mid-2015.

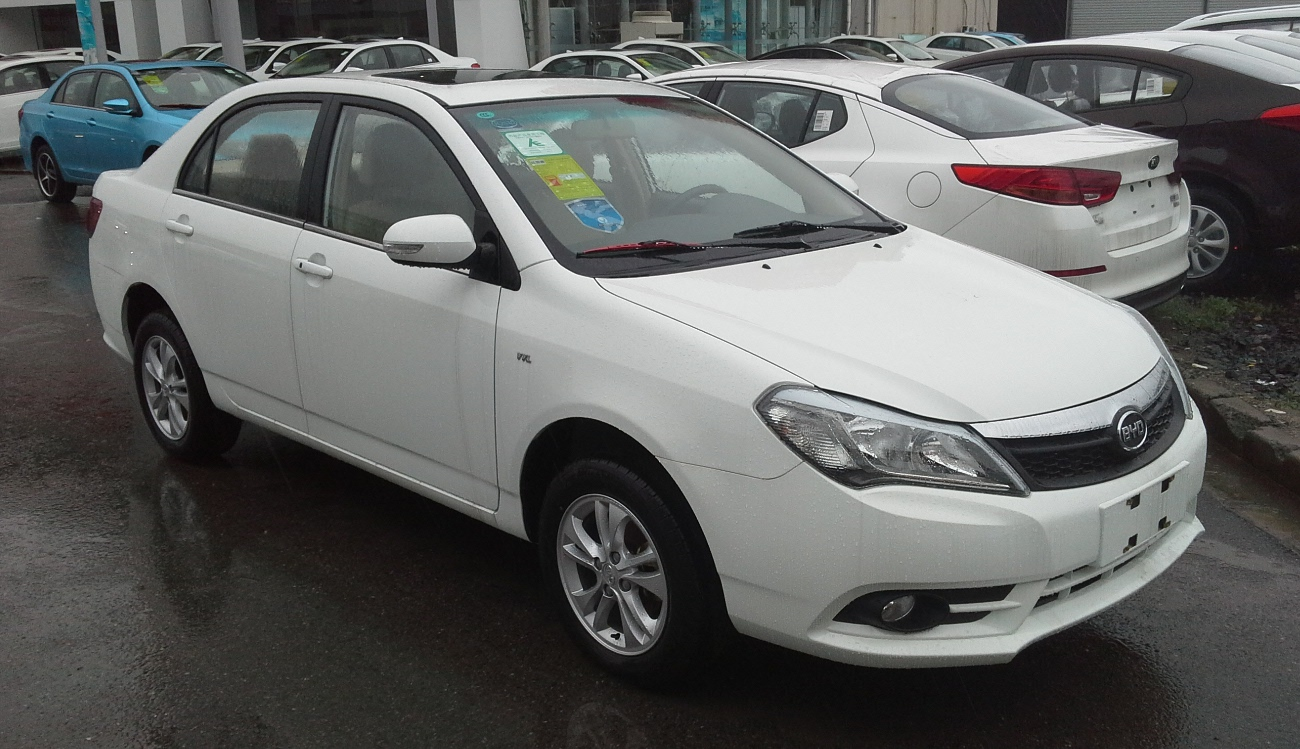
2014–2016 BYD F3 2014 facelift front

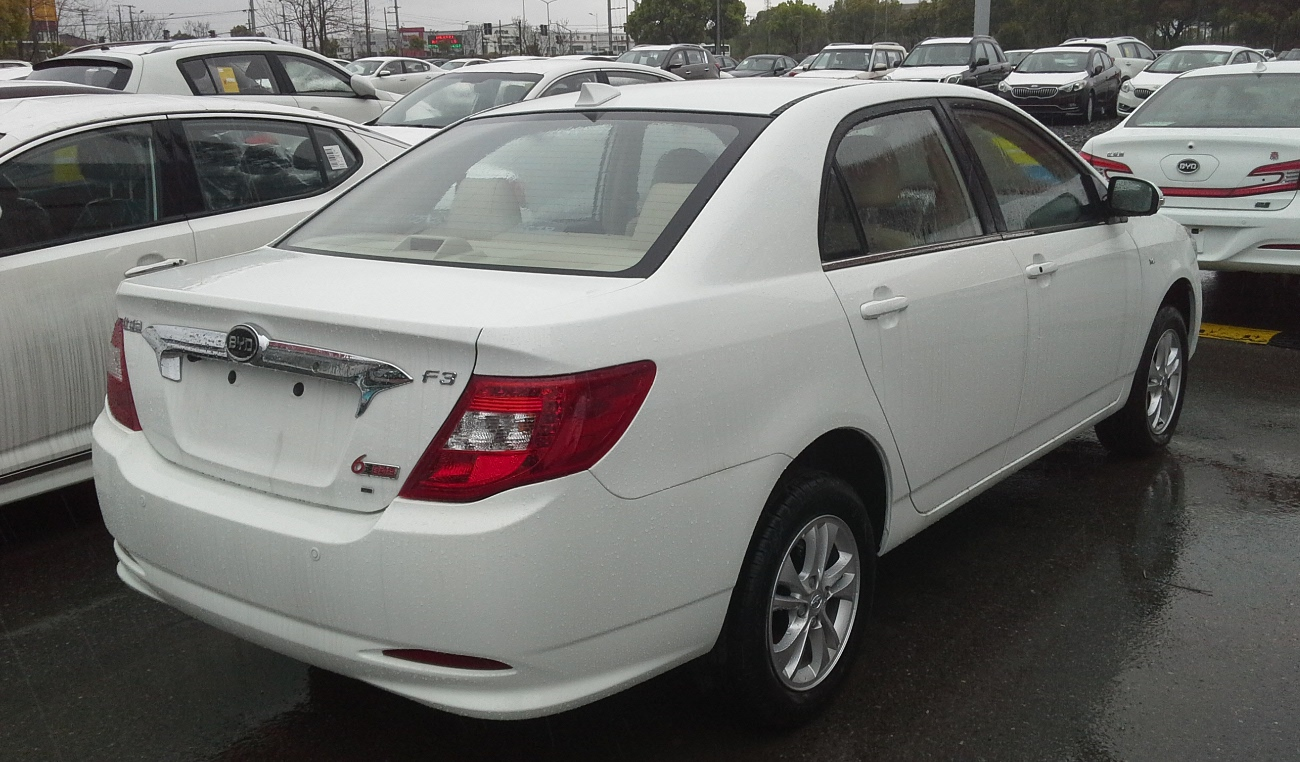
2014–2016 BYD F3 2014 facelift rear

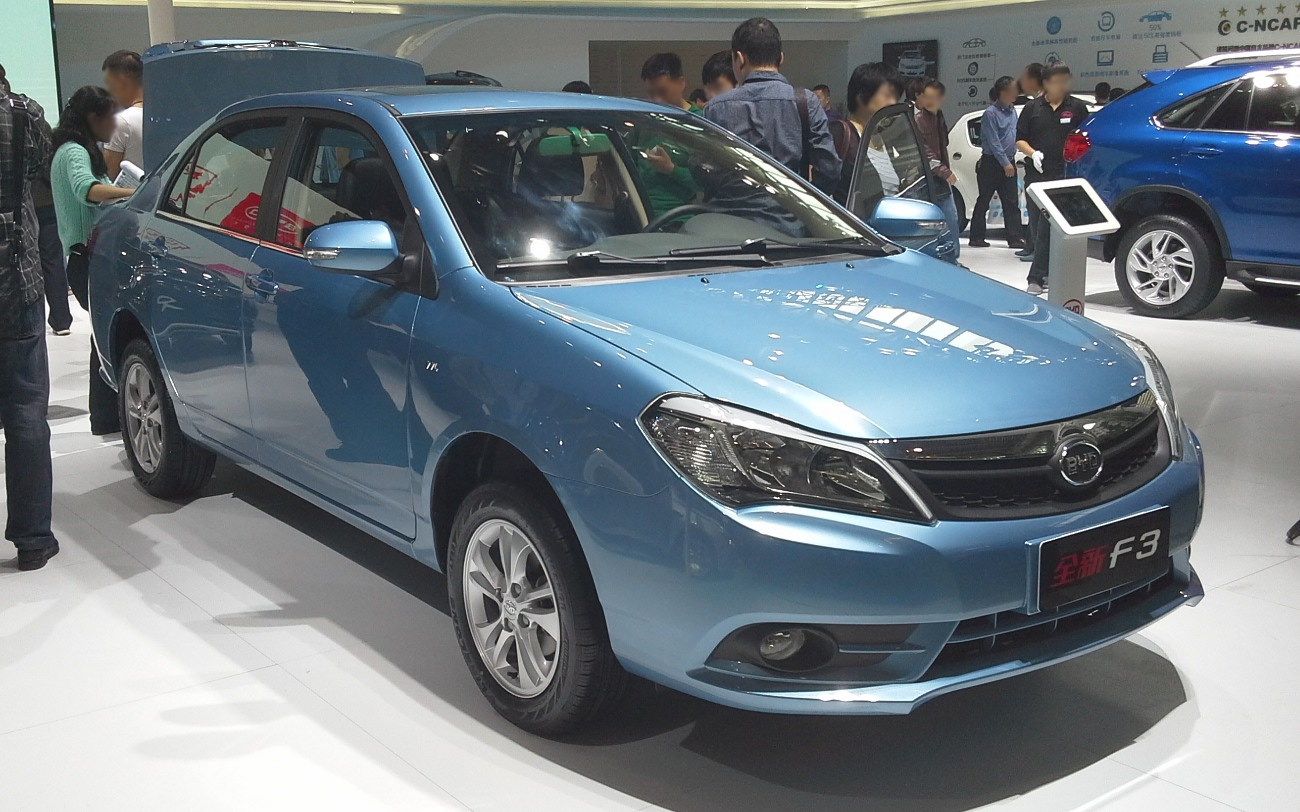
BYD F3 2014 facelift at the Auto China 2014

=== 2016 facelift (MY2016–2020) ===
The F3 received another facelift in 2015 for the 2016 model year. The updated F3 is powered by the same 1.5 liter inline-four engine with 109 hp, mated to a five-speed manual transmission or a six-speed automatic transmission. The facelift features redesigned front ends and rear ends. The F3 2016 facelift was rebadged and sold as the updated BYD L3 in foreign markets. The last model year update was in 2020 while still carrying the 2016 model year appearance.

2016–2020 BYD F3 MY2016 facelift front

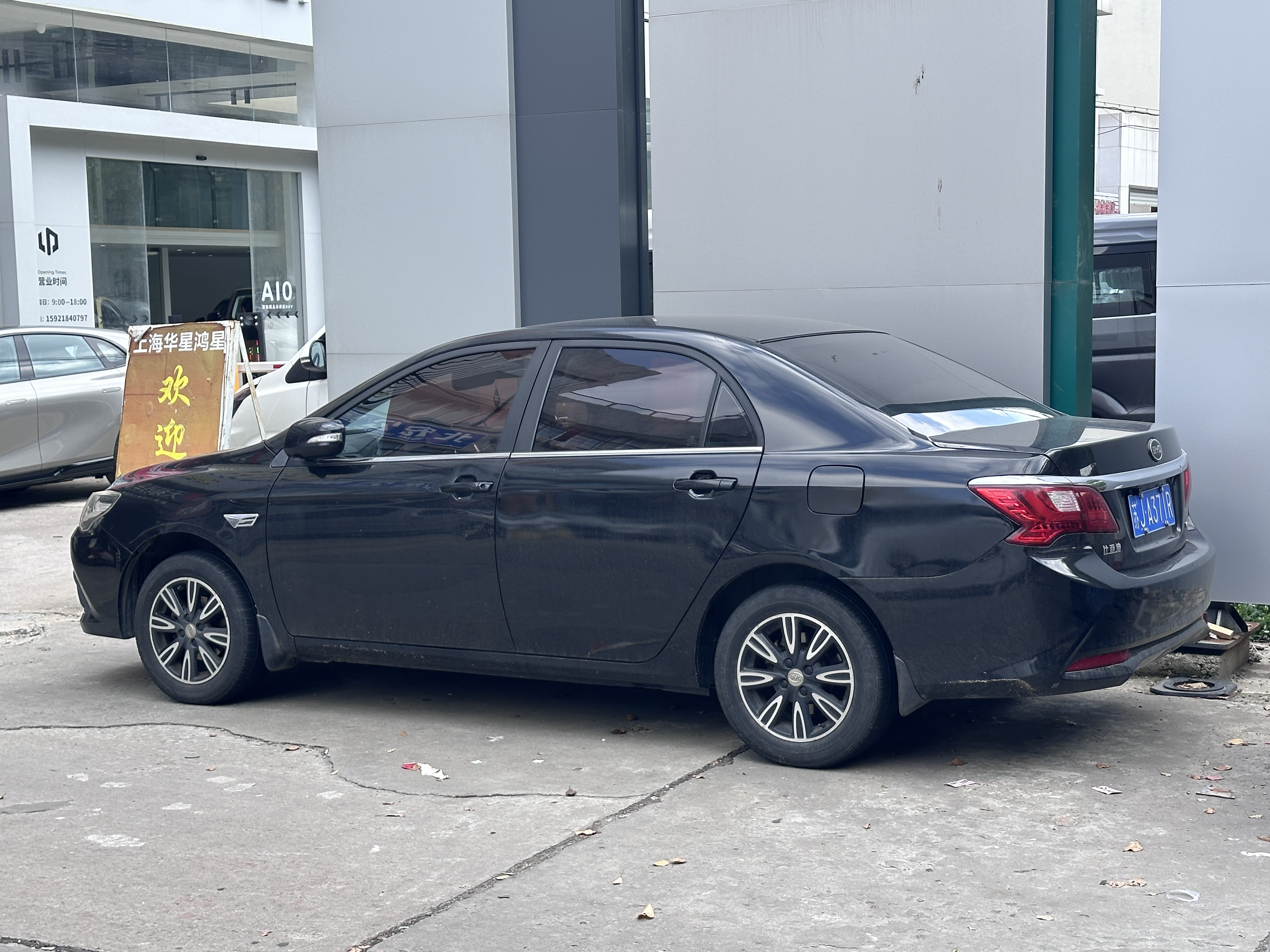
2016–2020 BYD F3 MY2016 facelift rear

=== 2019 return ===
The first-generation F3 made a return in 2019 for the 2020 model year with the only one trim level available known as the Classic version. The same 1.5 litre engine is standard known as the BYD473QF and is paired to a 5-speed manual gearbox.

=== Specification ===
The BYD F3 features a 4-cylinder, 1.5-liter, Mitsubishi Orion engine (4G15S) with distributor-less Bosch ignition and fuel injection. The vehicle boasts Euro 4 emissions standards. Engine output is 78 kW (105 hp). Fuel efficiency is rated at approx 4.7 L/100 km (60 mpg_{‑imp}; 50 mpg_{‑US}). A 1.6-liter Mitsubishi Orion engine (4G18) was standard. Engine output is 73.5 kW (99 hp) while fuel efficiency is rated at approx 5 L/100 km (56 mpg_{‑imp}; 47 mpg_{‑US}). The Mitsubishi engines were then replaced by new BYD engines from 2011 onwards. The transmission MaTriX is a 5-speed manual transmission. Three point safety belts, power steering, alloy wheels fitted with 195/60 R15 tires, 4-wheel ABS disk brake system as standard, LED tail lights, and halogen headlights.

=== Equipment ===
The BYD F3 owner can choose from three trim packages (GL-i, GL-X, and GL- Xi). All models come with standard equipment: AC, AM/FM/CD/MP3 stereo, electric windows and mirrors. Optional equipment includes upgraded leather seats, 3rd brake-light, driver and passenger airbags, auxiliary front fog lights and upgraded audio / IVI (in vehicle infotainment). Color schemes are white, black, champagne, and red, with black being most common.

=== Derivatives ===
Derivatives of the BYD F3 include the BYD F3DM (plug-in hybrid), BYD F3R (hatchback), BYD L3 and BYD G3 (slightly larger version). In 2009, BYD introduced the G3 as an updated/upgraded compact class vehicle, however the F3 will continue to be sold in domestic markets.

== Second generation (2012) ==
BYD F3 Plus (Surui)
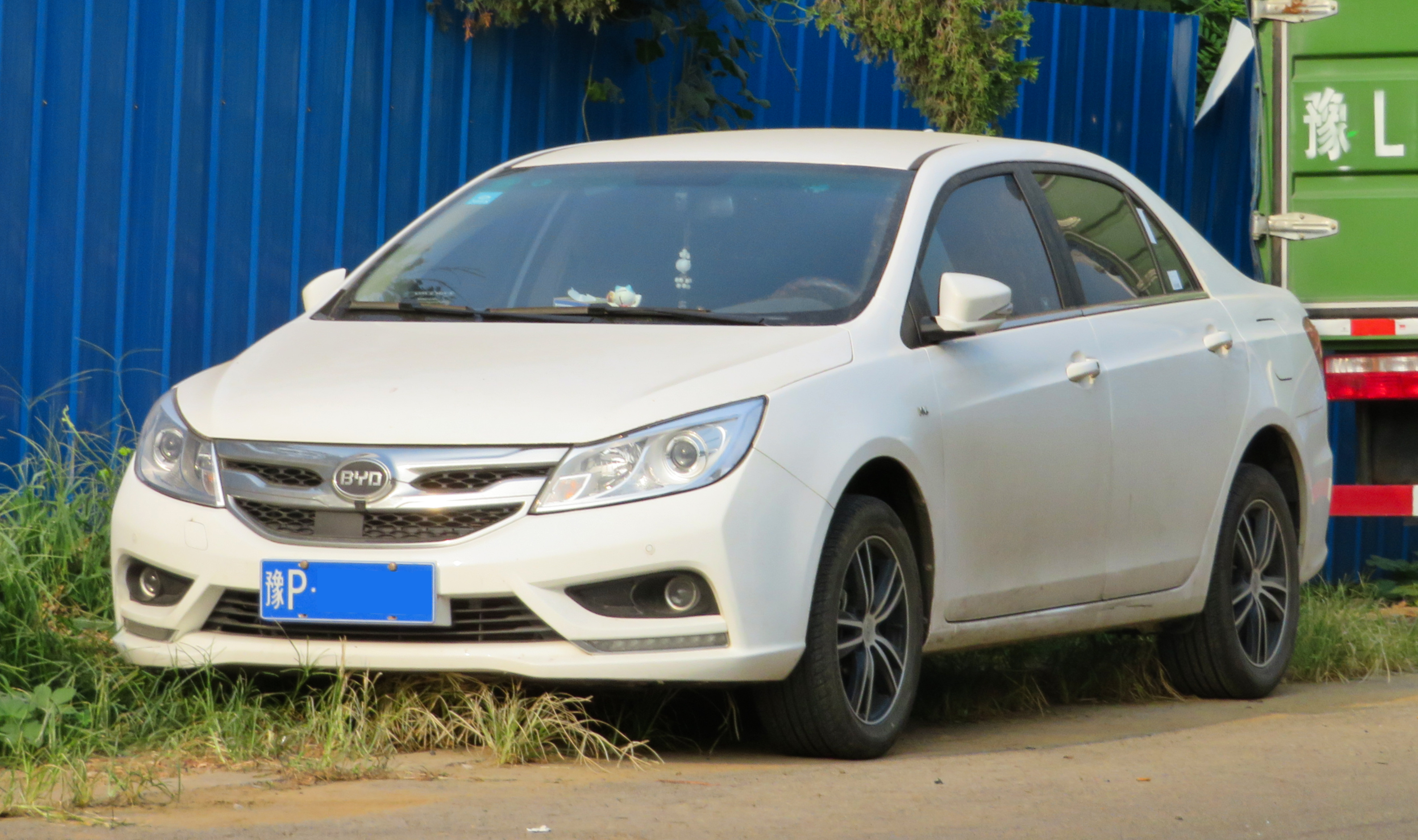
- BYD Surui facelift

Overview
- Also called: BYD Qin (2012–2019); BYD e5 (electric, 2015–2020); BYD F5
- Production: 2012–2020

Body and chassis
- Body style: 4-door sedan
- Related: BYD F3DM; BYD Qin; BYD G3; BYD L3

Powertrain
- Engine: 1.5 L BYD473QD/473QE/473QF I4 (petrol) (2012–2018); 1.5 L BYD476ZQA I4 (turbo petrol) (2014)
- Transmission: 6-speed manual (2012–2014 Surui); 5-speed MaTriX manual (2012–2018); 6-speed DCT (2013–2018)

Dimensions
- Wheelbase: 2,600 mm (102.4 in)
- Length: 4,605 mm (181.3 in) (2014–2015); 4,617 mm (181.8 in) (2016–2018)
- Width: 1,705 mm (67.1 in) (2005–2015); 1,716 mm (67.6 in) (2016–2018)
- Height: 1,490 mm (58.7 in) (2005–2015); 1,480 mm (58.3 in) (2016–2018)
- Curb weight: 1,210 kg (2,668 lb)

In April 2012, the second generation BYD F3 Plus, also called Surui, was launched at the Beijing Auto Show. During 2013, the BYD L3 was also introduced in several export markets as the New F3. Transmission choices are a 5-speed manual, 6-speed manual or 6-speed dual clutch gearbox.

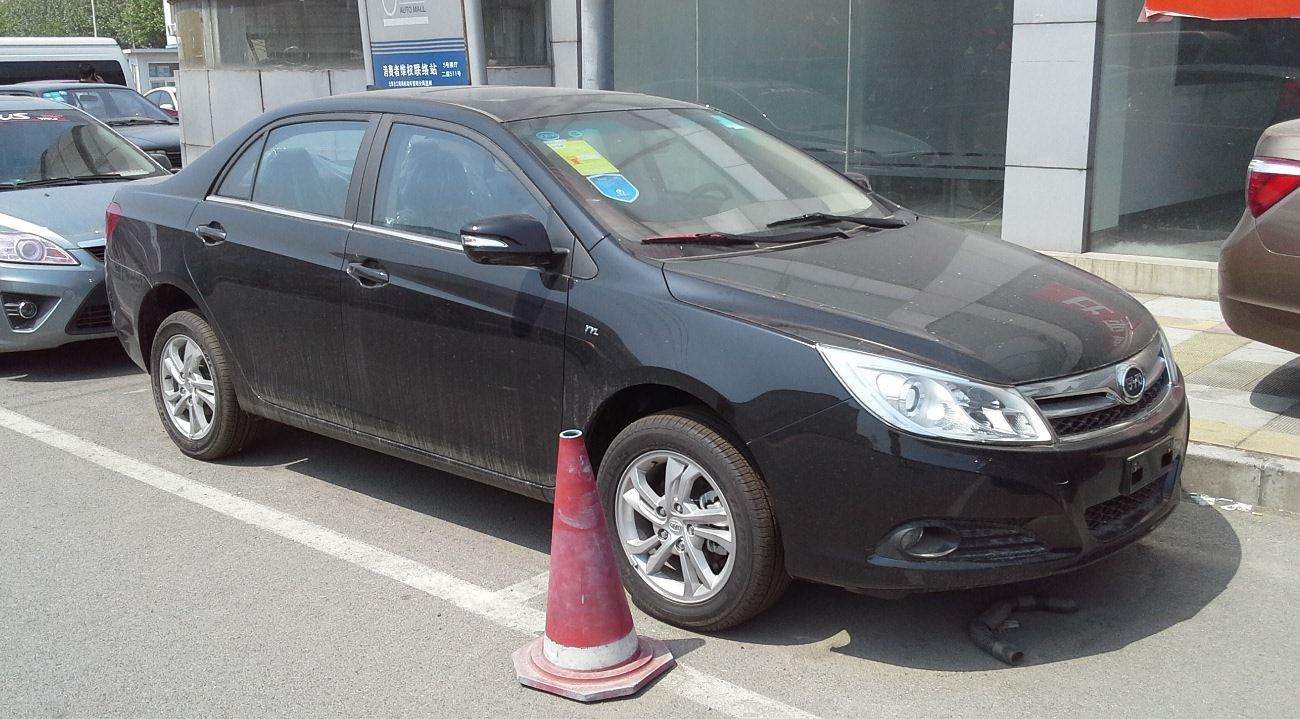
2012–2014 BYD Surui front

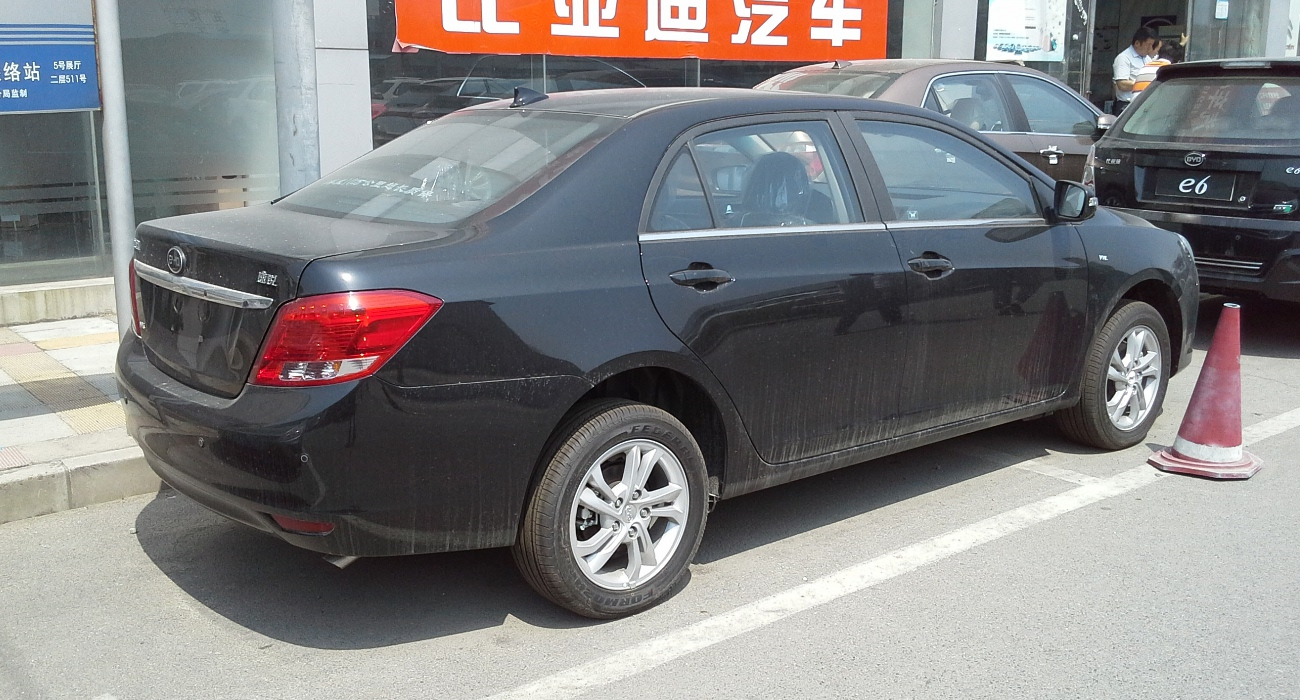
2012–2014 BYD Surui rear

=== 2015 facelift ===
In February 2015, the F3 was facelifted again known as the "third generation" F3. The facelift included new headlights and tail lights, bumpers and a new dashboard available for the 2016 model year. It runs on the same 1.5 BYD473QE engine. The turbocharged engine was not available. Transmission are a 5-speed manual or 6-speed automatic gearbox. Pricing ranges from CN¥ 55,900 to CN¥ 77,900.

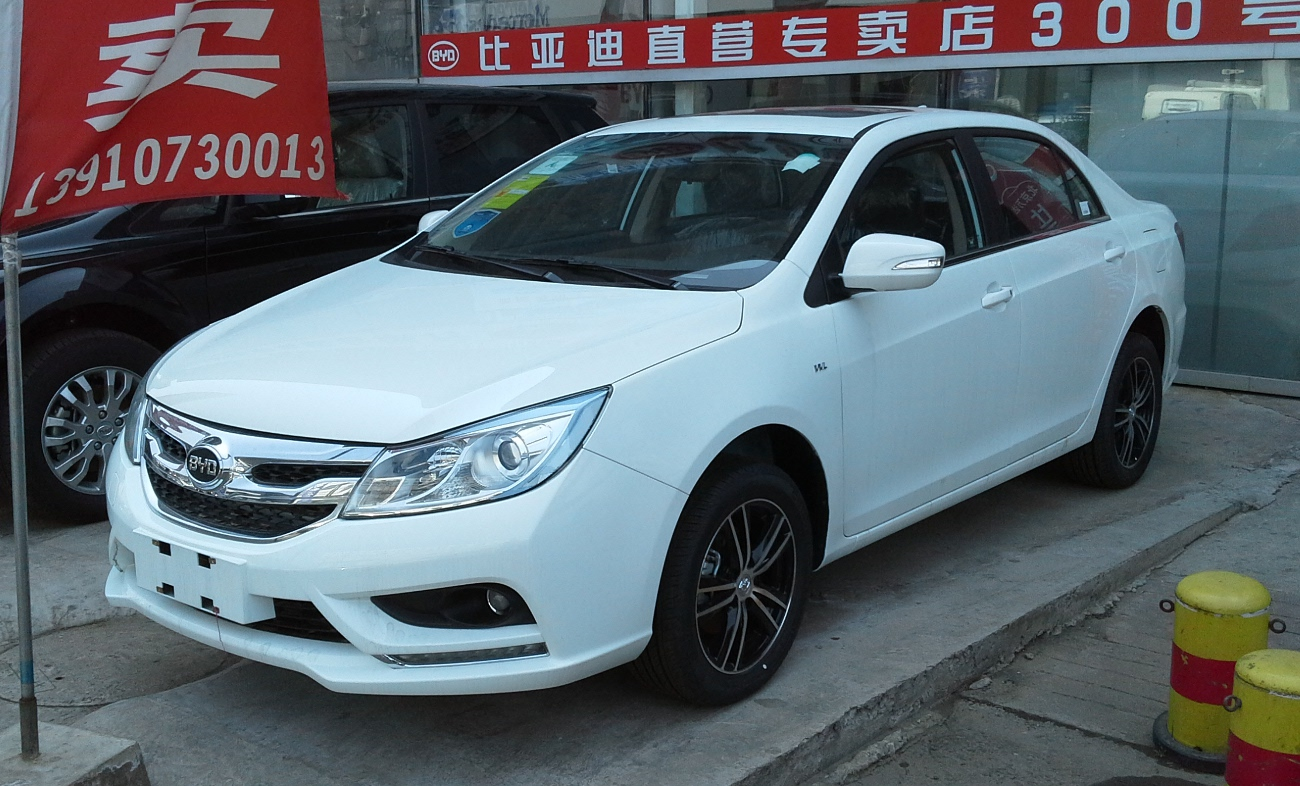
2015–2018 BYD Surui facelift front

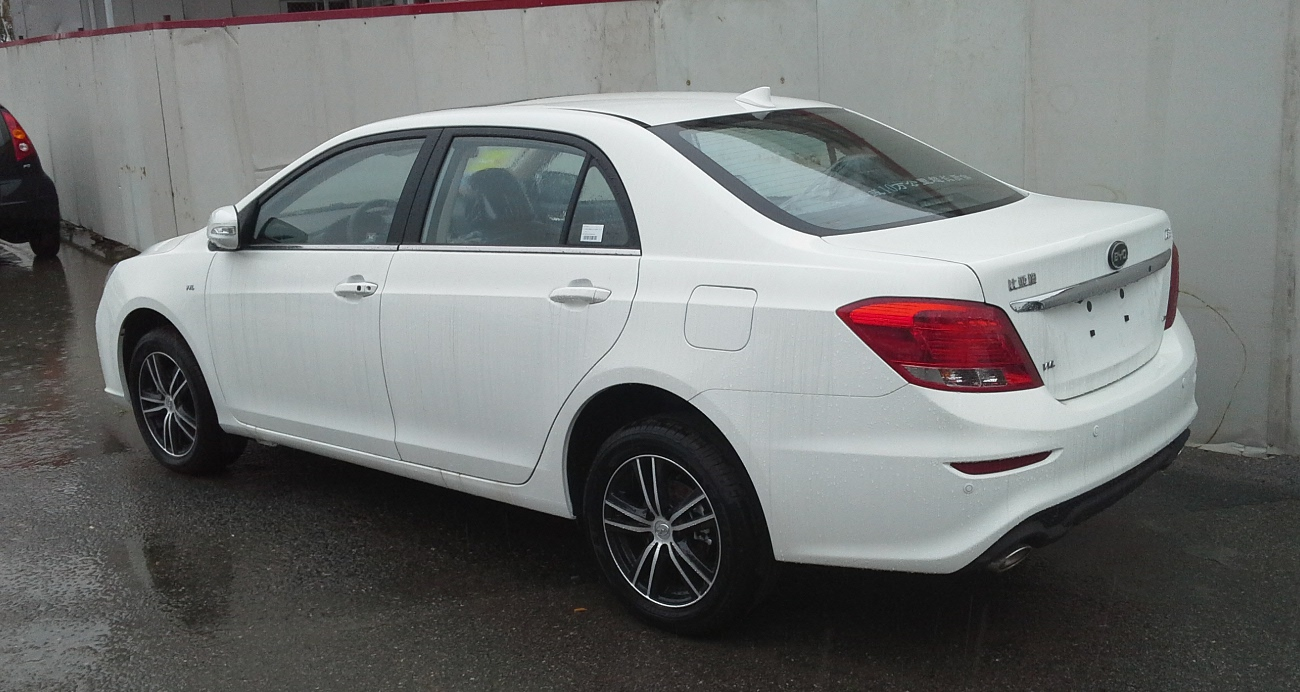
2015–2018 BYD Surui facelift rear

As of 2019, the F3 is still sold on the market alongside the Surui and the E5, powered by the BYD473QE engine paired to a 5-speed manual and 6-speed automatic gearbox. It was available with four trim levels known as Classic, Fashion, Elite and Exclusive with the automatic gearbox only available on the Exclusive model.

== Discontinuation ==
The BYD F3 was discontinued in late 2021 due to decreasing sales and BYD switching its focus onto electric vehicles.
