= BYD L3 =

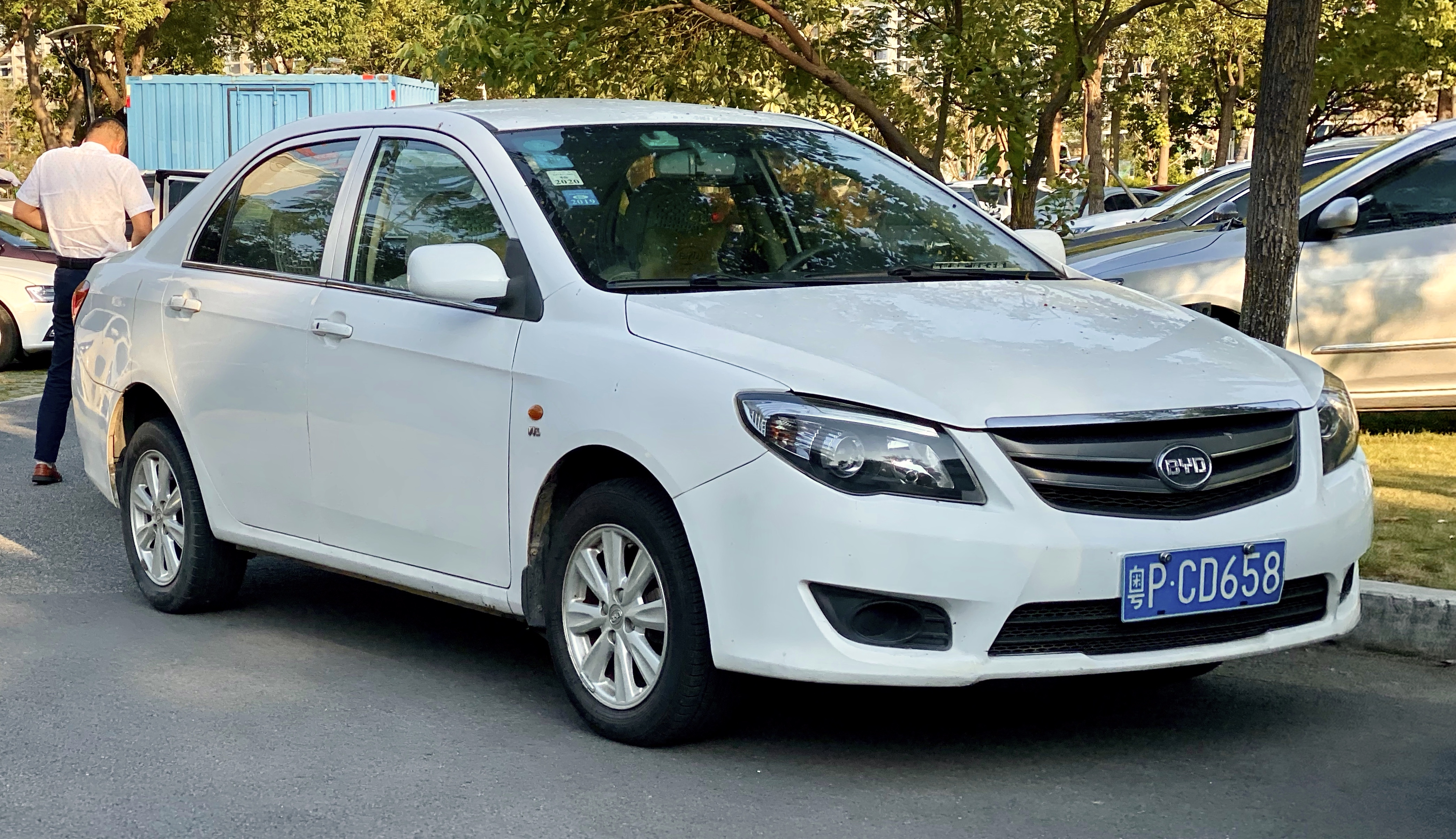

Overview
- Manufacturer: BYD
- Also called: BYD F5; BYD F3 Plus
- Production: 2010–2015

Body and chassis
- Class: Compact car
- Body style: 4-door sedan
- Layout: Front-engine, front-wheel-drive layout
- Related: BYD G3; BYD F3; BYD F3DM; BYD Qin

Powertrain
- Engine: 1.5 L BYD473QE I4 (petrol); 1.8 L BYD483QA I4 (petrol)
- Transmission: 5-speed manual; 6-speed DCT; CVT

Dimensions
- Wheelbase: 2,615 mm (103.0 in)
- Length: 4,568 mm (179.8 in)
- Width: 1,716 mm (67.6 in)
- Height: 1,480 mm (58.3 in)
- Curb weight: 1,210 kg (2,668 lb)

The BYD L3 (or BYD F5 and BYD New F3 in Latin America) is a compact car manufactured by BYD Co., Ltd., a Chinese automobile manufacturer based in Shenzhen, Guangdong Province.

Like the G3, BYD L3 is similar to the Toyota Corolla E120. A torsion beam is used as the rear suspension, MacPherson struts are installed in front, and the brakes on all wheels are disc.

== Overview ==
The BYD L3 is essentially an evolution of the BYD F3. The BYD L3 is also commercialized in Chile, Uruguay and other Latin America countries with the name of New F3.

Engine choices are a 1.5 or 1.8 litre engine with a 5 speed manual and 6 speed dual clutch available on the 1.5 models while the 1.8 models are paired with a CVT gearbox.

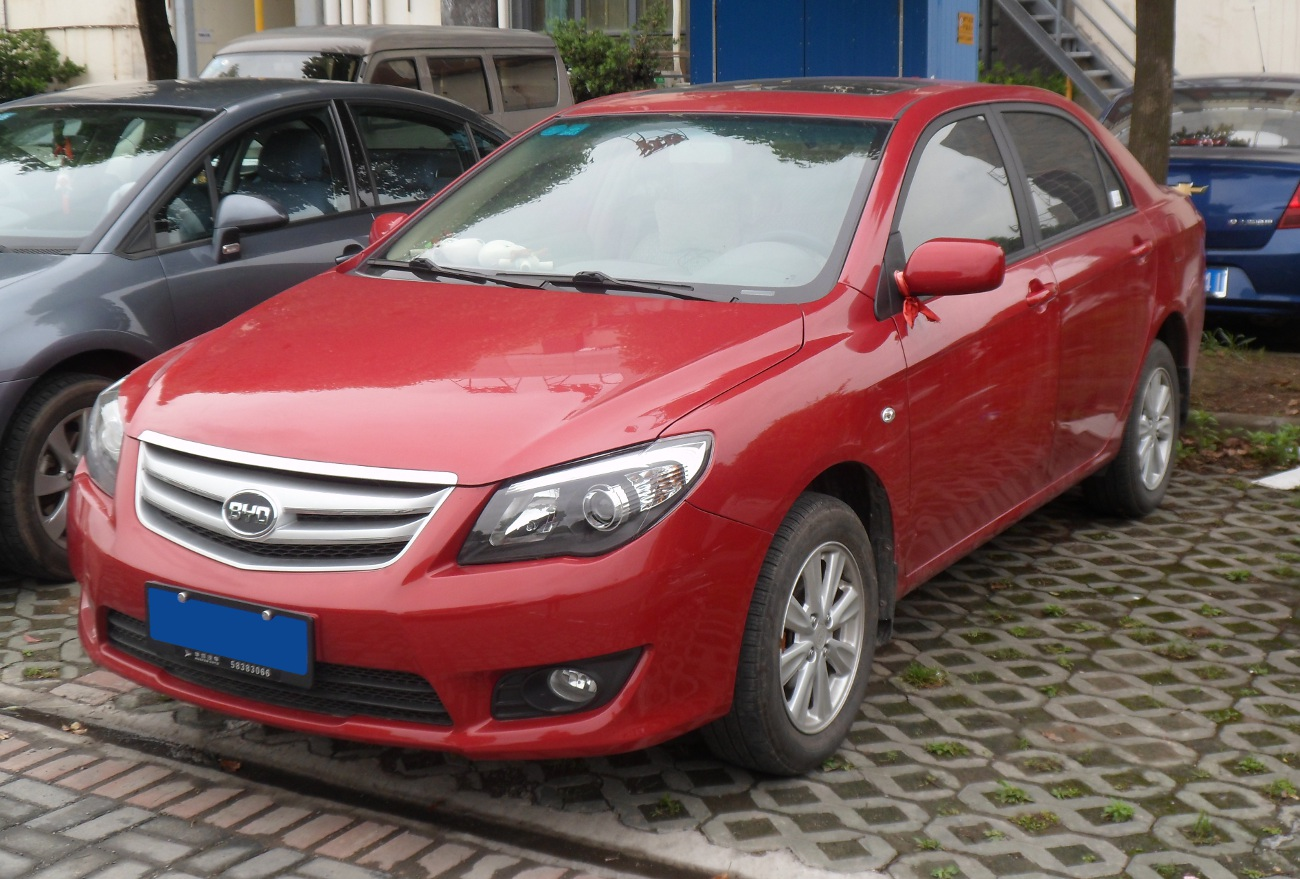
BYD L3 front.

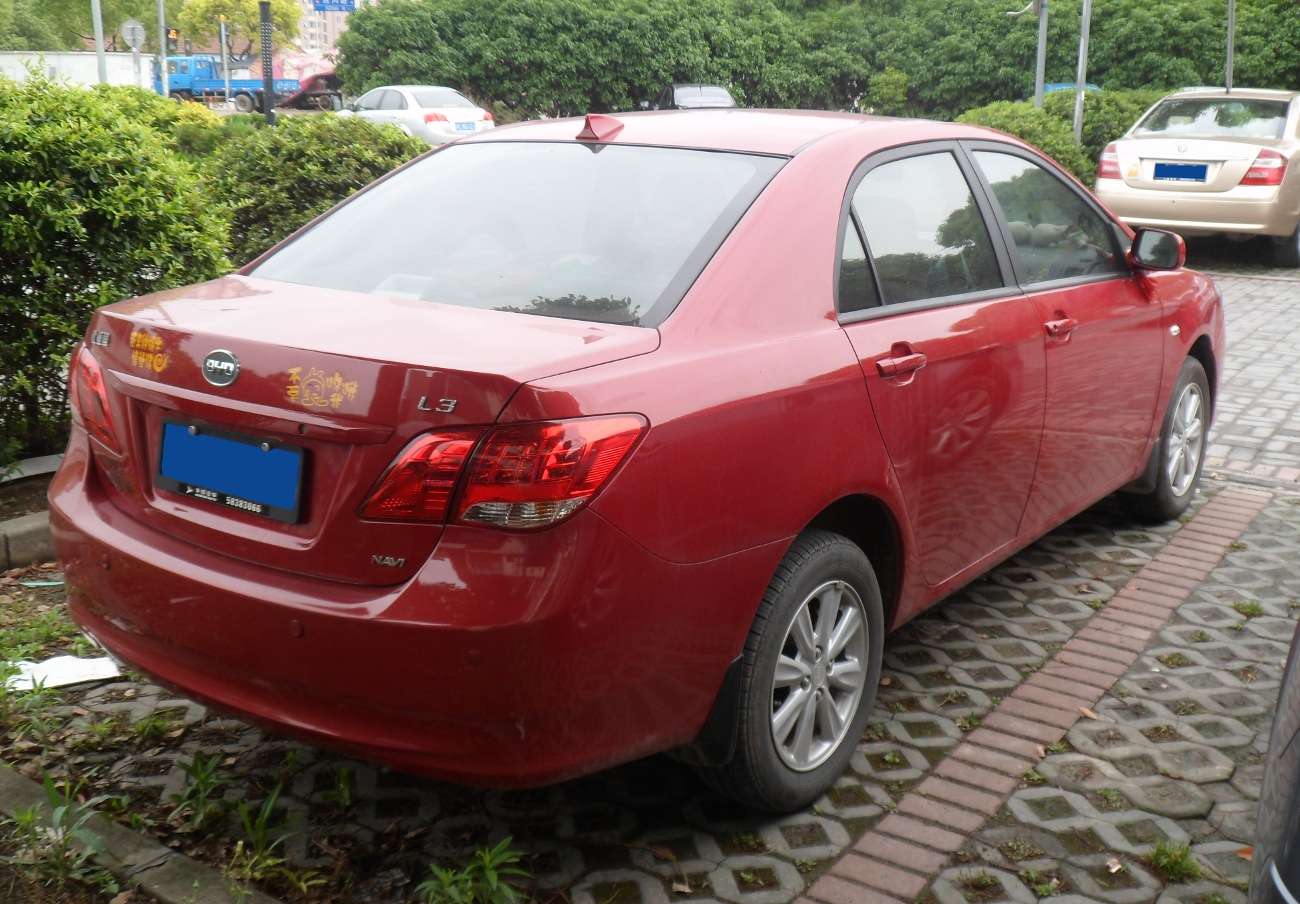
BYD L3 rear.

The BYD L3 in foreign markets received a facelift from 2016. The facelift was in fact the updated F3 in China.

2016–2020 BYD F3 MY2016 facelift sold as the new L3 in foreign markets

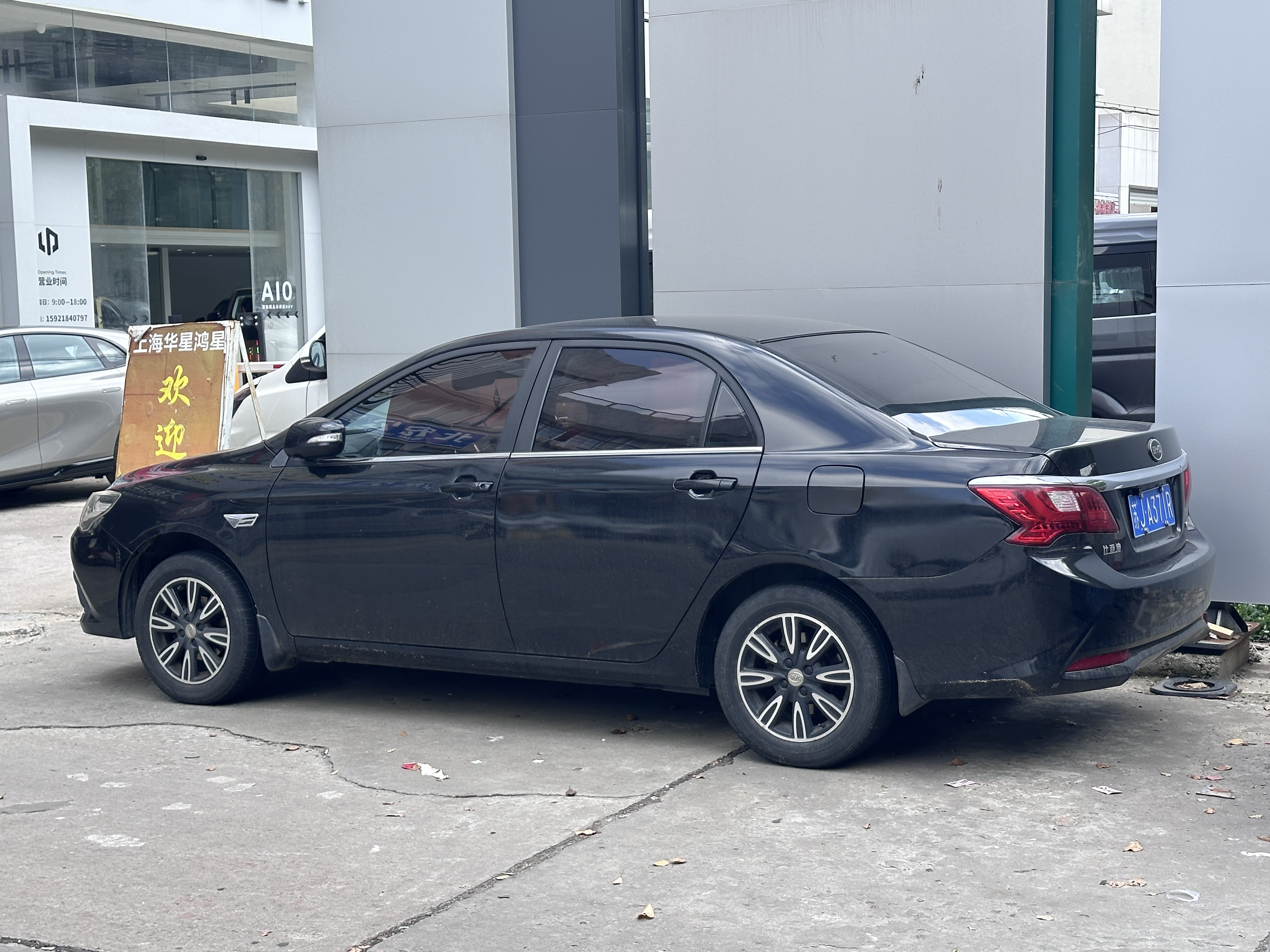
Rear view
