= BYD G3 =

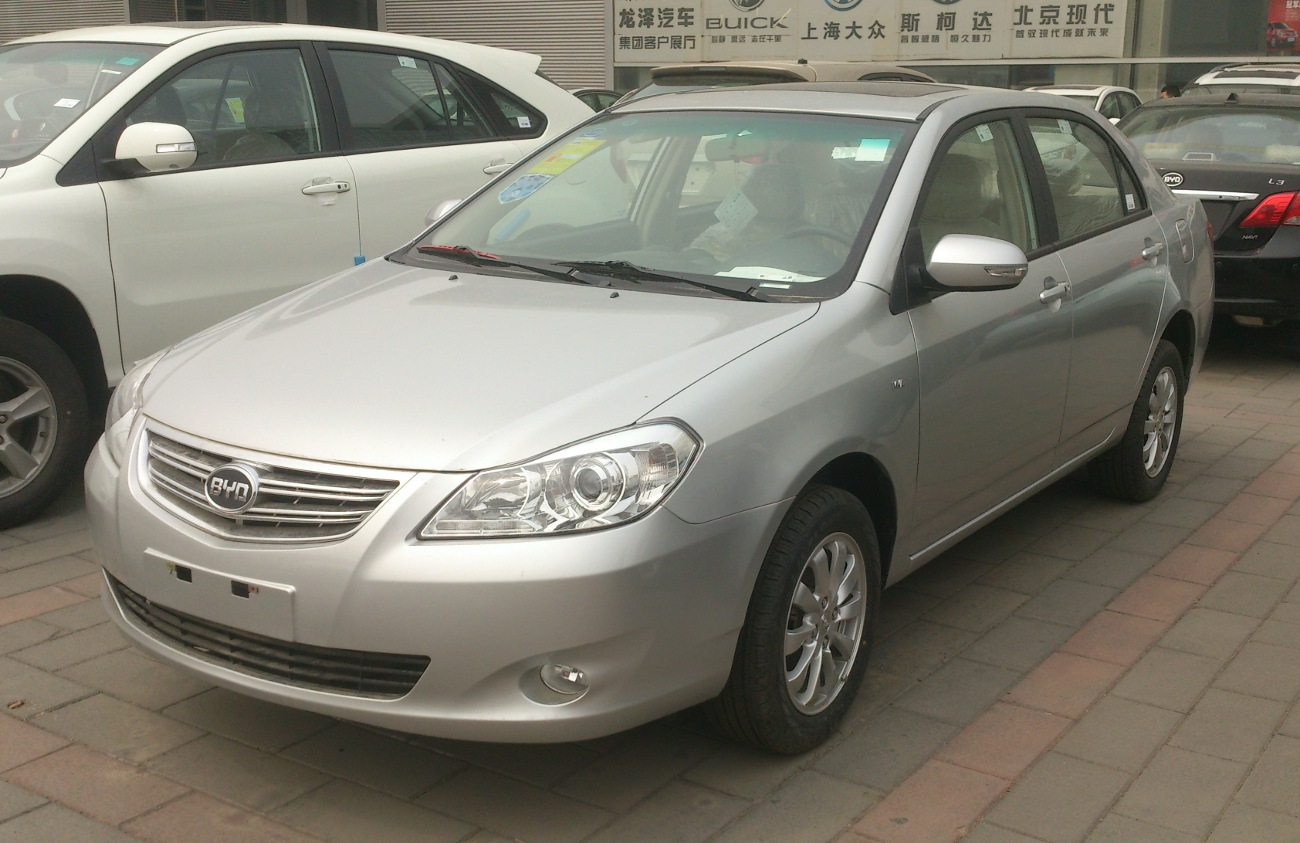

Overview
- Manufacturer: BYD
- Also called: BYD F3 (export)
- Production: 2009–2014
- Model years: 2010–2014

Body and chassis
- Class: Small family car
- Body style: 4-door Sedan; 5-door hatchback (G3R)
- Layout: Front-engine, front-wheel-drive layout
- Related: BYD L3; BYD F3; BYD F3DM; BYD Qin

Powertrain
- Engine: 1.5 L 4G15S I4 (2010); 1.5 L BYD473QB I4 (2010–2011); 1.5 L BYD473QE I4 (2012–2014); 1.8 L BYD483QA I4 (2010–2013)
- Transmission: 5-speed manual 6-speed DCT (2013 with BYD473QE engine); CVT (1.8 only)

Dimensions
- Wheelbase: 2,610 mm (102.8 in)
- Length: 4,600 mm (181.1 in)
- Width: 1,705 mm (67.1 in)
- Height: 1,490 mm (58.7 in)
- Kerb weight: 1,180–1,200 kg (2,600–2,650 lb)

Chronology
- Successor: BYD G5

The BYD G3 is a compact car by BYD. It is essentially an enlarged version of the BYD's compact car BYD F3, first introduced in October 2009.

== Overview ==
The BYD G3 aims for sales in China's "Tier 1" cities (Shanghai, Beijing, Guangzhou), hoping to target more sophisticated buyers than those who choose the F3. Production ended in 2014.

In China there is a very narrowly framed automotive hierarchy, leading to a habit of many manufacturers to offer stretched wheelbase version of much smaller cars than one would commonly find in the rest of the world. For instance, there is a China-only Audi A4L, and even the subcompact Tianjin Xiali has been available in a long-wheelbase version. The compact G3 continues this practice.

At an overall length of 4.6 m (15.1 ft), the G3 is about 7 cm (2.8 in) longer than the F3 sedan, with a wheelbase marginally longer by 1 cm (0.4 in). Also unique to the G3 is the availability of a larger 1.8 litre inline-four engine. The engines, beginning with a 1.5 litre "four", are all petrol-powered and offer between 78 and 90 kW (106 and 122 PS; 105 and 121 hp).

Equipment is also higher than for the corresponding F3; the G3 offers sat-nav, LED taillights, leather seats, and a remotely controlled central-locking system.

The G3 sold about 12,000 units in the first six months of 2010, which was less than one tenth as many as the combined results of the smaller F3 and F3-R.

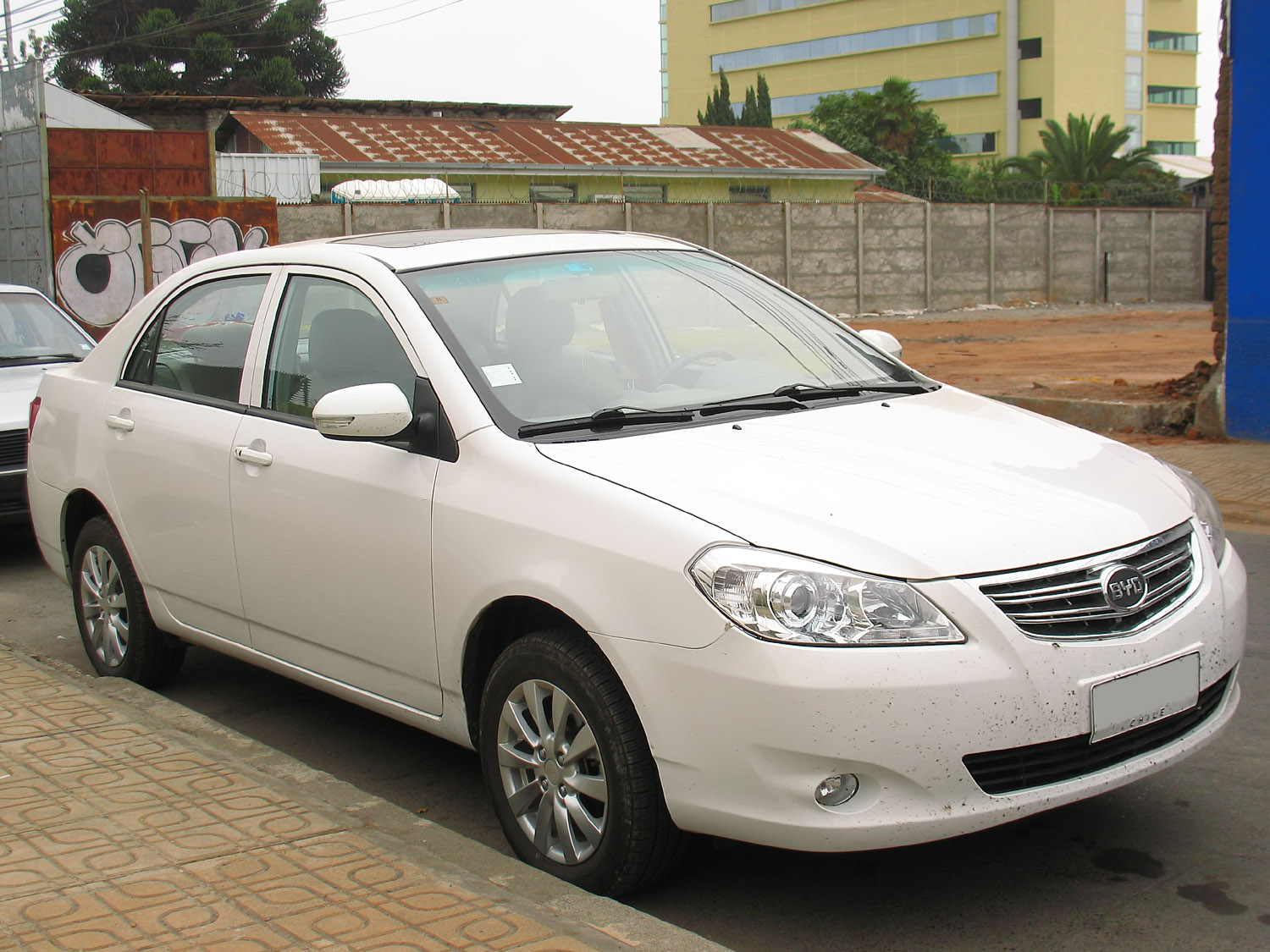
2012 BYD G3 1.5 GLXi.

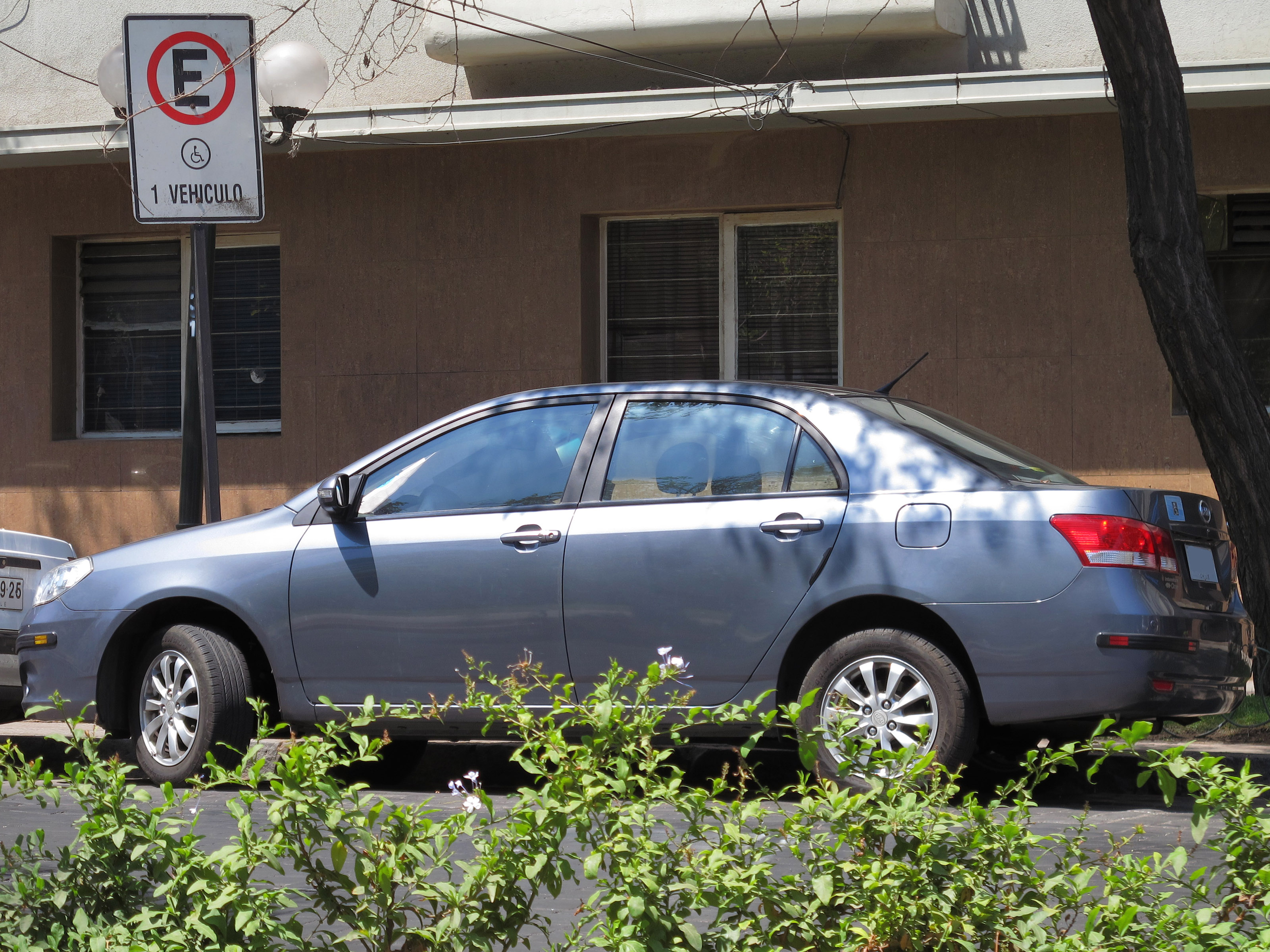
2012 BYD G3 1.5 GLXi side.

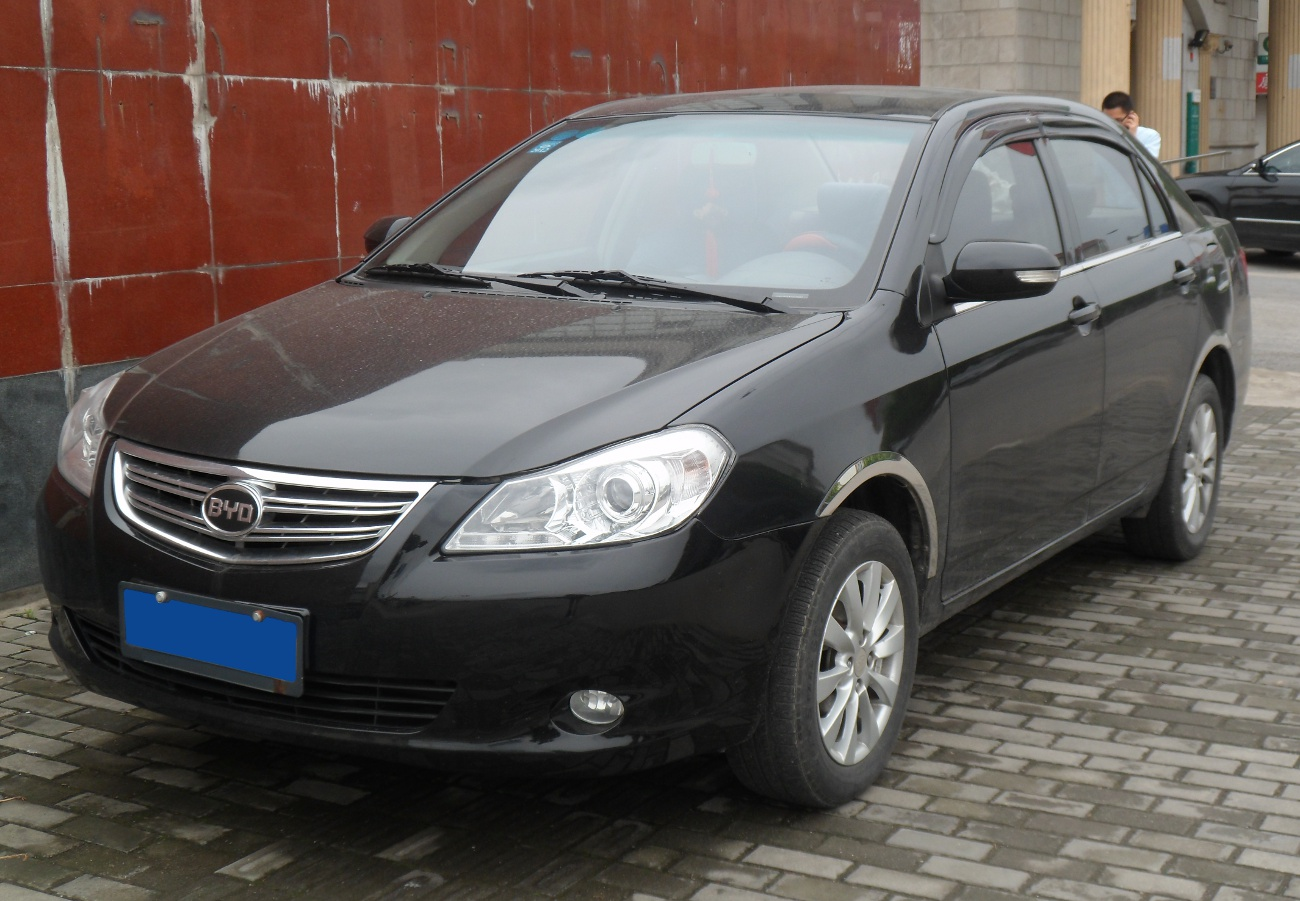
BYD G3 sedan front.

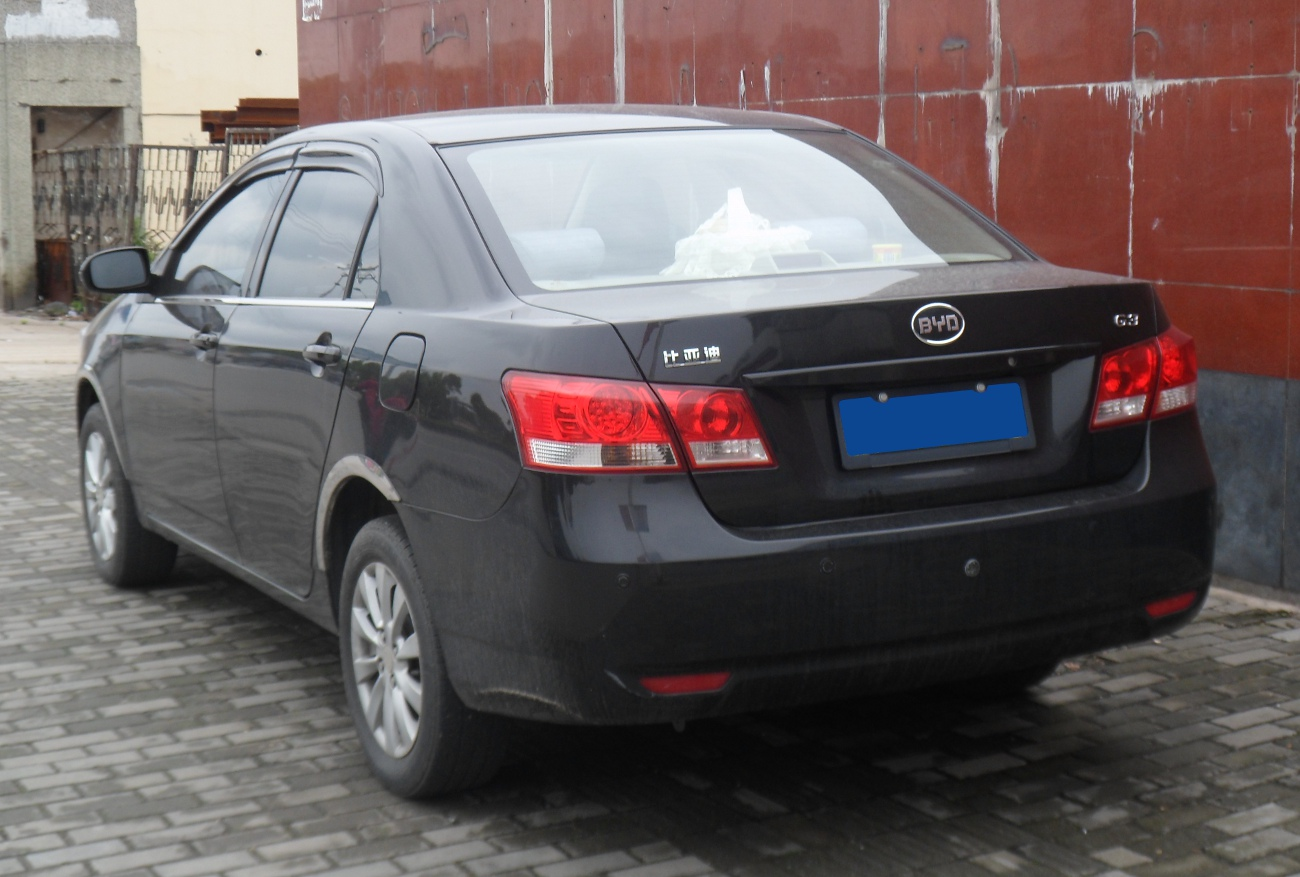
BYD G3 sedan rear.

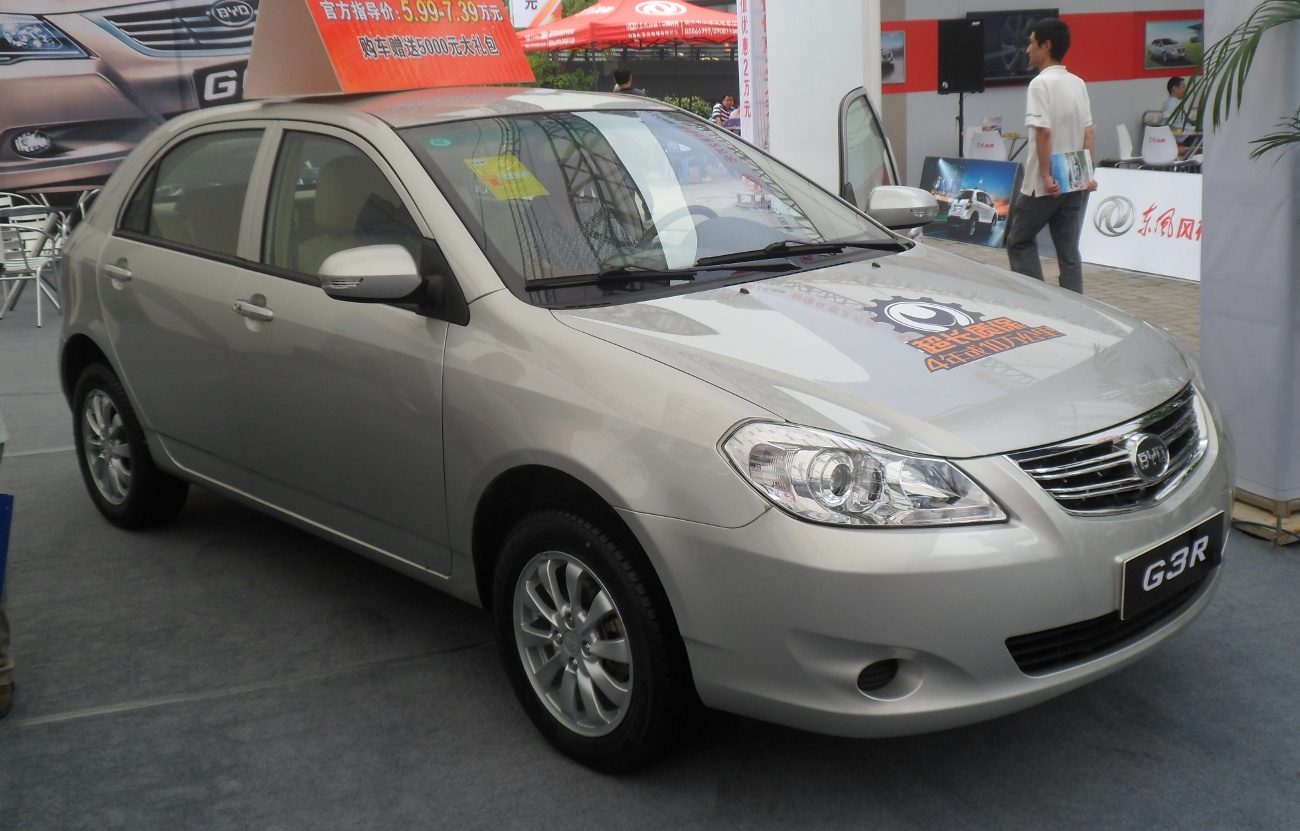
BYD G3R hatchback front.

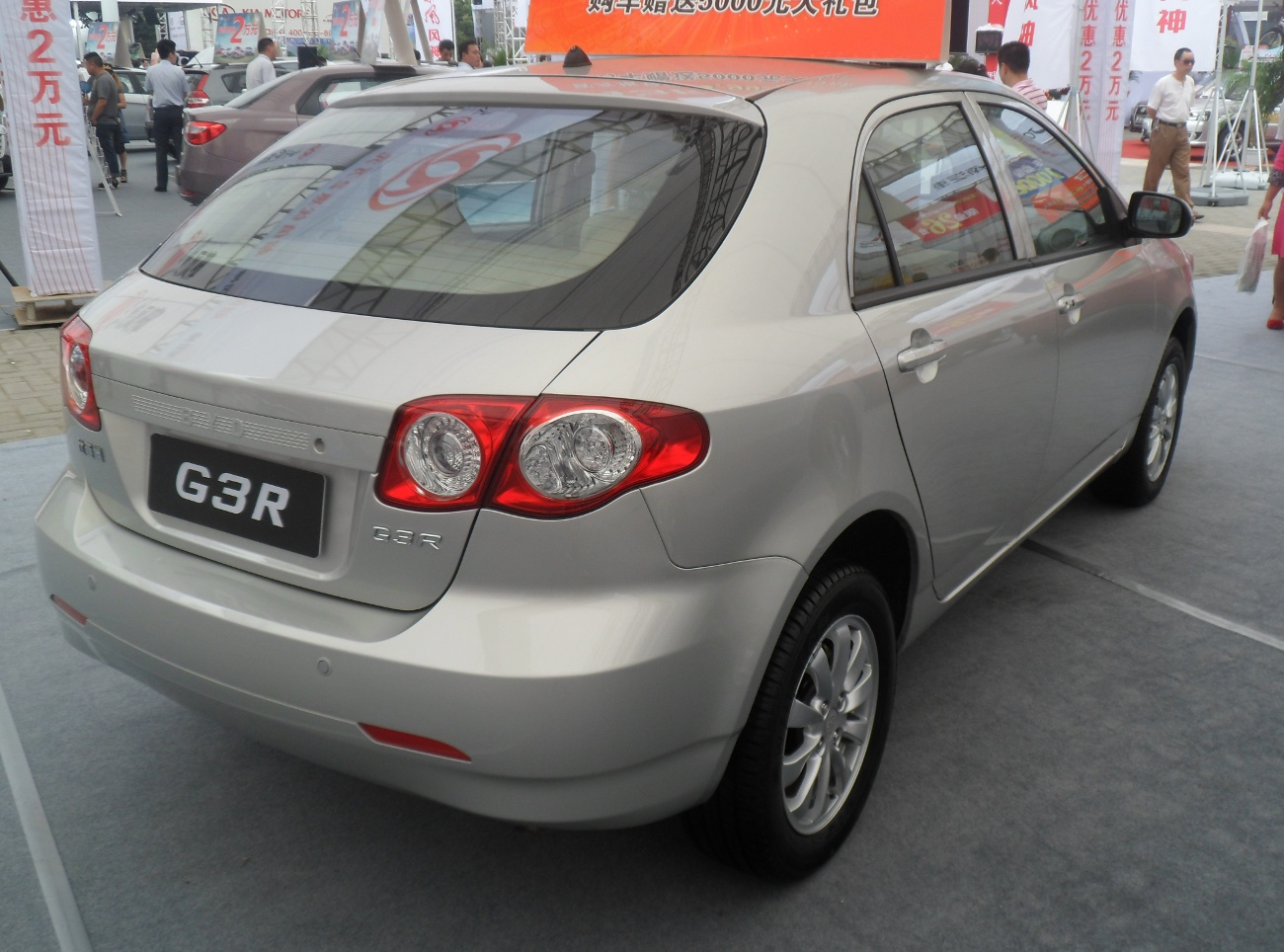
BYD G3R hatchback rear.
