= List of BYD Auto vehicles =

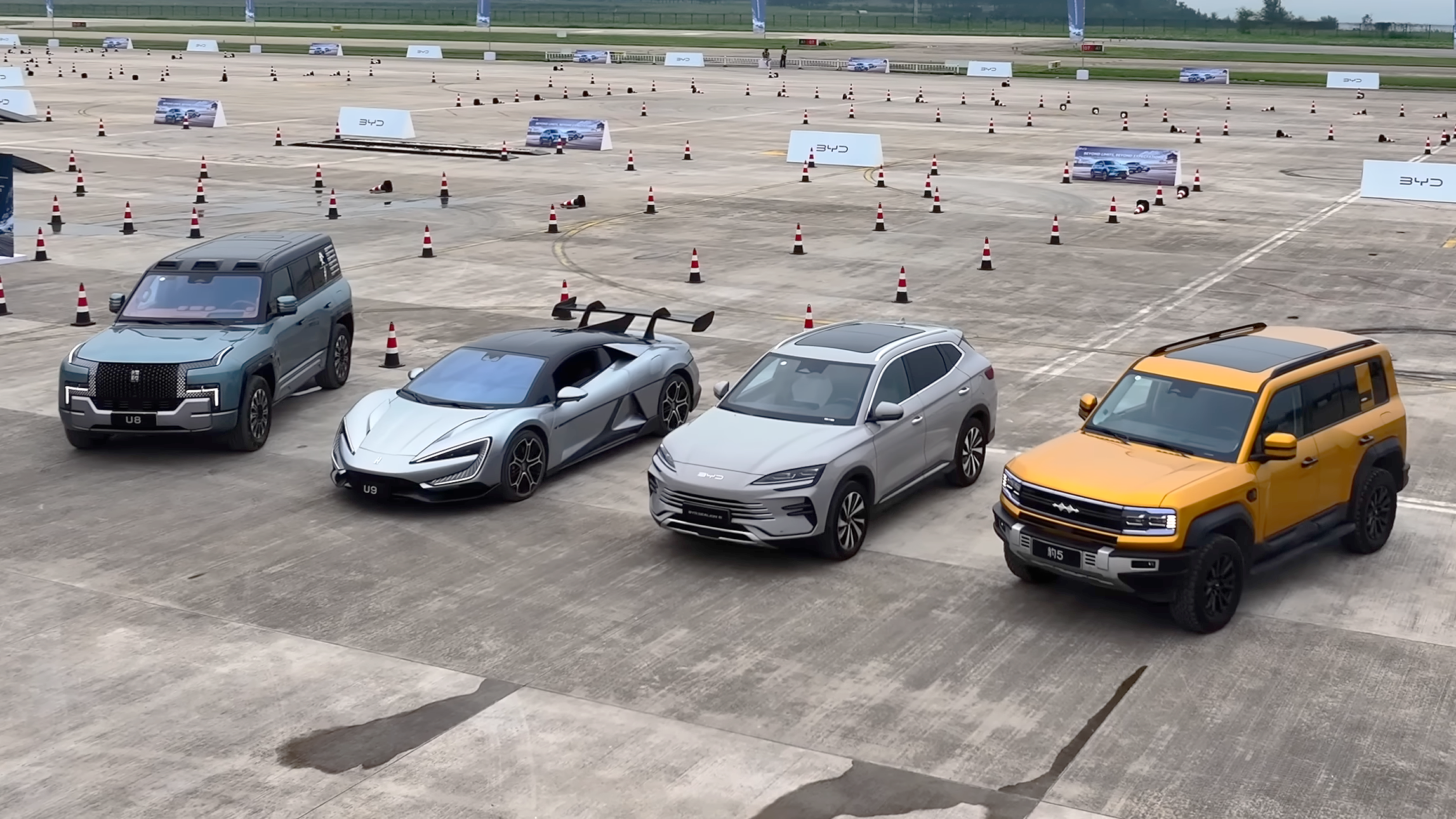
Four BYD Auto vehicles from three different brands: Yangwang U8, Yangwang U9, BYD Song Plus and Fangchengbao Bao 5

BYD Auto is a Chinese car manufacturer that produces a wide range of plug-in hybrid (PHEV) and battery electric (BEV) passenger cars, electric buses, electric trucks and other types of road vehicles. The company had formerly produced internal combustion engine (ICE) cars until 2022, when the company announced that it would focus on PHEVs and BEVs (collectively called "new energy vehicles" or NEVs in China).

The following is a list of vehicles produced by BYD, including vehicles that are marketed under the Denza, Yangwang, Fangchengbao and Linghui brands.

== Current passenger vehicles ==
Plug-in hybrid vehicles Battery electric vehicles Range extended electric vehicles

=== BYD brand ===
The BYD brand distinguishes their passenger car line-up under three "series", namely the Dynasty series (started by the BYD Qin in 2012), a line of higher-end vehicles with "dragon-inspired" designs aimed at the traditional mass markets; the Ocean series (started by the BYD Dolphin in 2021), a line of "ocean-themed" vehicles based on new aesthetic designs by Wolfgang Egger and the modular "e-Platform 3.0", aimed at younger buyers; and the "e" series, a line of fleet vehicles oriented at commercial sales such as ride-hailing and taxi. The Ocean series is further divided into series named after marine animals (Seagull, Dolphin, Seal and Sealion). Dynasty and Ocean series are offered through separate sales network, namely the Dynasty Network and the Ocean Network, and uses separate mobile apps for telematics.

The powertrain options consists of BEVs often denoted by the "EV" suffix, and PHEVs denoted by the "DM" (Dual Mode) suffix. The plug-in hybrids are further divided into the DM-i (for "intelligent") and DM-p (for "performance", for torque vectoring in all-wheel drive models) systems. The DM models are usually paired with a 1.5-litre petrol engine, naturally aspirated or turbocharged.

Body style	Model					Current generation			Vehicle description
Body style	Image	Name(s)	Chinese name	Export name	Series	Model code	Introduction (cal. year)	Facelift	Vehicle description
Sedan		Dahan EV	大汉EV	-	Dynasty	HSE	2026	-	BEV full-size sedan.
Sedan		Destroyer 05	驱逐舰05	Chazor; King; Seal 5 DM-i	Ocean	HA2H	2022	-	PHEV compact sedan, no longer sold in China.
Sedan		Han DM-i	汉DM-i	-	Dynasty	HCH	2020	2024	PHEV full-size sedan.
Sedan		Han EV	汉EV	Han	Dynasty	HCE	2020	2024	BEV full-size sedan.
Sedan		Han L DM	汉L DM	-	Dynasty	HC2H	2025	-	PHEV full-size sedan.
Sedan		Han L EV	汉L EV	-	Dynasty	HC2E	2025	-	BEV full-size sedan.
Sedan		Qin L DM-i	秦L DM-i	Seal 6 DM-i	Dynasty	HA3H	2024	-	PHEV mid-size sedan.
Sedan		Qin L EV	秦L EV	Seal 6 EV	Dynasty	EWE	2025	-	BEV mid-size sedan.
Sedan		Qin Max DM-i	秦MAX DM-i	-	Dynasty	EWH	2026	-	PHEV mid-size sedan.
Sedan		Qin Max EV	秦MAX EV	-	Dynasty	EWE	2026	-	BEV mid-size sedan.
Sedan		Qin Plus DM-i	秦PLUS DM-i	Qin Plus	Dynasty	HA5H	2021	2025	PHEV compact sedan.
Sedan		Qin Plus EV	秦PLUS EV	-	Dynasty	HA5E	2021	2025	BEV compact sedan.
Sedan		Qin Plus DM-i (2nd)	秦PLUS DM-i	-	Dynasty	HA3H	2026	-	PHEV mid-size sedan.
Sedan		Seal	海豹	Seal	Ocean	EKE	2022	-	BEV mid-size sedan, no longer sold in China.
Sedan		Seal 05 DM-i	海豹05 DM-i	Seal 5 DM-i; King	Ocean	HA6H	2025	-	PHEV compact sedan.
Sedan		Seal 06 DM-i	海豹06 DM-i	Seal 6 DM-i	Ocean	HKH	2024	-	PHEV mid-size sedan.
Sedan		Seal 06 DM-i (2nd)	海豹06 DM-i	-	Ocean	EUH	2026	-	PHEV mid-size sedan.
Sedan		Seal 06 EV	海豹06 EV	-	Ocean	EUE	2025	2026	BEV mid-size sedan.
Sedan		Seal 07 DM-i	海豹07 DM-i	Seal 7 DM-i	Ocean	HXH	2023	2025	PHEV full-size sedan, previously Seal DM-i.
Sedan		Seal 07 EV	海豹07 EV	-	Ocean	HXE	2026	-	BEV full-size sedan.
Sedan		Seal 07 DM-i (2nd)	海豹07 DM-i		Ocean		2026	-	PHEV full-size sedan.
Sedan		Seal 07 EV (2nd)	海豹07 EV	-	Ocean		2026	-	BEV full-size sedan.
Sedan		Seal 08 DM-i	海豹08 DM-i	-	Ocean	HYH	2026	-	PHEV full-size sedan.
Sedan		Seal 08 EV	海豹08 EV	-	Ocean	HYE	2026	-	BEV full-size sedan.
Station wagon		Seal 06 DM-i Touring	海豹06 DM-i旅行版	Seal 6 DM-i Touring	Ocean	HKH	2025	-	PHEV mid-size wagon.
Hatchback		Dolphin	海豚	Dolphin; E2	Ocean	EM2E	2021	2025	BEV compact hatchback.
Hatchback		Dolphin G DM-i	-	Dolphin G DM-i	-	CNH	2026	-	PHEV compact hatchback.
Hatchback		e2	e2	e2	e (Ocean)	EL	2019	2023	BEV compact hatchback, the hatchback version of the e3.
Hatchback		Seagull (1st)	海鸥	Seagull; Dolphin Mini; Dolphin Surf; Atto 1	Ocean	EQE	2023	2025	BEV city car.
Hatchback		Seagull (2nd)	海鸥	-	Ocean	CQE	2026	-	BEV Supermini.
Hatchback		Seal 06 GT	海豹06 GT	-	Ocean	EHE	2024	-	BEV mid-size hatchback.
Kei car		Racco	-	Racco	-	CKE	2026	-	BEV kei car with rear sliding doors.
Crossover SUV		Datang DM	大唐DM	-	Dynasty	ST2H	2026	-	PHEV full-size crossover SUV.
Crossover SUV		Datang EV	大唐EV	-	Dynasty	ST2E	2026	-	BEV full-size crossover SUV.
Crossover SUV		Sealion 05 DM-i (2nd)	海狮05 DM-i	-	Ocean	UNH	2026	-	PHEV compact crossover SUV.
Crossover SUV		Sealion 05 EV	海狮05 EV	-	Ocean	UNE	2025	2026	BEV compact crossover SUV.
Crossover SUV		Sealion 06 DM-i	海狮06 DM-i	-	Ocean	SHH	2025	-	PHEV mid-size crossover SUV.
Crossover SUV		Sealion 06 EV	海狮06 EV	Song Plus	Ocean	UGE/SHE	2025	-	BEV mid-size crossover SUV.
Crossover SUV		Sealion 07 EV	海狮07 EV	Sealion 7	Ocean	UKE	2024	-	BEV mid-size crossover SUV, no longer sold in China.
Crossover SUV		Sealion 08 DM-i	海狮08 DM-i	-	Ocean	SYH	2026	-	PHEV full-size crossover SUV.
Crossover SUV		Sealion 08 EV	海狮08 EV	-	Ocean	SYE	2026	-	BEV full-size crossover SUV.
Crossover SUV		Song L DM-i	宋L DM-i	-	Dynasty	SA5H	2024	-	PHEV mid-size crossover SUV.
Crossover SUV		Song L EV	宋L EV	-	Dynasty	UFE	2023	-	BEV mid-size crossover SUV.
Crossover SUV		Song Ultra DM-i	宋Ultra DM-i	-	Dynasty	SA5H	2026	-	PHEV mid-size crossover SUV.
Crossover SUV		Song Ultra EV	宋Ultra EV	-	Dynasty	SA5E	2026	-	BEV mid-size crossover SUV.
Crossover SUV		Song Plus DM-i	宋PLUS DM-i	Seal U DM-i; Sealion 6 DM-i	Ocean (Note: Marketed through Ocean Network dealerships since 2022 in China.)	SA3H	2020	2023	PHEV compact crossover SUV, no longer sold in China.
Crossover SUV		Song Plus EV	宋PLUS EV	Seal U EV	Ocean	SA3E	2020	2023	BEV compact crossover SUV, no longer sold in China.
Crossover SUV		Song Pro	宋Pro DM-i	Song Pro; Sealion 5 DM-i	Dynasty	SA6H	2019	2024	PHEV compact crossover SUV.
Crossover SUV		Tang DM-i	唐DM-i	Tang DM-i	Dynasty	STH	2018	2024	PHEV mid-size crossover SUV.
Crossover SUV		Tang EV	唐EV	Tang; Tan; Sealion 8	Dynasty	STE	2018	2022	BEV mid-size crossover SUV, no longer sold in China.
Crossover SUV		Tang EV (3rd)	唐EV		Dynasty		2026	-	BEV mid-size crossover SUV.
Crossover SUV		Tang L DM	唐L DM	Sealion 8 DM-i; Atto 8	Dynasty	SRH	2025	-	PHEV mid-size crossover SUV.
Crossover SUV		Tang L EV	唐L EV	-	Dynasty	SRE	2025	-	BEV mid-size crossover SUV.
Crossover SUV		Ti 7	-	Ti 7; Titan 7	-	QZH	2026	-	PHEV mid-size SUV, rebadged Fangchengbao Ti7 for export.
Crossover SUV		Yuan Plus (1st)	元PLUS	Atto 3; Yuan Plus	Dynasty	SC2E	2022	2025	BEV compact crossover SUV.
Crossover SUV		Yuan Plus (2nd)	元PLUS	Atto 5	Dynasty	SC6E	2026	-	BEV compact crossover SUV.
Crossover SUV		Yuan Up	-	Atto 2 DM-i; Yuan Up DM-i; Yuan Pro DM-i	Dynasty	SC3H	2025	-	PHEV subcompact crossover SUV.
Crossover SUV		Yuan Up	元UP	Atto 2; Yuan Up; Yuan Pro; S1 Pro	Dynasty	SC3E	2024	-	BEV subcompact crossover SUV.
MPV/ minivan		e6	e6	e6	e (Ocean)	MEE	2021	-	BEV compact MPV for taxi use, based on the Song Max.
MPV/ minivan		M6 DM	-	M6 DM	-	MEH	2026	-	PHEV three-row compact MPV based on the Song Max.
MPV/ minivan		M6 EV	-	M6 EV; eMax 7	-	MEE	2024	-	BEV three-row compact MPV based on the e6 and Song Max.
MPV/ minivan		Xia	夏	M9; eMax 9 DM-i	Dynasty	MCH	2024	-	PHEV MPV/minivan.
Pickup truck		Mako	-	Mako	-		Upcoming	-	PHEV four-door unibody pickup truck.
Pickup truck		Shark 6	-	Shark 6; Shark	-	PAH	2024	-	PHEV four-door body-on-frame pickup truck.

=== Linghui ===
Body style	Model			Current generation		Vehicle description
Body style	Image	Name(s)	Chinese name	Introduction (cal. year)	Facelift	Vehicle description
Sedan		e5	领汇e5	Upcoming	-	BEV compact sedan based on the Qin Plus EV.
Sedan		e7	领汇e7	2026	-	BEV mid-size sedan.
Sedan		e9	领汇e9	2026	-	BEV full-size sedan based on the Han EV.
MPV/ minivan		M9	领汇M9	2026	-	PHEV MPV/minivan based on the Xia.

=== Denza ===
Body style	Model				Current generation		Vehicle description
Body style	Image	Name(s)	Chinese name	Model code	Introduction (cal. year)	Facelift	Vehicle description
Sedan		Z9S	腾势Z9S	EZE	2026	-	BEV full-size 4-door sedan.
Station wagon		Z9 GT PHEV	腾势Z9 GT插混	HTH	2024	-	PHEV full-size 5-door shooting brake.
Station wagon		Z9 GT EV	腾势Z9 GT纯电	HTE	2024	-	BEV full-size 5-door shooting brake.
Coupe/ convertible		Z Coupe	腾势Z硬頂	EXE	2026	-	BEV coupe.
Coupe/ convertible		Z Spider	腾势Z敞篷	EXE	2026	-	BEV convertible.
Body-on-frame SUV		B5	-	SFH	2025	-	PHEV mid-size SUV, rebadged Fangchengbao Bao 5 for export.
Body-on-frame SUV		B8	-	SQH	2025	-	PHEV full-size SUV, rebadged Fangchengbao Bao 8 for export.
Crossover SUV		B3	-	URE	2026	-	BEV compact SUV, rebadged Fangchengbao Tai 3 for export.
Crossover SUV		N8 PHEV	腾势N8插混	SNH	2026	-	PHEV full-size SUV.
Crossover SUV		N8 EV	腾势N8纯电	SNE	2026	-	BEV full-size SUV.
Crossover SUV		N8L PHEV	腾势N8L插混	SNH	2025	-	PHEV full-size SUV.
Crossover SUV		N8L EV	腾势N8L纯电	SNE	2026	-	BEV full-size SUV.
Crossover SUV		N9	腾势N9	SZH	2024	-	PHEV full-size SUV.
MPV/ minivan		D9 DM-i	腾势D9插混	MRH	2022	2026	PHEV MPV/minivan.
MPV/ minivan		D9 EV	腾势D9纯电	MRE	2022	2026	BEV MPV/minivan.

=== Yangwang ===
Body style	Model			Current generation			Vehicle description
Body style	Image	Name(s)	Chinese name	Model code	Introduction (cal. year)	Facelift	Vehicle description
Sedan		Altior	仰望鼎耀	HU	Upcoming	-	full-size luxury sedan.
Sedan		U7 PHEV	仰望U7 PHEV	ESH	2024	-	PHEV full-size luxury sedan.
Sedan		U7 EV	仰望U7 EV	ESE	2024	-	BEV full-size luxury sedan.
SUV		U8	仰望U8	SGH	2023	-	Range extended electric full-size luxury SUV.
SUV		U8L	仰望U8L	SGH	2025	-	Range extended electric full-size luxury SUV, LWB variant of U8.
Sports car		U9	仰望U9	ERE	2023	-	BEV supercar.

=== Fangchengbao ===
Body style	Model			Current generation			Vehicle description
Body style	Image	Name(s)	Chinese name	Model code	Introduction (cal. year)	Facelift	Vehicle description
Sedan		Formula S	方程S	HBE	2026	-	BEV full-size sedan.
Sedan		Formula SL	方程SL		Upcoming	-	BEV full-size sedan.
Station wagon		Formula S GT	方程S GT	HBE	2026	-	BEV full-size station wagon.
SUV		Bao 5	豹5	SFH	2023	-	PHEV mid-size SUV.
SUV		Bao 8	豹8	SQH	2024	-	PHEV full-size SUV.
SUV		Tai 3	鈦3	URE	2025	-	BEV compact SUV.
SUV		Ti7	鈦7	QZH	2025	-	PHEV mid-size SUV.
SUV		Ti7	鈦7	QZE	2026	-	BEV mid-size SUV.
SUV		Ti9	鈦9		2026	-	PHEV full-size SUV.
Pickup truck		Shark	鲨鱼	PAH	2026	-	PHEV four-door body-on-frame pickup truck

== Discontinued passenger vehicles ==
=== BYD brand ===
Body style	Image	Name(s)	Chinese name	Introduction (cal. year)	Discontinued (cal. year)	Vehicle description	
Sedan		e3	e3	2019	2022	Vehicle description	Compact sedan, BEV
Sedan		e5	e5	2015	2020	Compact sedan, BEV	
Sedan		F3	F3	2005	2021	Compact sedan, the sedan version of the F3R.	
Sedan		F3DM	F3DM	2008	2013	Compact sedan, PHEV.	
Sedan		F6	F6	2008	2012	Mid-size sedan.	
Sedan		G3	G3	2009	2014	Compact sedan, the sedan version of the G3R.	
Sedan		G5	G5	2014	2017	Compact sedan.	
Sedan		G6	G6	2011	2018	Mid-size sedan.	
Sedan		L3 / New F3	L3	2010	2015	Compact sedan.	
Sedan		Qin	秦	2012	2024	Compact sedan, ICE/PHEV/BEV.	
Sedan		Qin Pro	秦Pro	2018	2021	Compact sedan, ICE/PHEV/BEV.	
Sedan		Sirui	思锐	2013	2014	Mid-size sedan.	
Sedan		Surui	速锐	2012	2019	Compact sedan.	
Coupe		S8	S8	2009	2010	Compact sports car.	
Hatchback		e1	e1	2019	2020	City car, BEV.	
Hatchback		F0	F0	2008	2015	City car.	
Hatchback		Flyer	福莱尔	2005	2008	City car.	
Hatchback		F3R	F3R	2005	2014	Compact hatchback, the hatchback version of the F3.	
Hatchback		G3R	G3R	2009	2014	Compact hatchback, the hatchback version of the G3.	
Crossover SUV		Frigate 07	护卫舰07	2022	2025	Mid-size crossover SUV, PHEV.	
Crossover SUV		S1	S1	2015	2016	Subcompact crossover SUV.	
Crossover SUV		S2	S2	2019	2022	Subcompact crossover SUV, BEV.	
Crossover SUV		S6	S6	2011	2016	Mid-size crossover SUV.	
Crossover SUV		S7	S7	2014	2018	Mid-size crossover SUV.	
Crossover SUV		Sealion 05 DM-i (1st)	海狮05 DM-i	2024	2026	Compact crossover SUV, PHEV.	
Crossover SUV		Sealion 07 DM-i	海狮07 DM-i	2025	2026	Mid-size crossover SUV, PHEV.	
Crossover SUV		Song	宋	2015	2022	Compact crossover SUV.	
Crossover SUV		Tang	唐	2015	2018	Mid-size crossover SUV.	
Crossover SUV		Yuan	元	2016	2024	Compact crossover SUV, ICE/BEV.	
MPV/ minivan		D1	D1	2020	2023	BEV two-row compact MPV purpose-built for ride-hailing services DiDi.	
MPV/ minivan		e6 (2009)	e6	2009	2021	Compact MPV/minivan, BEV.	
MPV/ minivan		M6 (2010)	M6	2010	2017	Compact MPV/minivan.	
MPV/ minivan		Song Max	宋MAX	2017	2024	Three-row compact MPV, ICE/PHEV/BEV.	

=== Denza ===
Body style	Image	Name(s)	Chinese name	Introduction (cal. year)	Discontinued	Vehicle description	
Sedan		Z9	腾势Z9	2024	2026	Vehicle description	BEV/PHEV Full-size 4-door sedan.
Hatchback		400 / 500 / EV	腾势400/500/EV	2014	2019	Compact hatchback, BEV.	
Crossover SUV		X	腾势X	2019	2021	Mid-size crossover SUV, PHEV/BEV.	
Crossover SUV		N7	腾势N7	2023	2026	Mid-size SUV, BEV.	

== Concept vehicles ==
- 2004 BYD ET
- 2004 BYD EF3
- 2013 Denza EV Concept (previewing the Denza EV)
- 2017 BYD Dynasty (previewing the second-generation BYD Tang)
- 2018 BYD E-Seed
- 2019 Denza Concept X (previewing the Denza X)
- 2019 BYD E-Seed GT (previewing the BYD Han)
- 2021 BYD EA1 (previewing the BYD Dolphin)
- 2021 BYD X Dream (previewing the BYD Frigate 07)
- 2021 BYD Ocean X (previewing the BYD Seal)
- 2022 Denza Inception (previewing the Denza N7)
- 2023 BYD Song L (previewing the BYD Song L EV)
- 2023 Fangchengbao Super 8 (previewing the Fangchengbao Bao 8)
- 2024 BYD Ocean-M (previewing the BYD Seal 06 GT)
- 2024 Fangchengbao Super 3 (previewing the Fangchengbao Tai 3)
- 2024 Fangchengbao Super 9 (previewing the Denza Z)
- 2025 BYD Dynasty-D (previewing the BYD Datang)
- 2025 BYD Ocean-S (previewing the BYD Seal 08)
- 2025 Denza Z
- 2026 BYD Ocean-V
- 2026 Fangchengbao Formula X
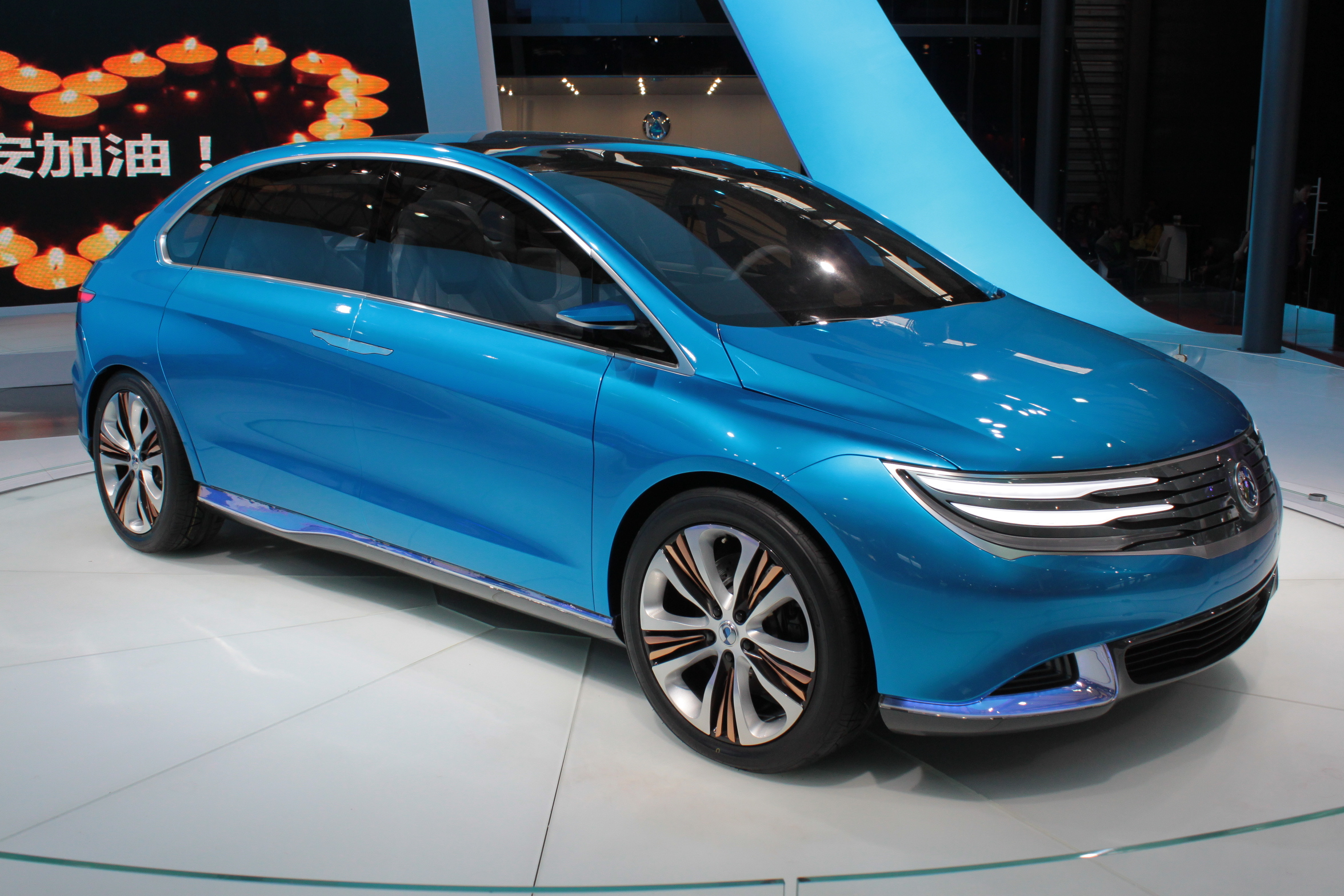
Denza concept (2013)

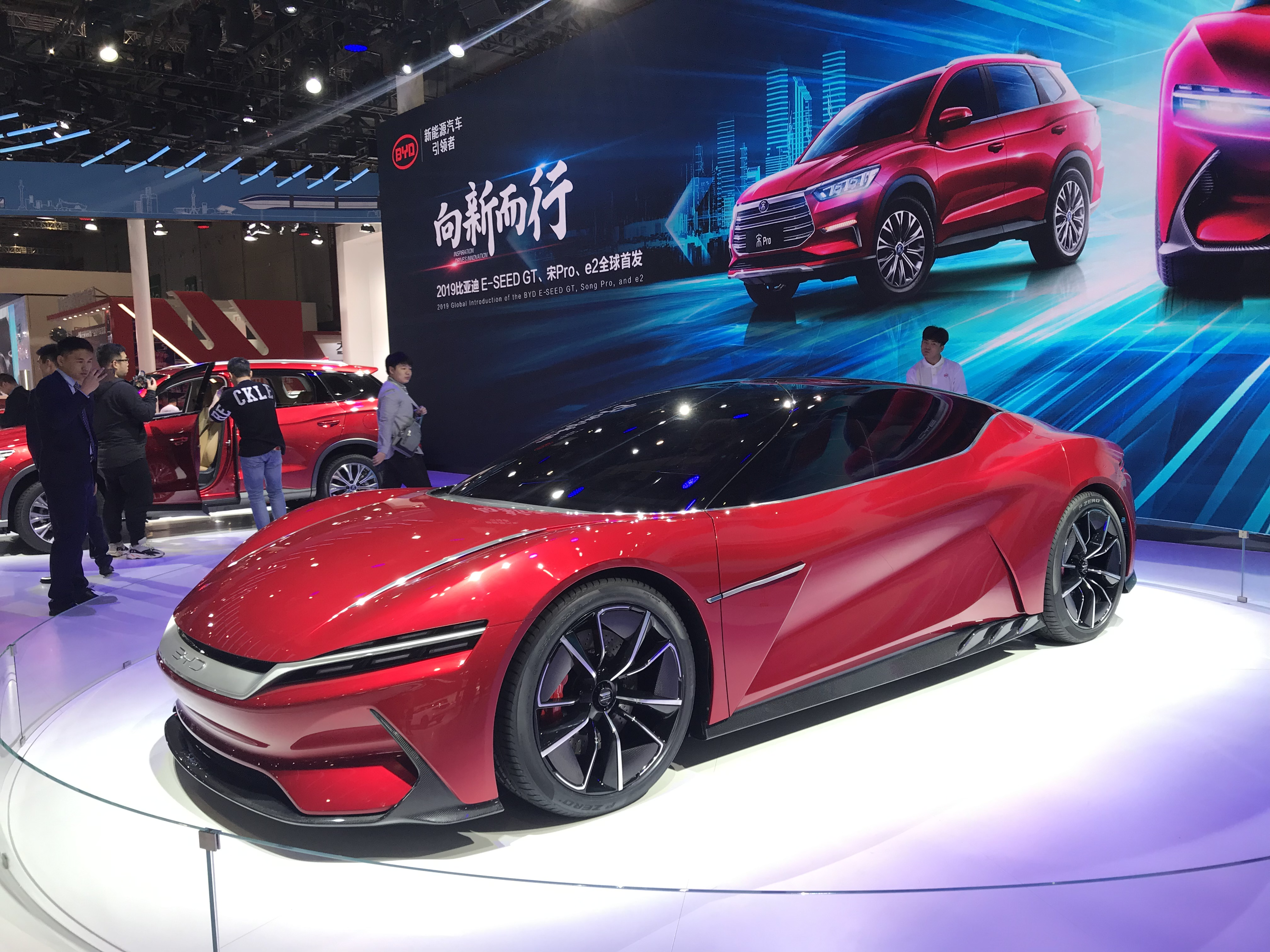
BYD E-Seed GT (2019)

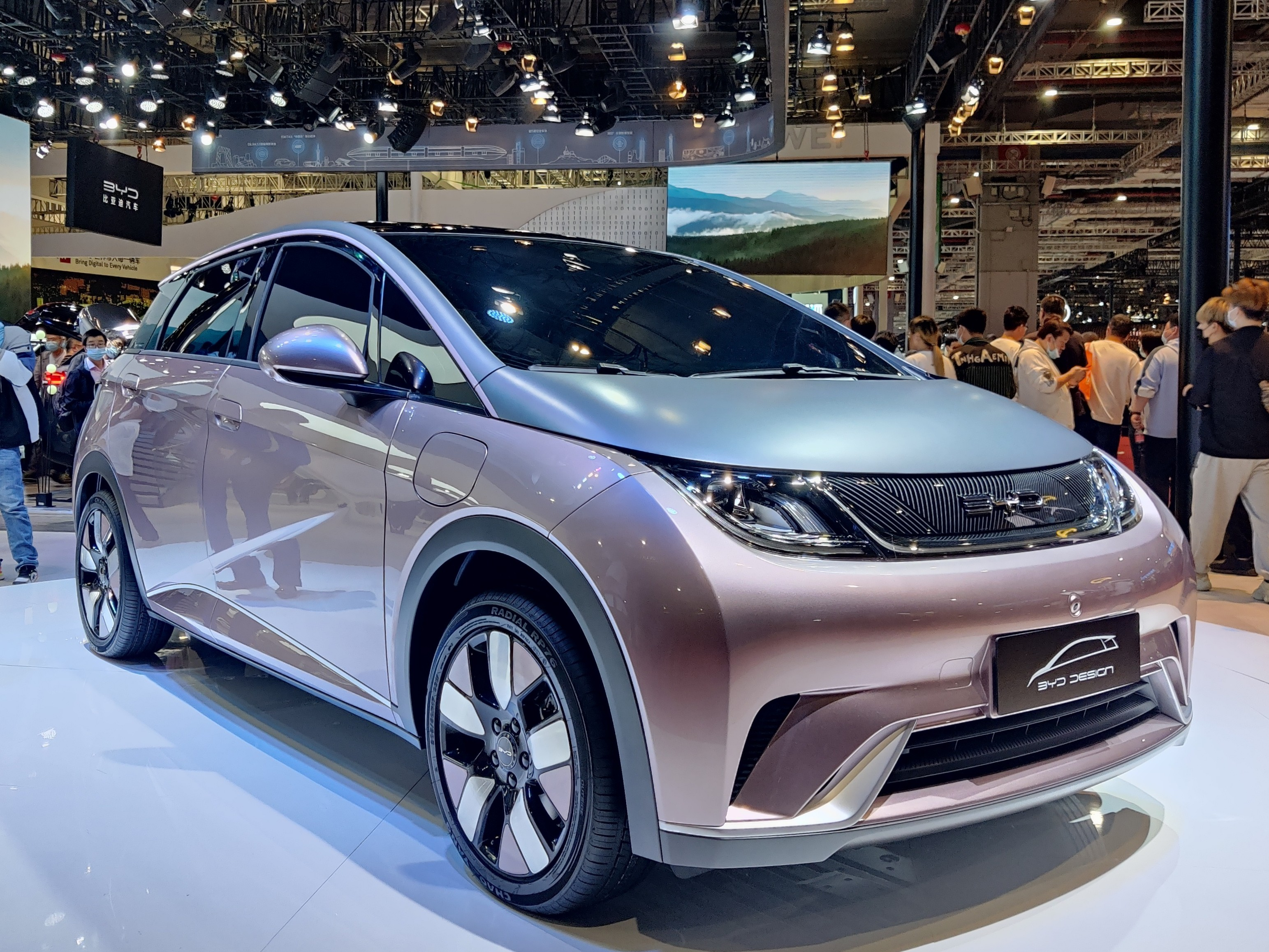
BYD EA1 (2021)

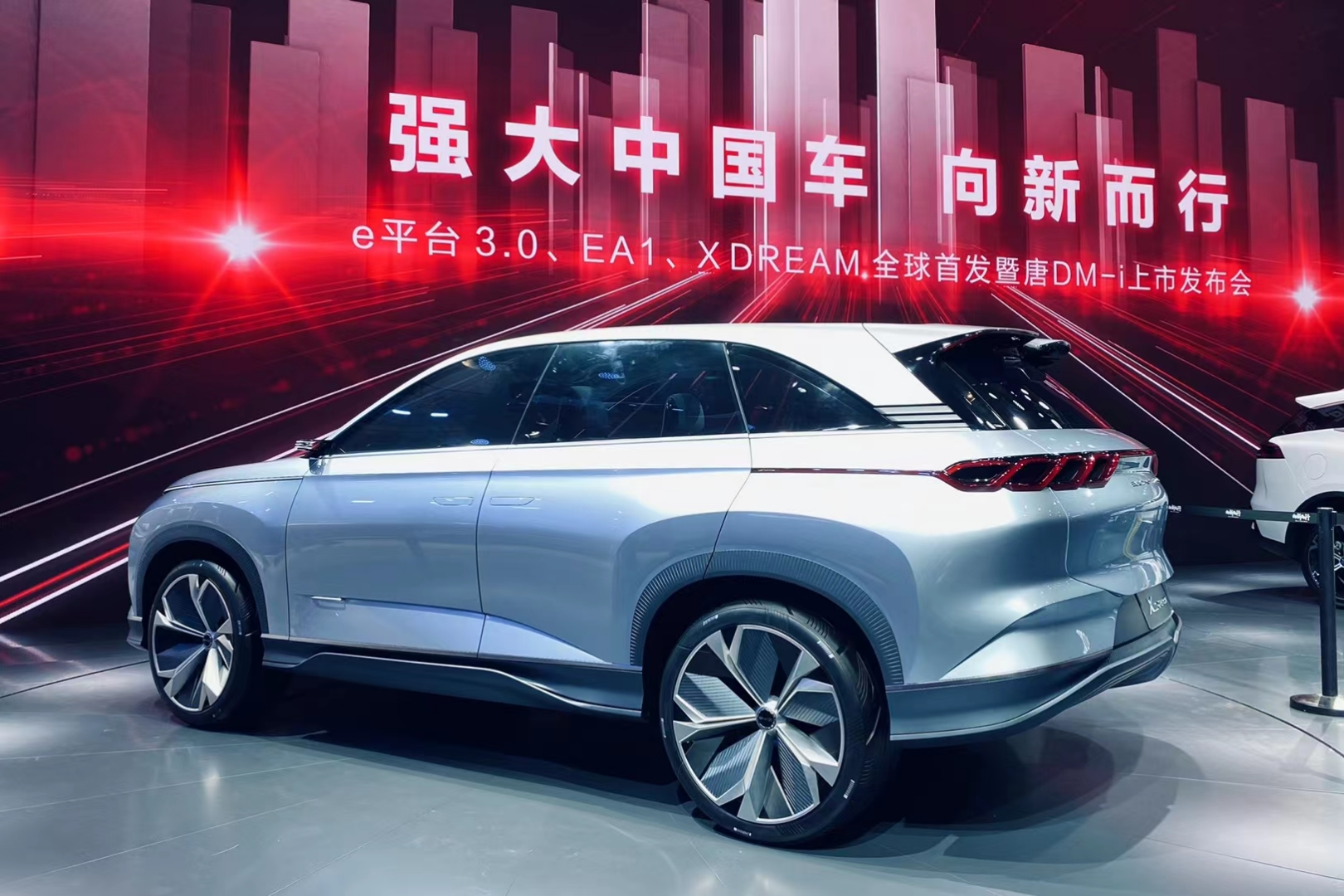
BYD X-Dream (2021)

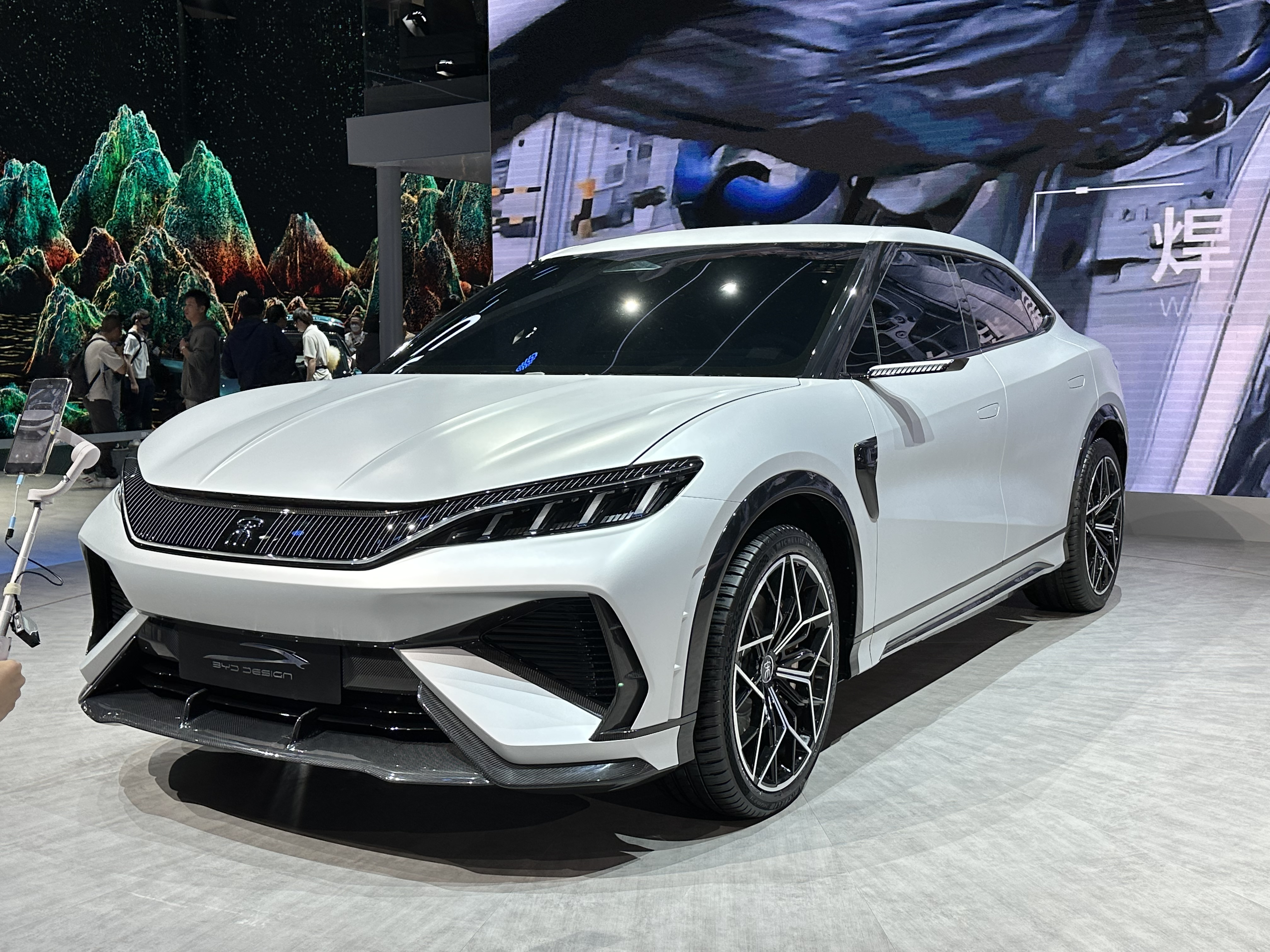
BYD Song L (2023)

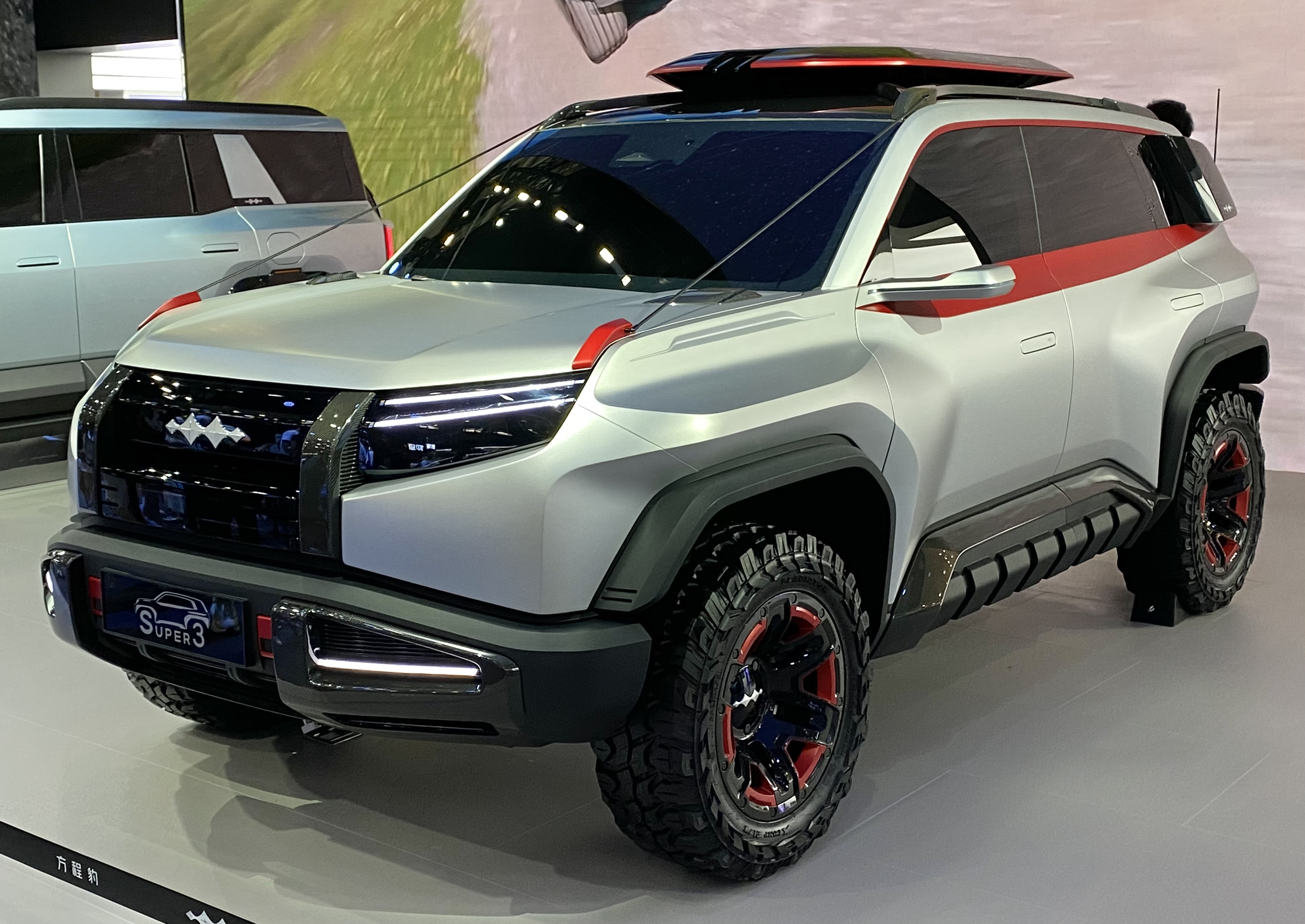
Fangchengbao Super 3 (2024)

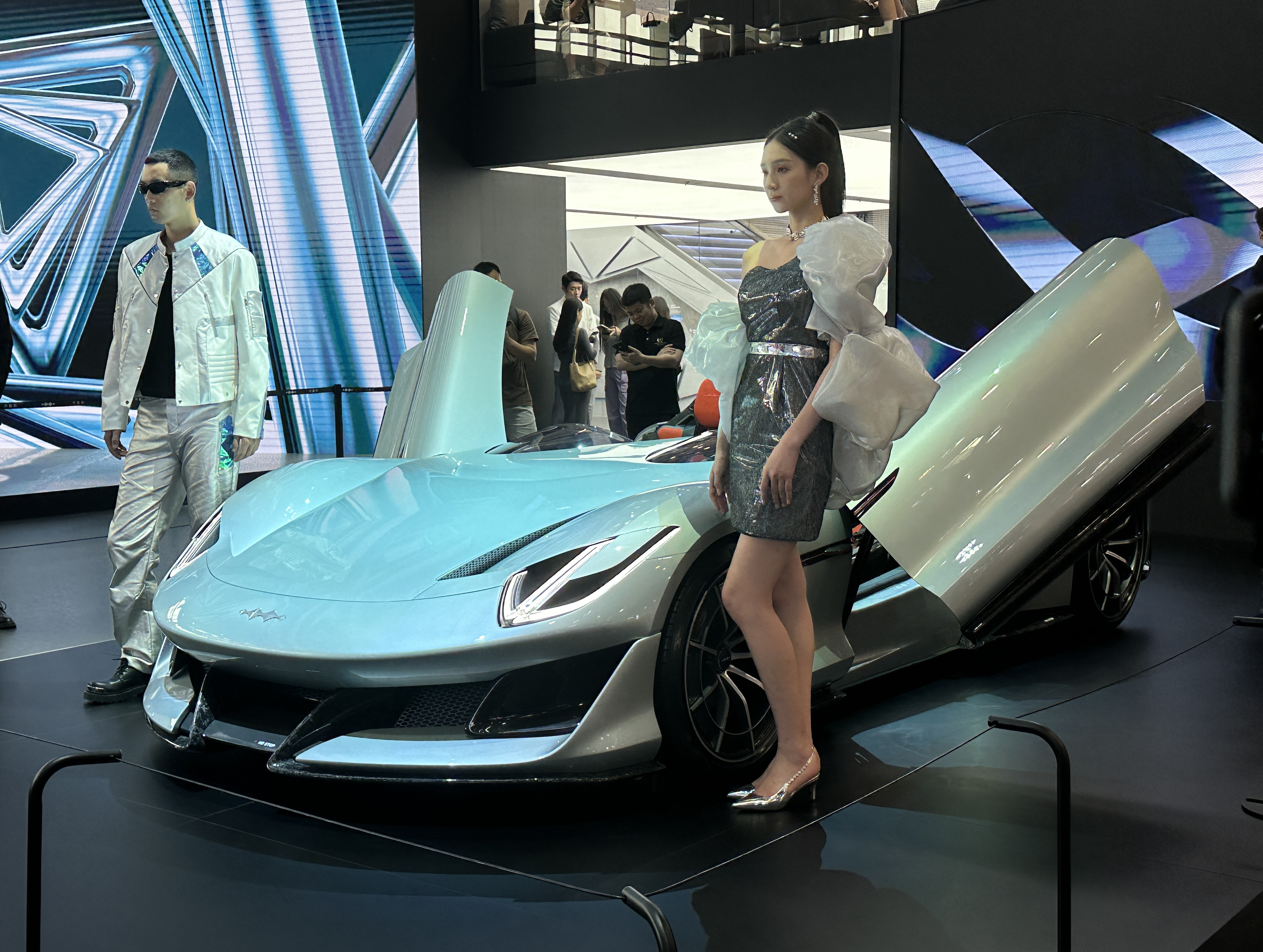
Fangchengbao Super 9 (2024)

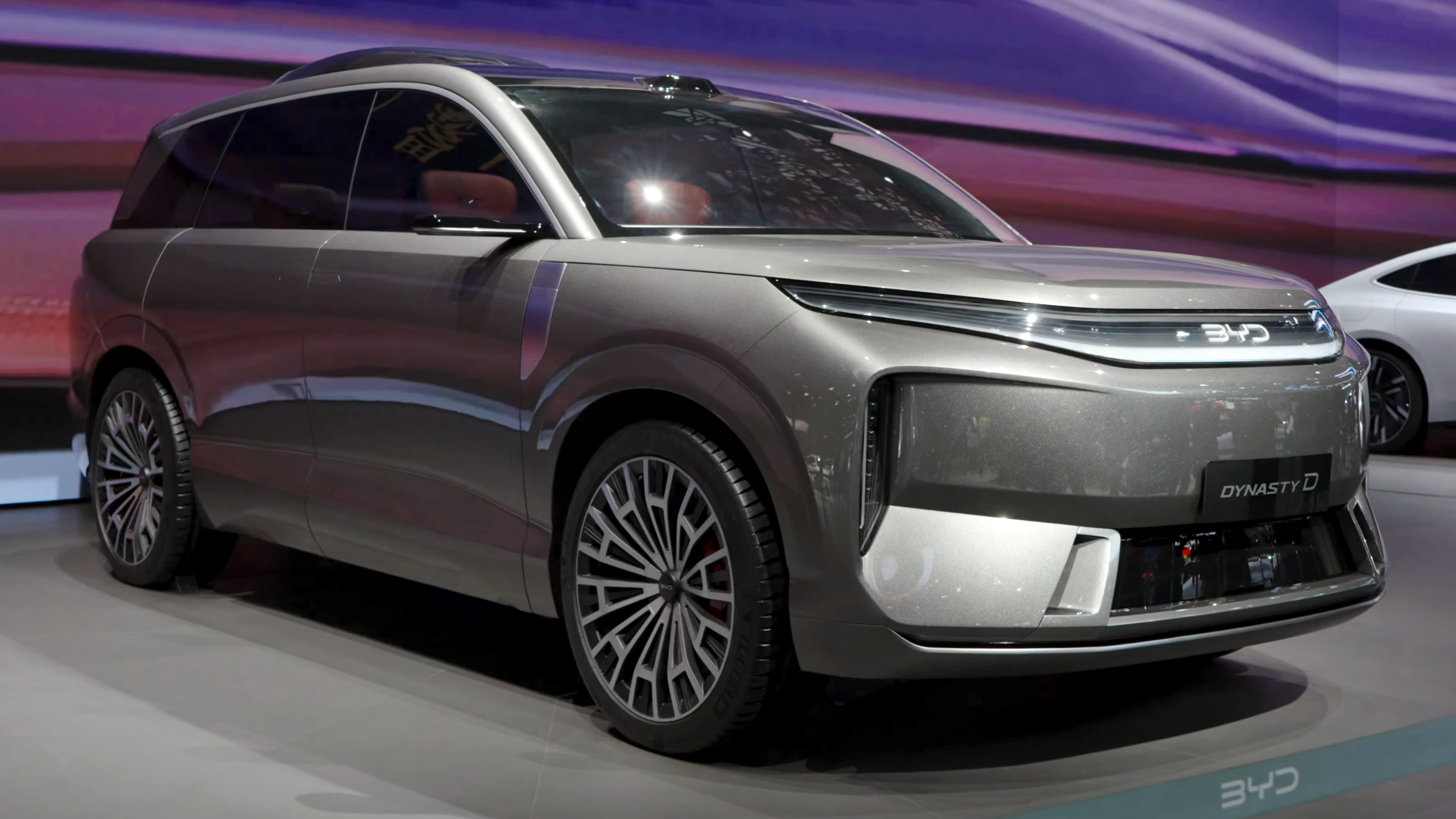
BYD Dynasty-D (2025)

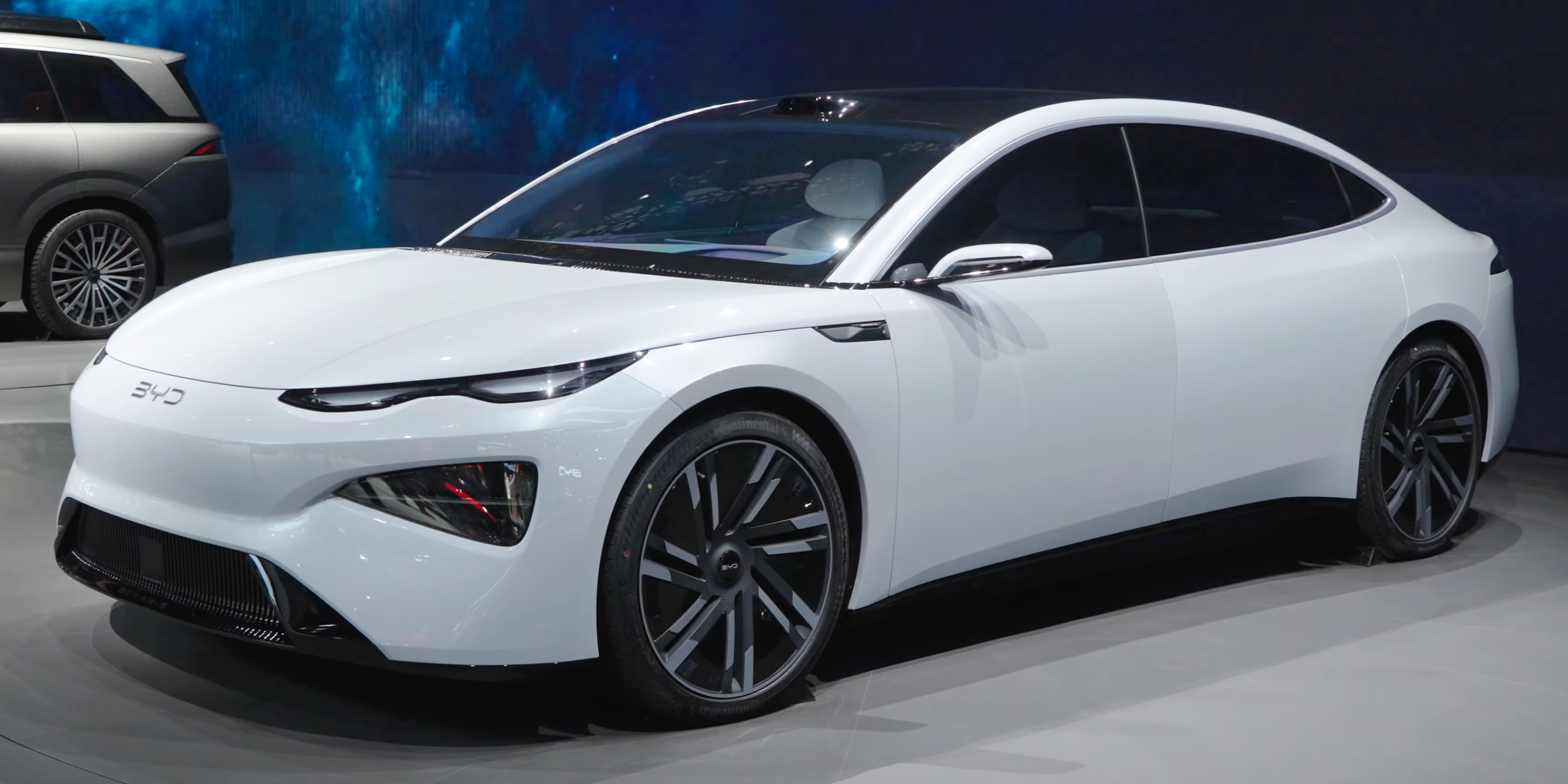
BYD Ocean-S (2025)

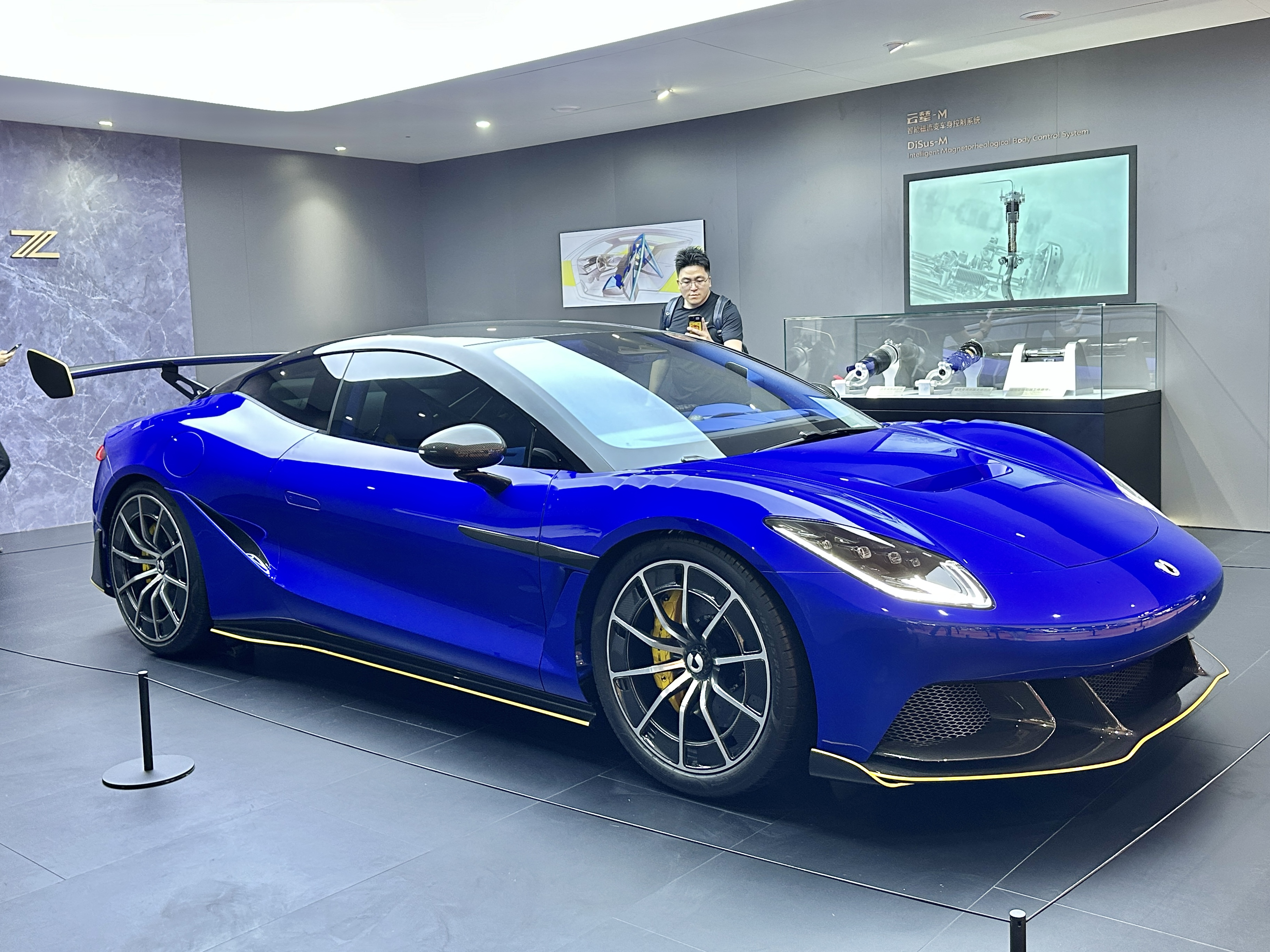
Denza Z (2025)

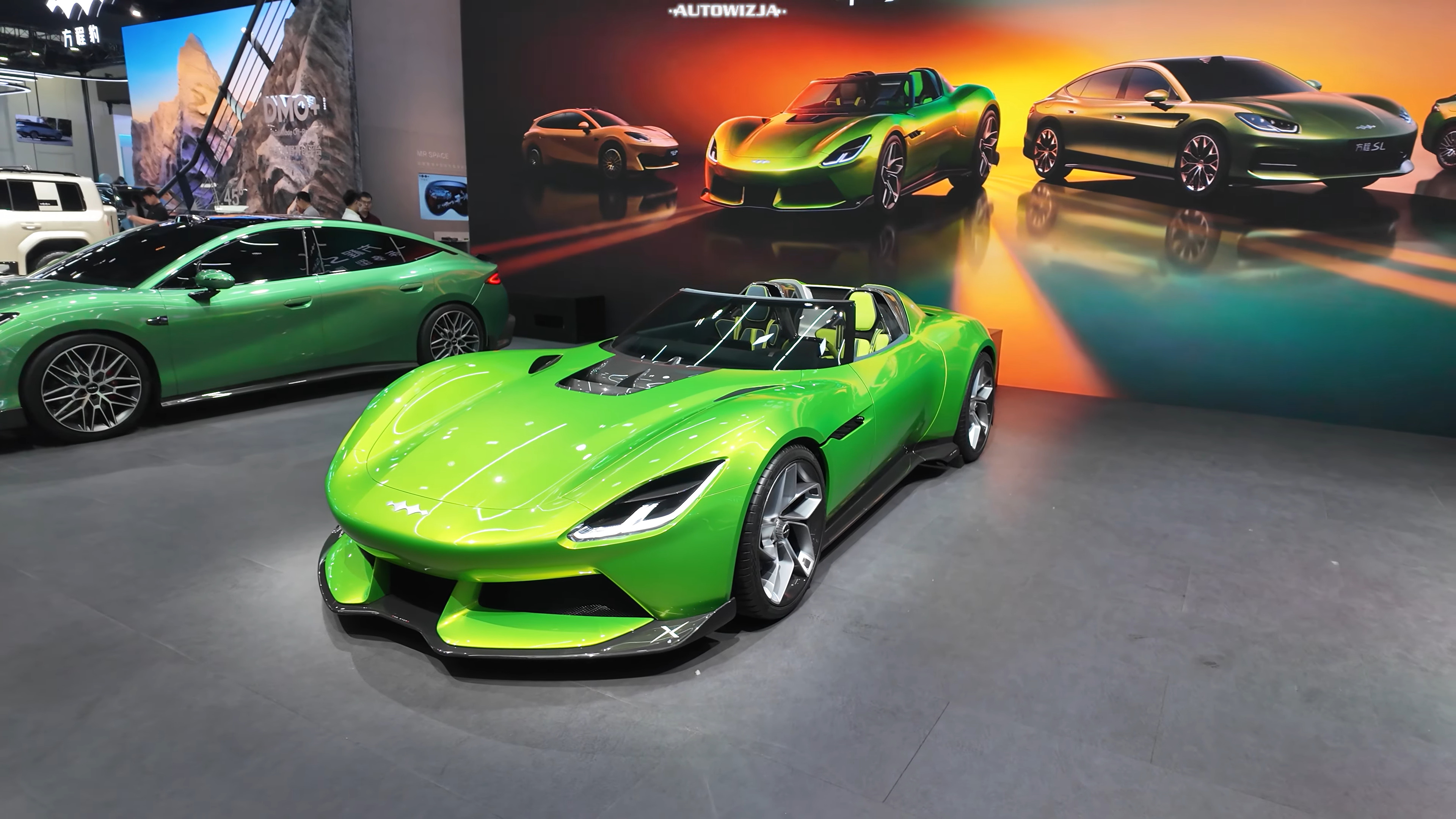
Fangchengbao Formula X (2026)

== Commercial vehicles ==
=== Transit buses ===
- BYD K6 electric bus (7 m; 23 ft)
- BYD K7 electric bus (8 m; 26 ft)
  - K7M (30.7 ft)
  - K7MER (29.9 ft)
- BYD K8 electric bus (10.5 m; 34 ft)
  - K8M (35.8 ft)
- BYD K9 (K9M and K9S) electric bus (12 m; 39 ft)
  - K9MD (40.9 ft)
- BYD K10 electric bus (double decker, 10 m; 33 ft)
- BYD K11 electric bus (articulated, 18 m; 59 ft)
  - K11M (60.7 ft)
- BYD B series, successor for the K series.
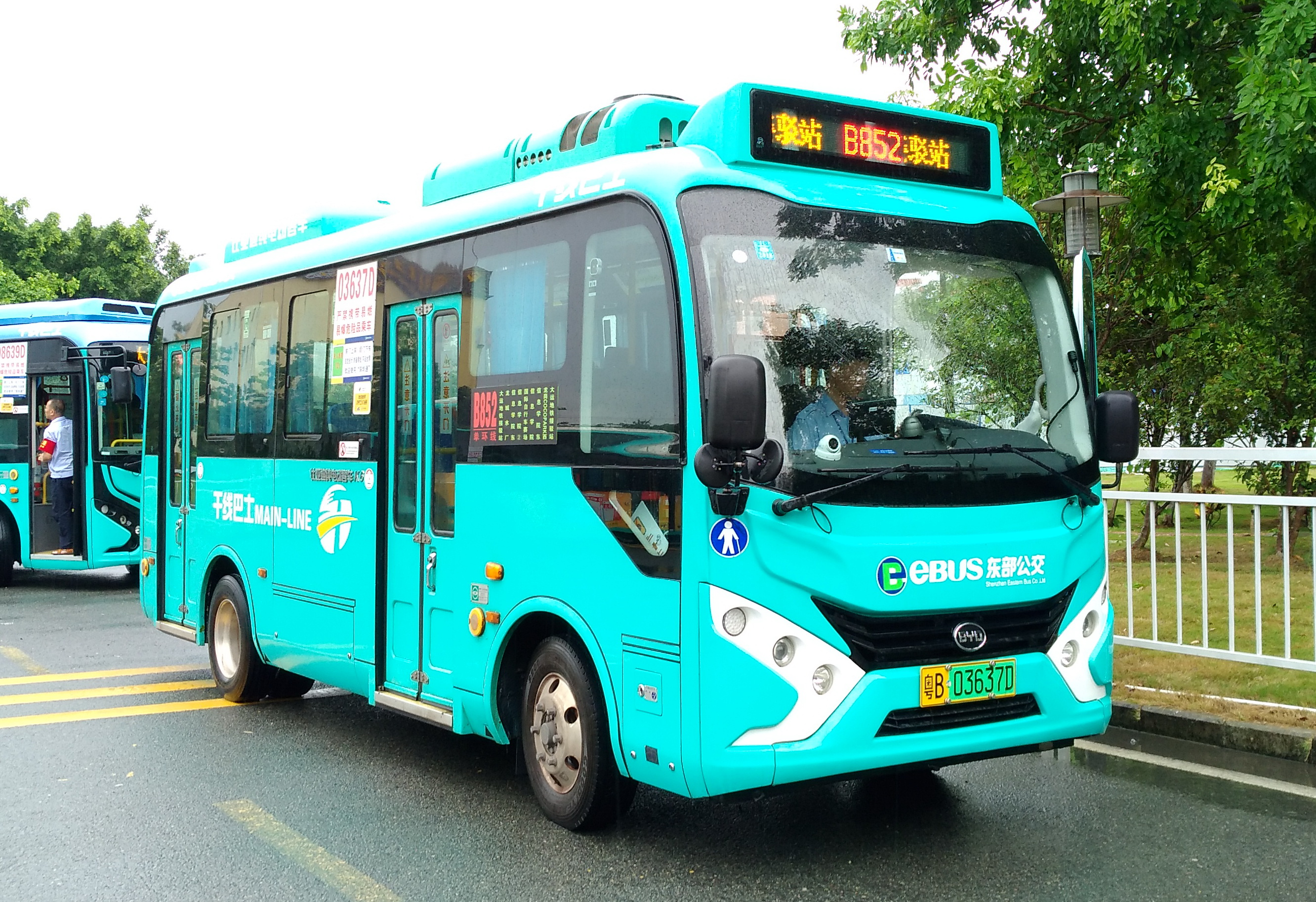
BYD K6

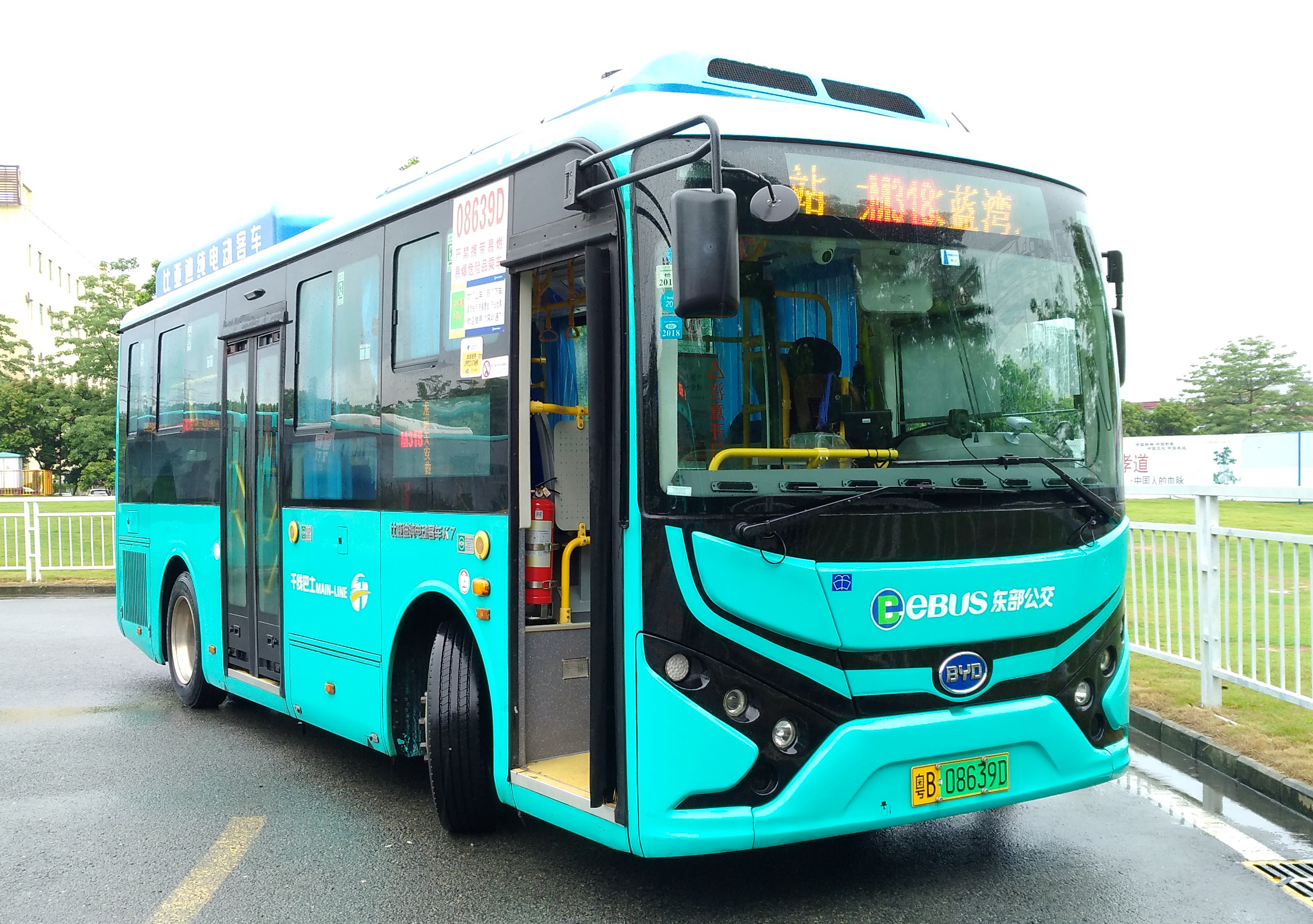
BYD K7

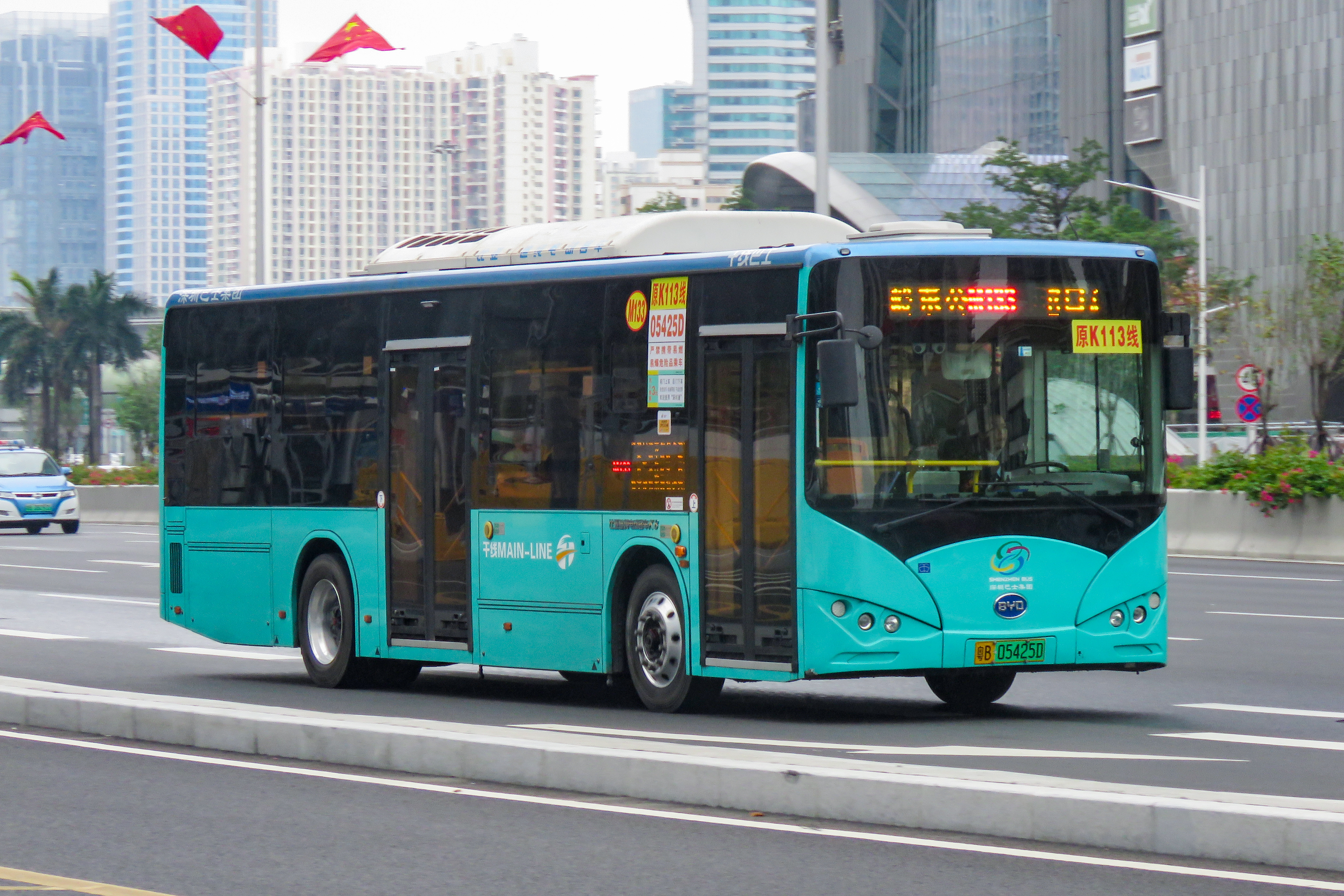
BYD K8

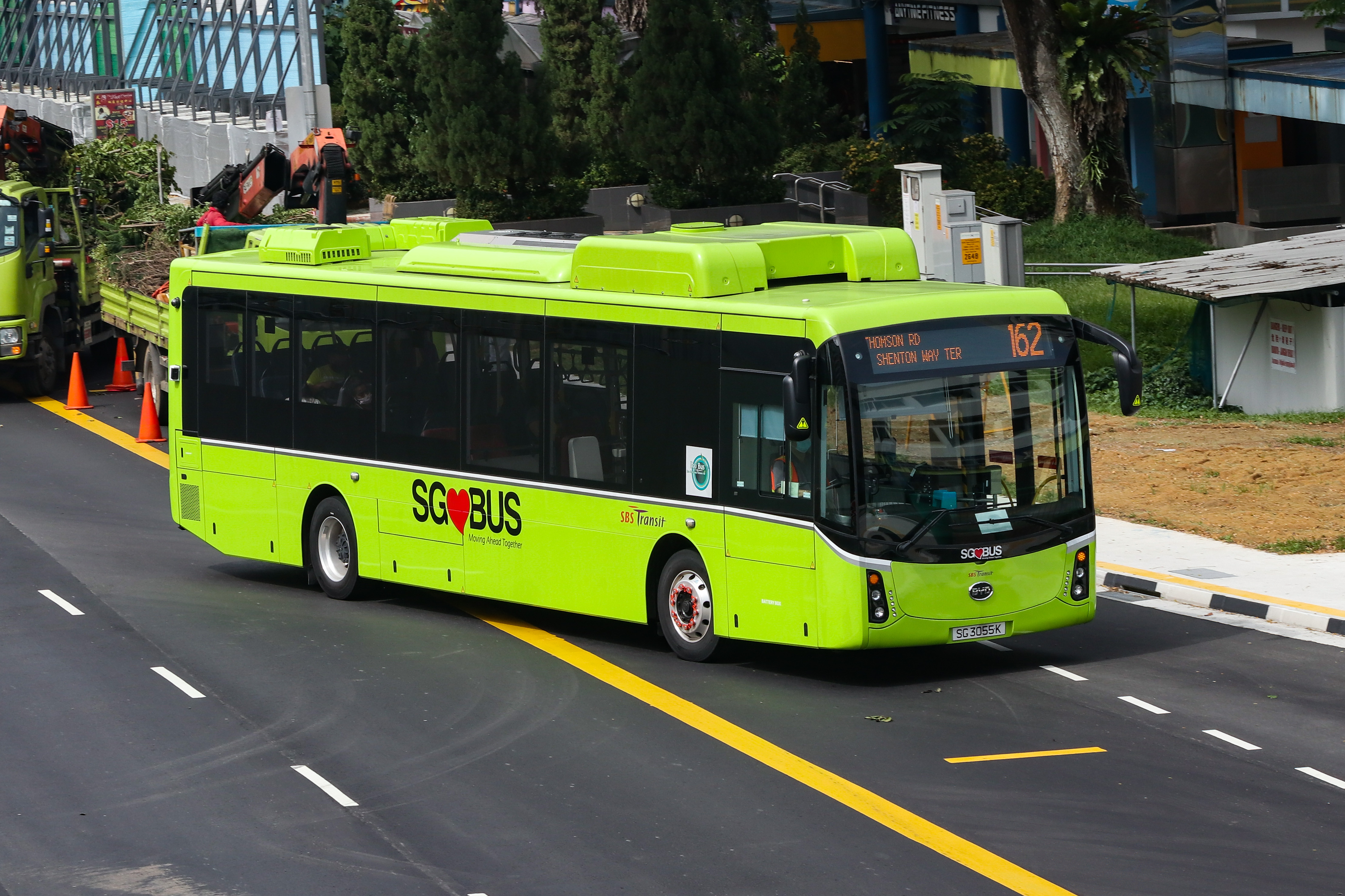
BYD K9

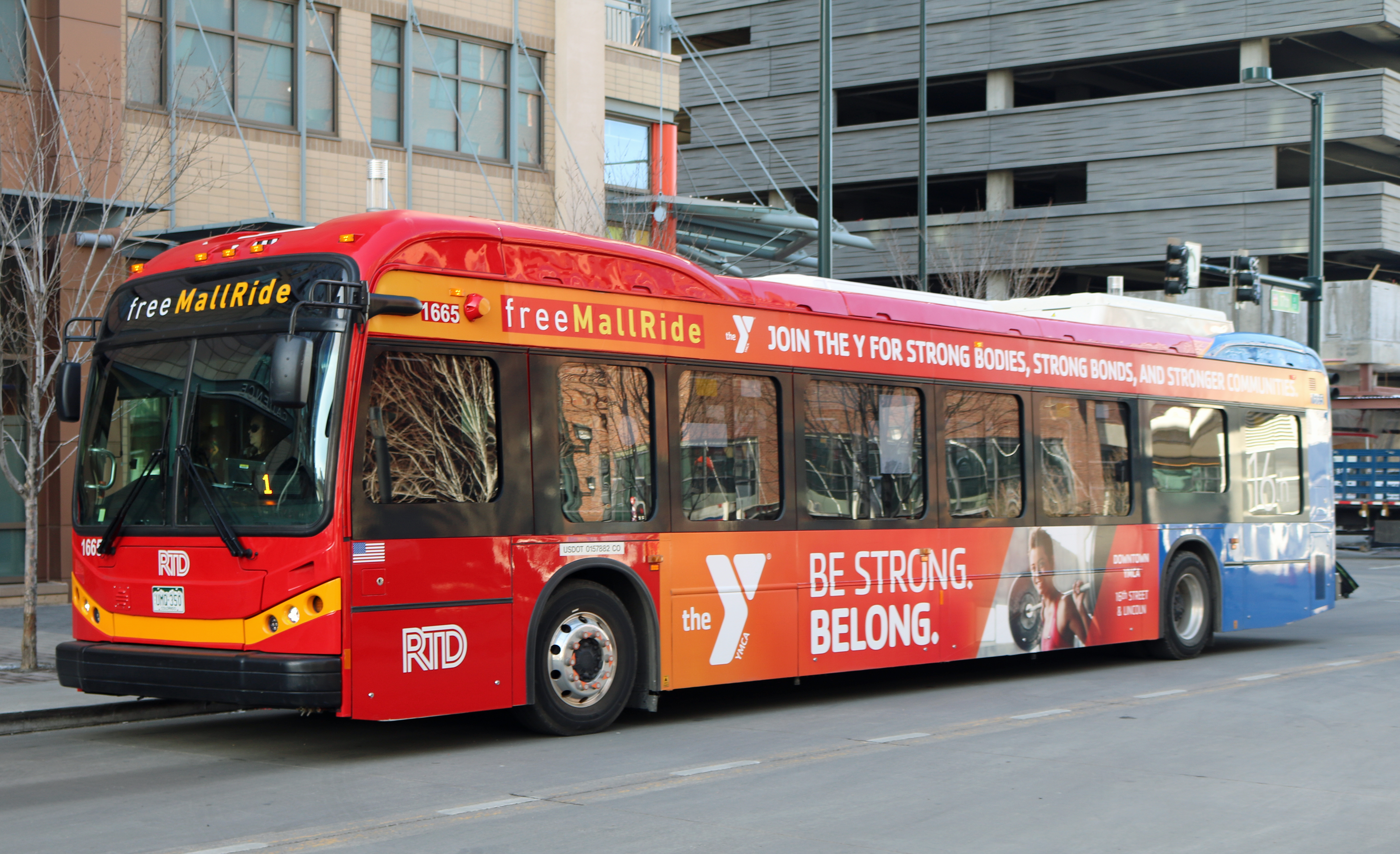
BYD K10

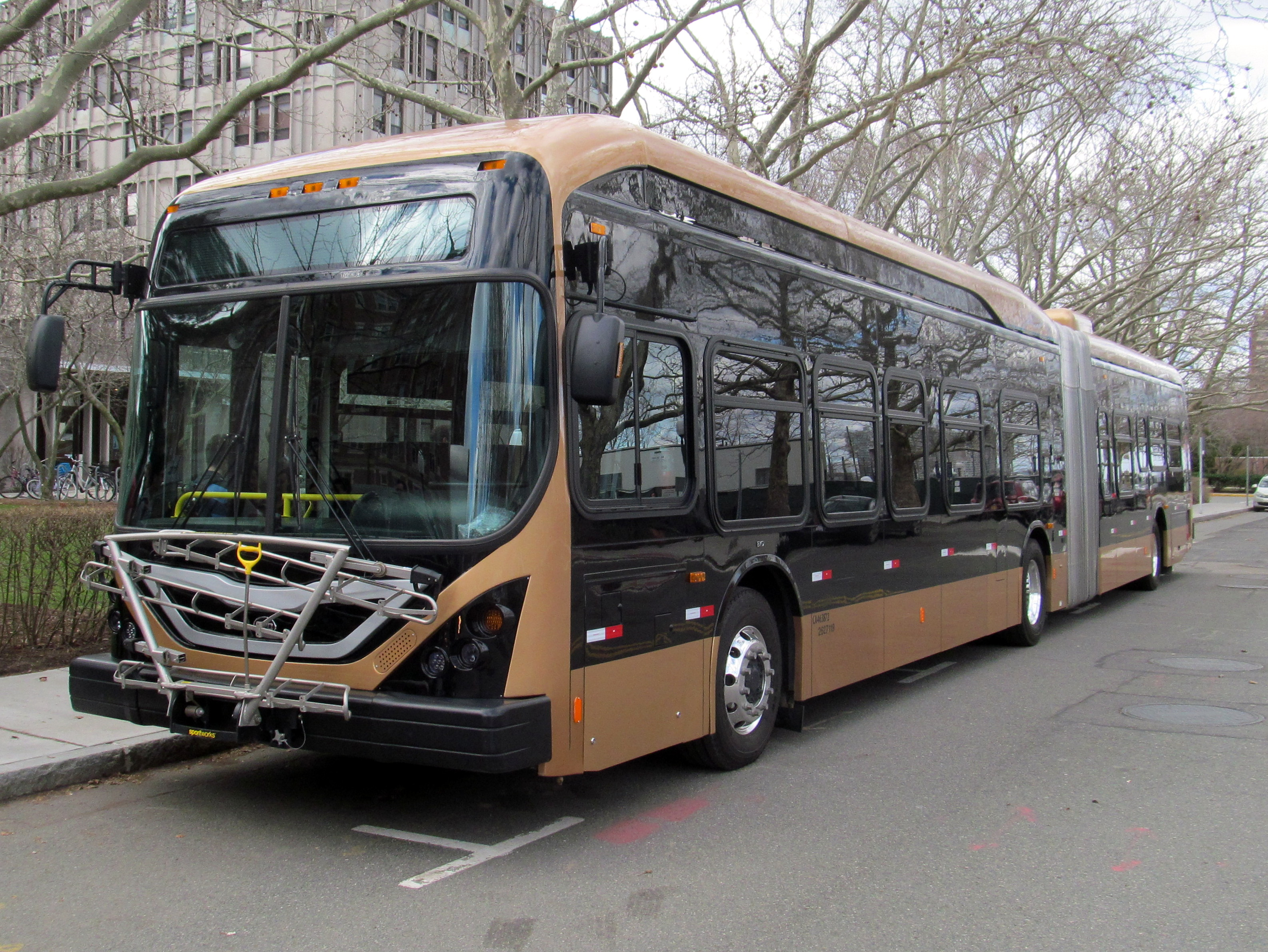
BYD K11

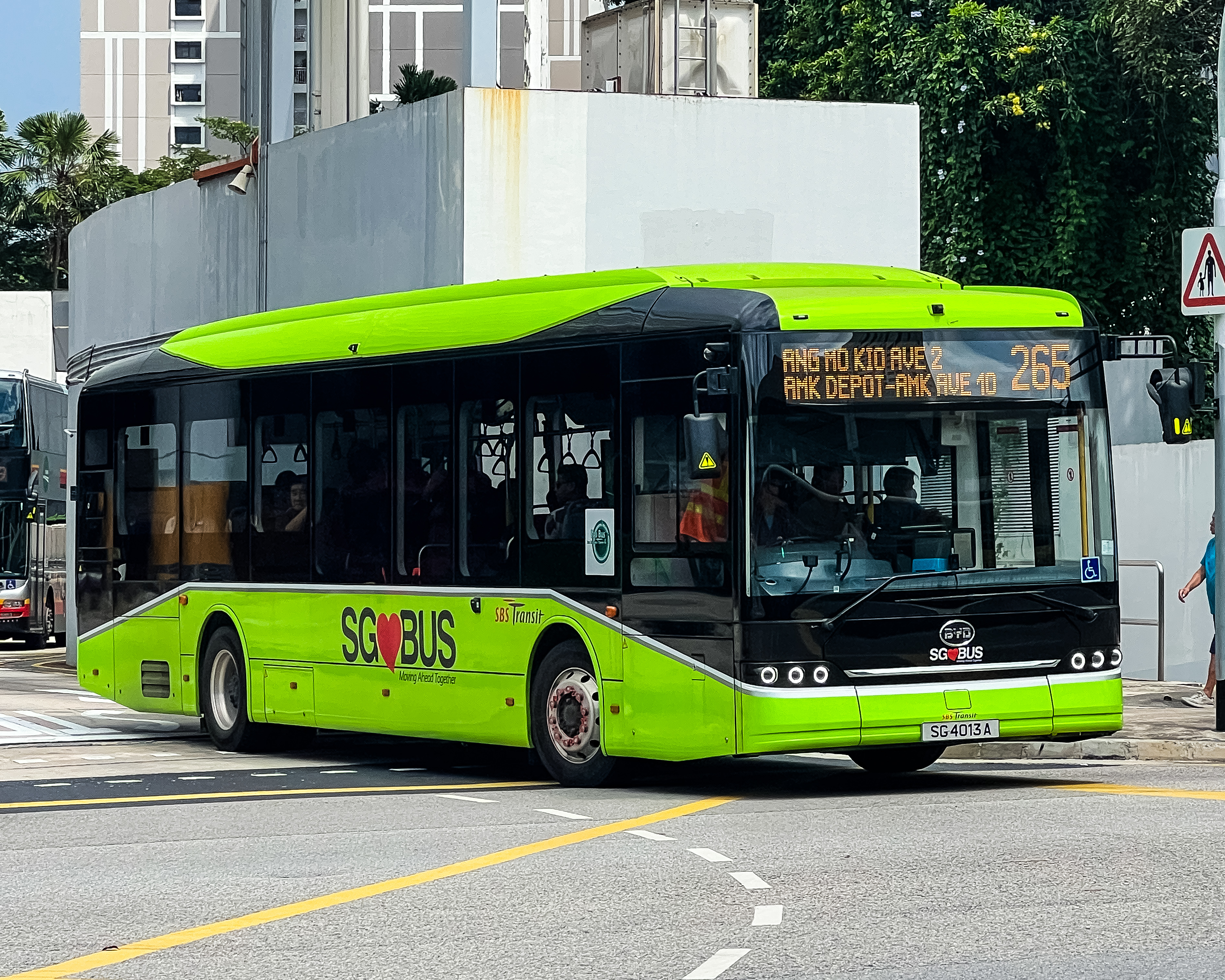
BYD B-series

=== School buses ===
- BYD Achiever - Type A School Bus (US only)
- BYD Creator - Type C School Bus
- BYD Dreamer - Type D School Bus (US only)

=== Coaches ===
- BYD C6 electric coach (7 m; 23 ft)
- BYD C7 electric coach (7.9 m; 26 ft)
- BYD C8 electric coach (10.5 m; 34 ft)
- BYD C9 electric coach (12 m; 39 ft)
- BYD C10 electric coach (14 m; 46 ft)
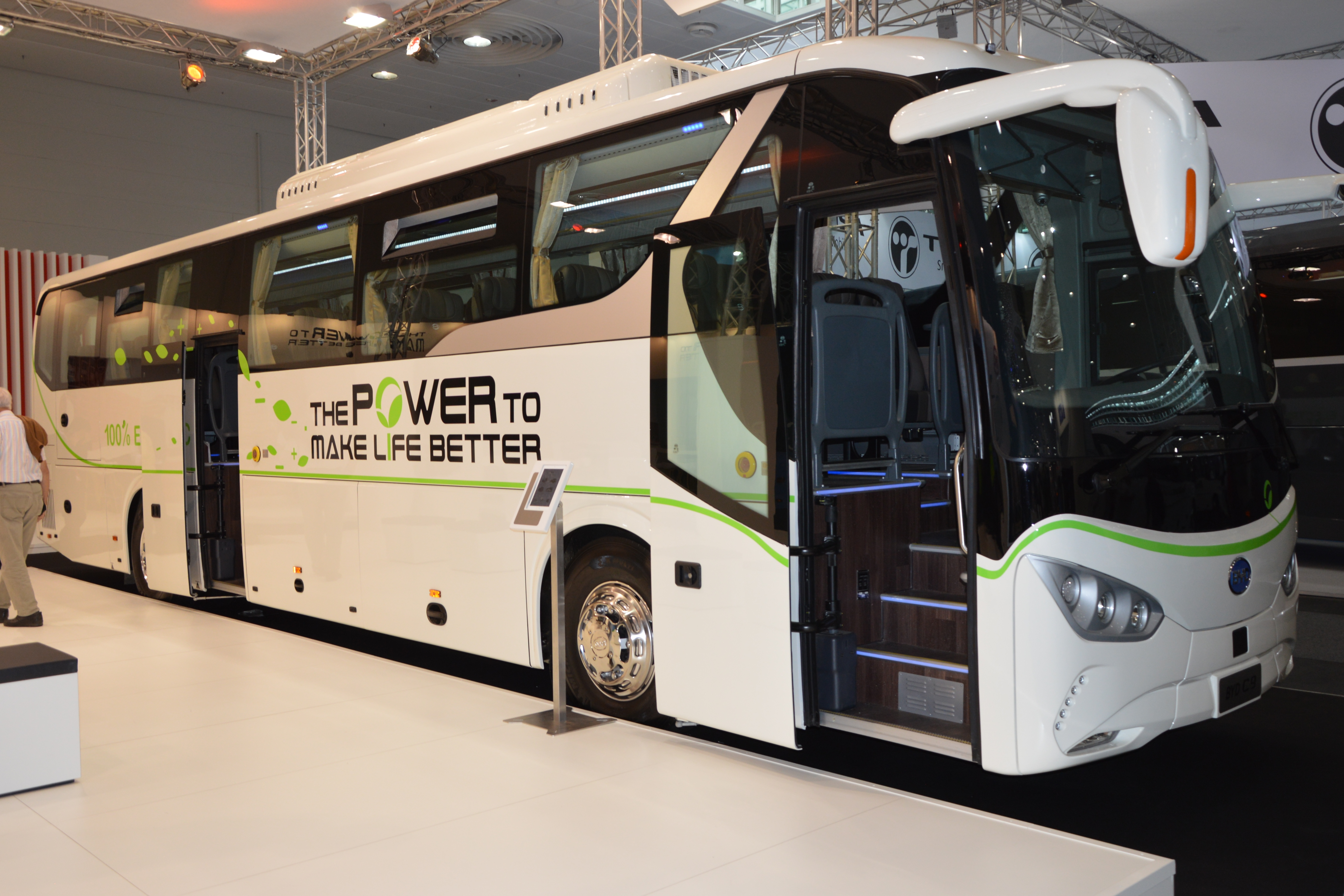
BYD C9

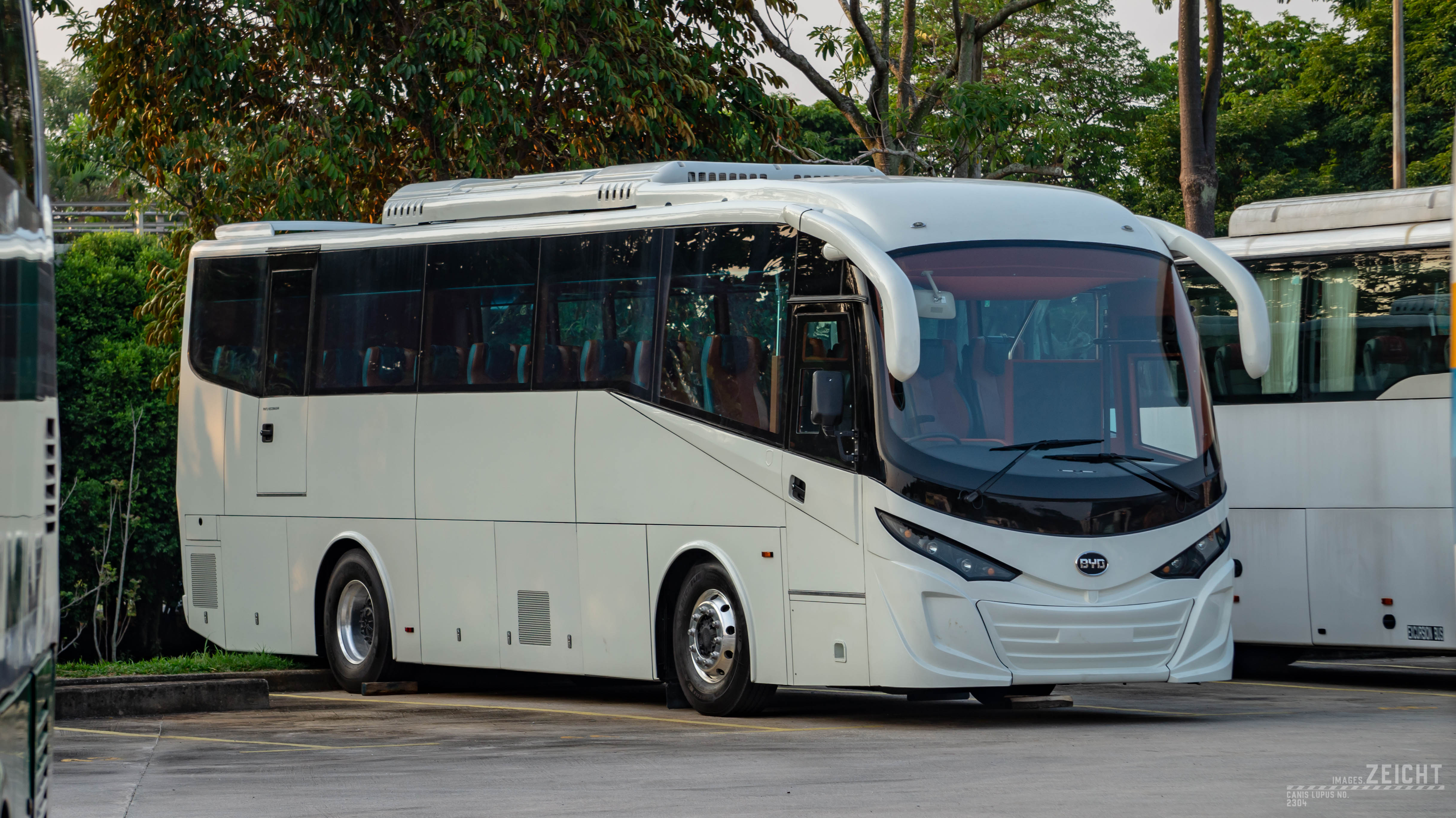
BYD C8

=== Vans ===
- BYD T3 / ETP3 (commercial electric van)
- BYD V3 (microvan)
- BYD Class 6 (electric step van)
- BYD E-Vali (3.5-ton electric commercial van)
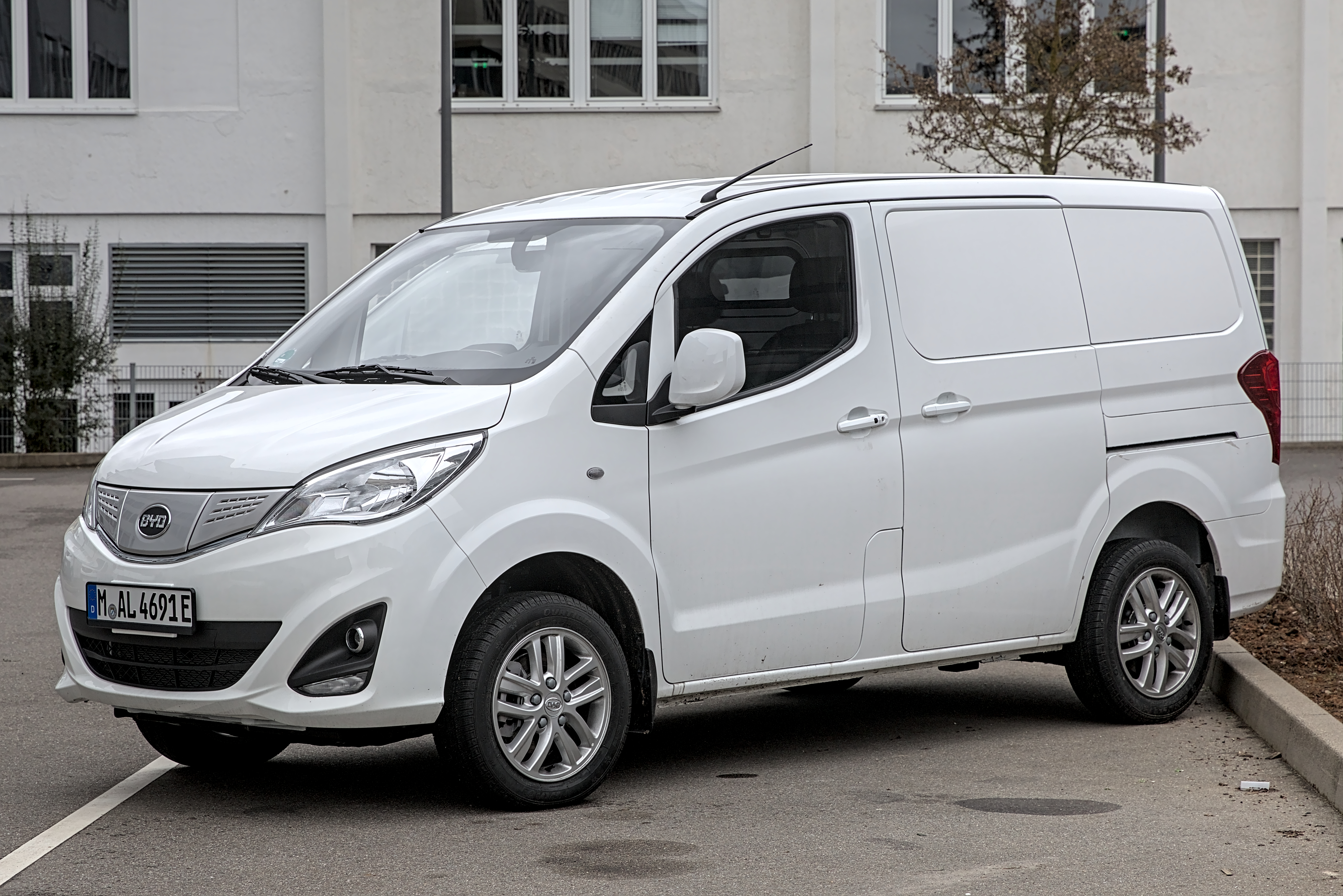
BYD ETP3

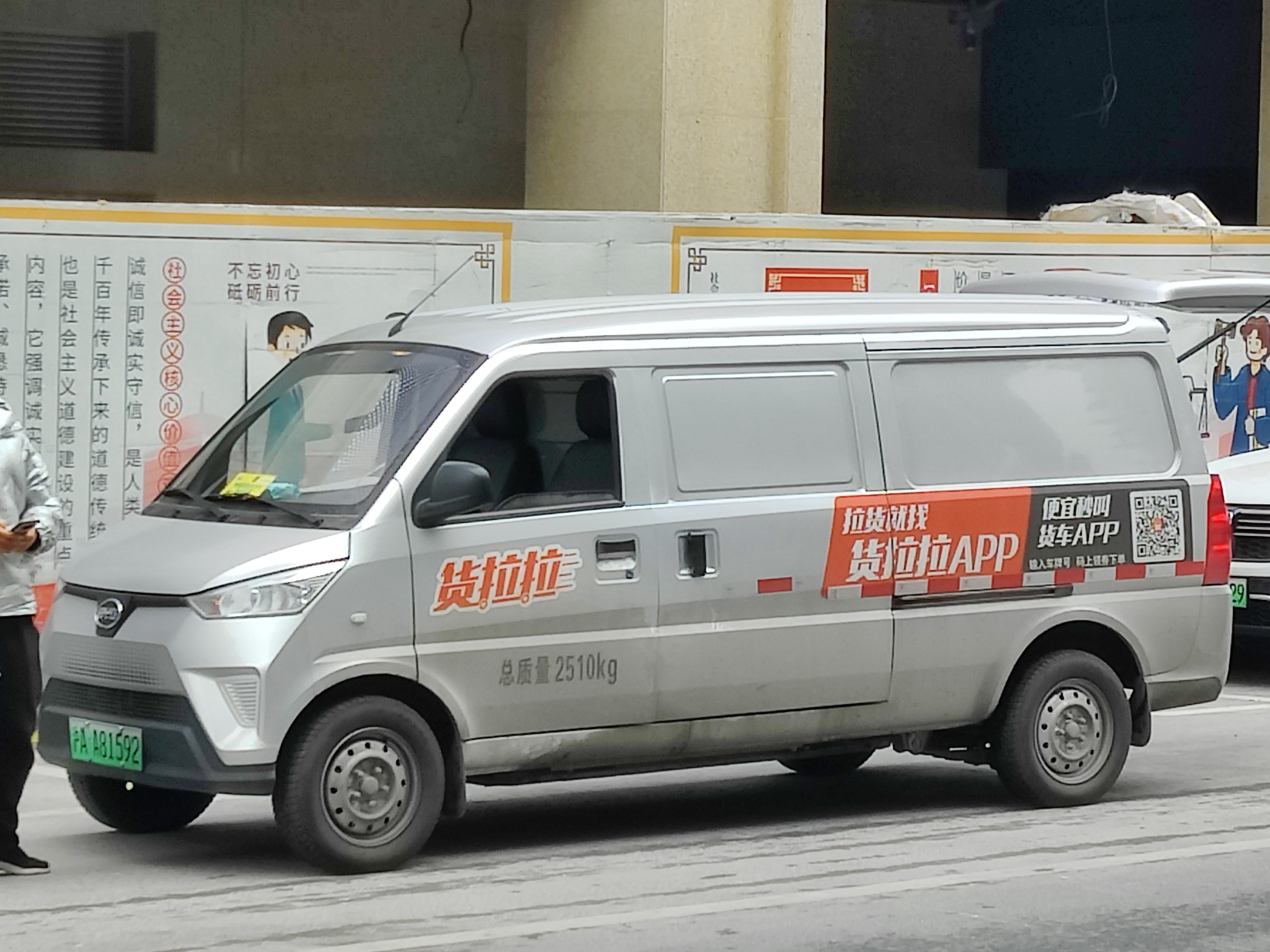
BYD V3

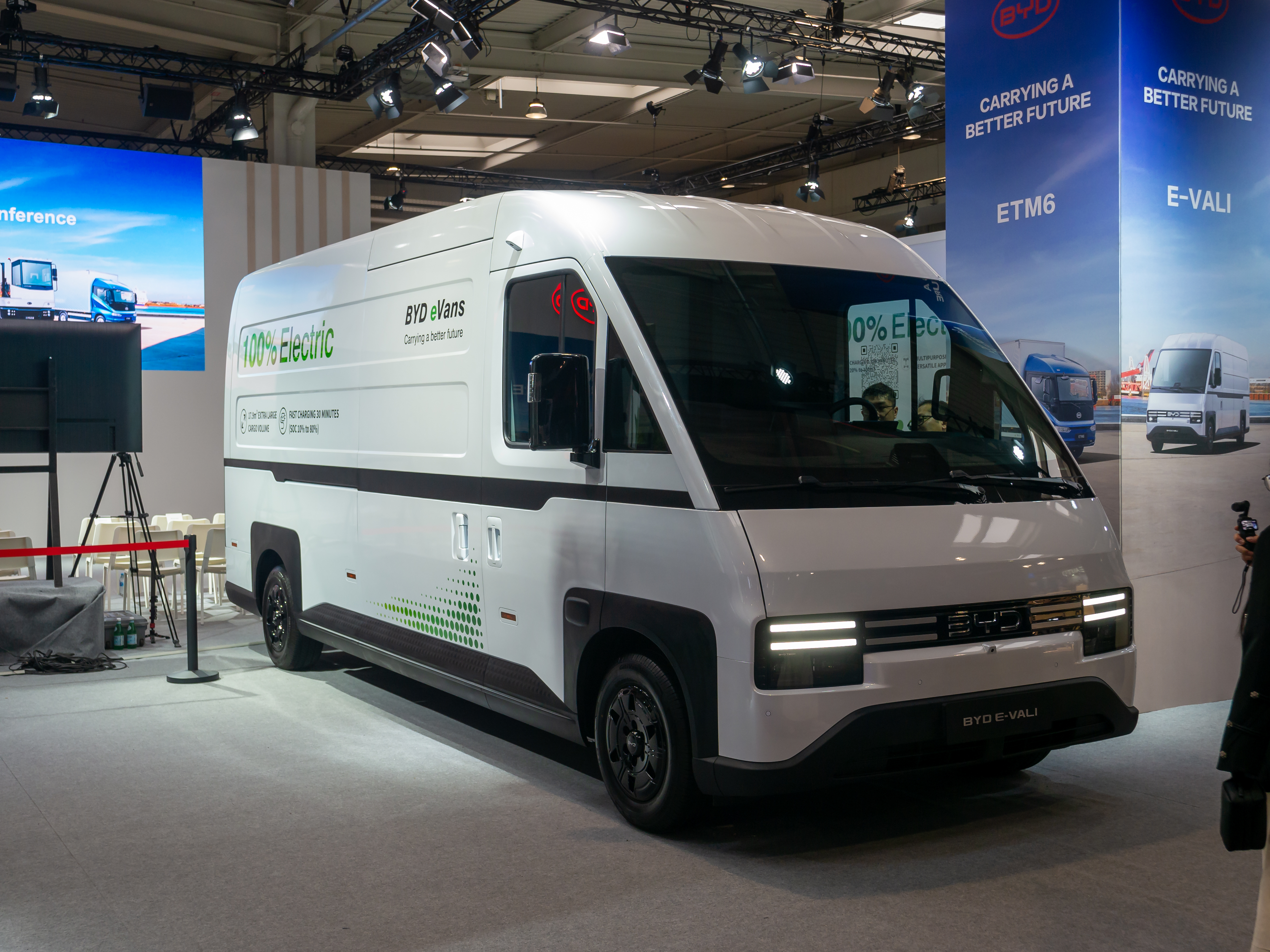
BYD E-Vali

=== Trucks ===
- BYD T4 (T35)
- BYD ETM6 (Class 5 electric truck)
- BYD T4K (South Korean market only)
- BYD T5 (Class 5 electric truck)
- BYD T7 (Class 6 electric truck)
- BYD T8 (Class 8 electric truck)
- BYD T9 (Class 8 electric truck)
- BYD T31 (Class 8 electric truck)
- BYD T50 (Electric truck)
- BYD ETM6 (Class 6 electric truck)
- BYD ETH8 (Class 8 electric truck)
- BYD T10 (Class 8 electric truck)
- BYD 8TT (Class 8 electric semi-truck)
- BYD Q1M / BYD 8Y (Class 8 Terminal tractor)
- BYD 8R (refuse truck)
- BYD 6F (electric chassis cab)
- BYD 6R (electric refuse truck)
- BYD ETT 44 (electric tractor unit, European market only)
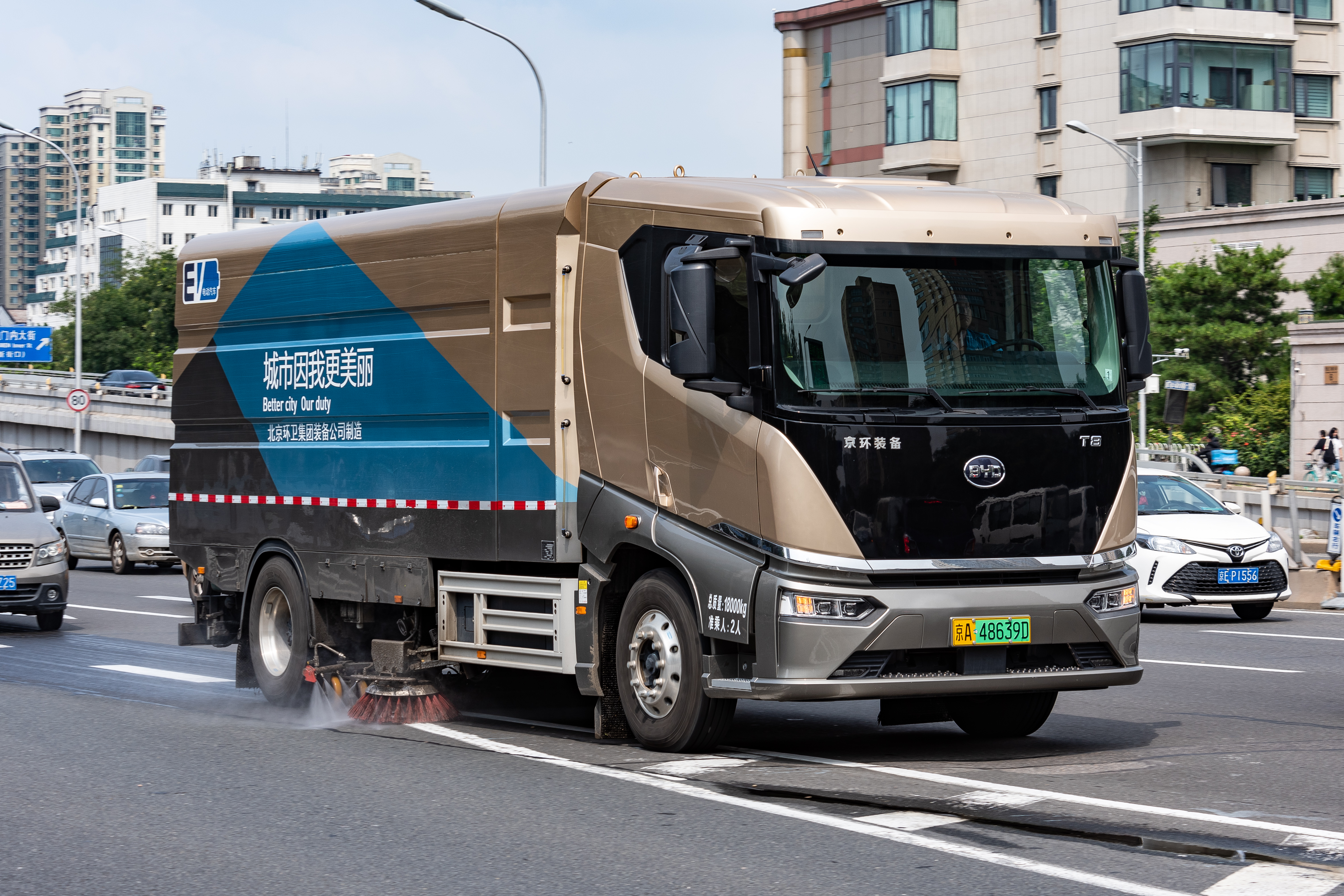
BYD T8 street sweeper truck

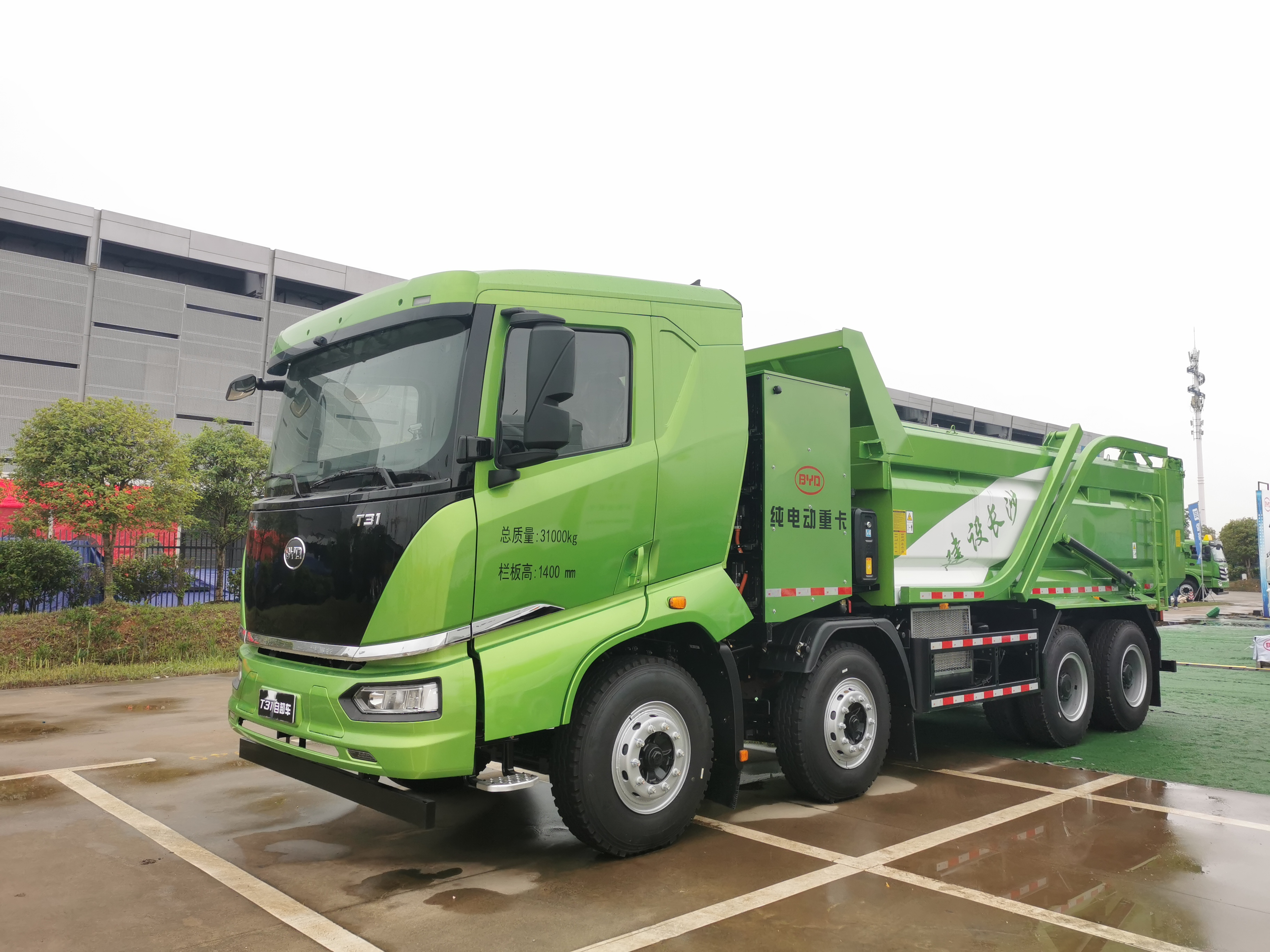
BYD T31

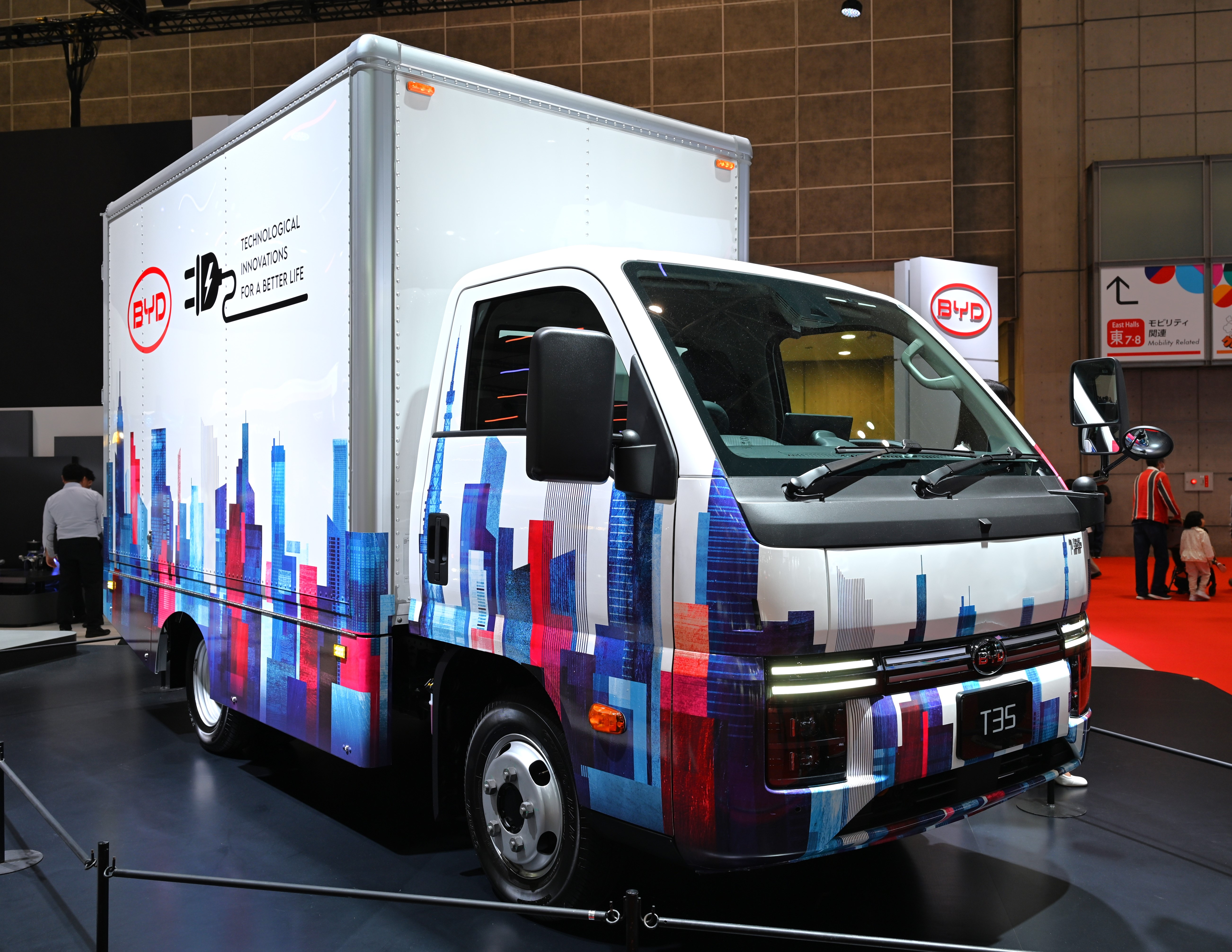
BYD T35

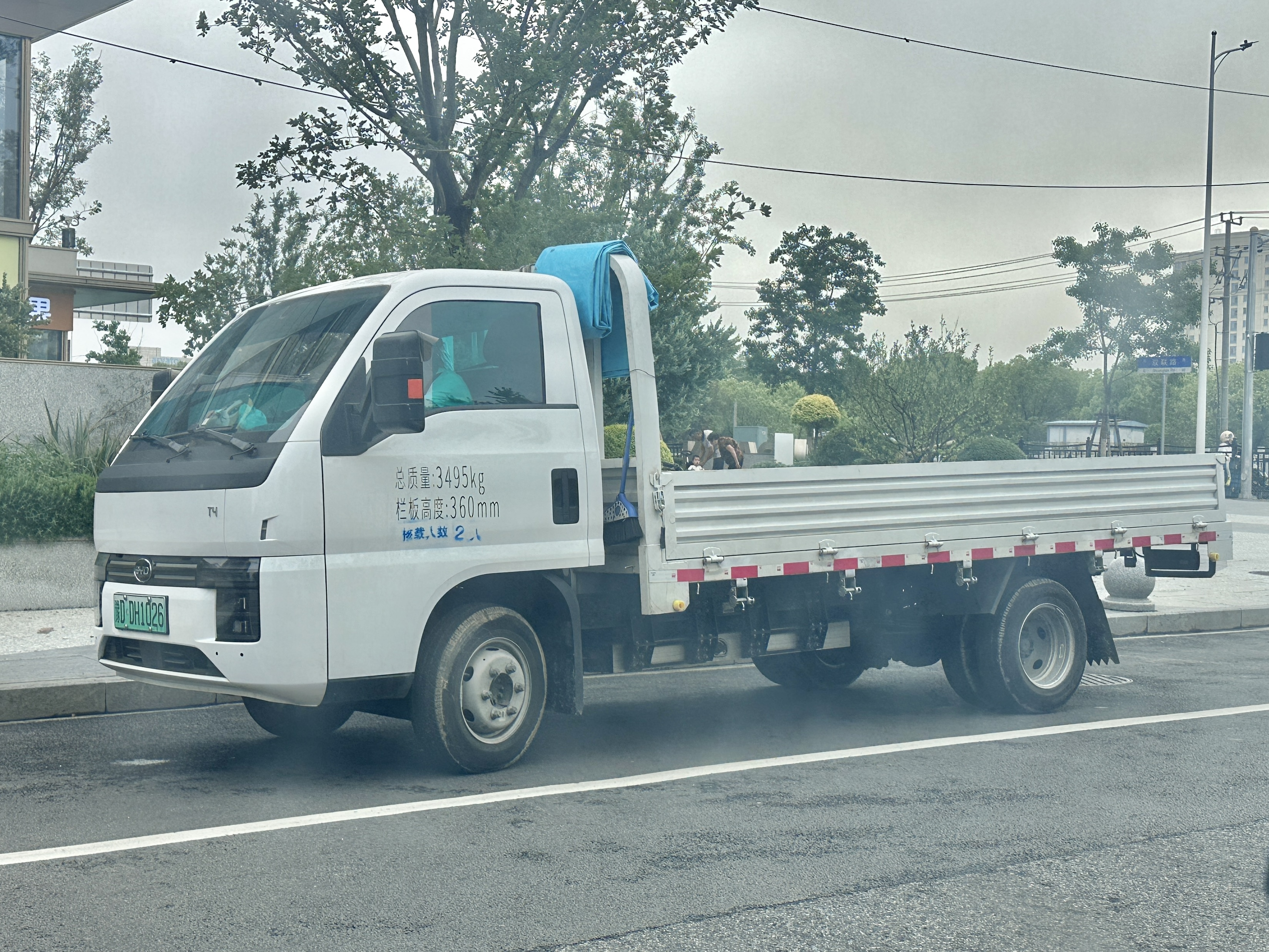
BYD T4

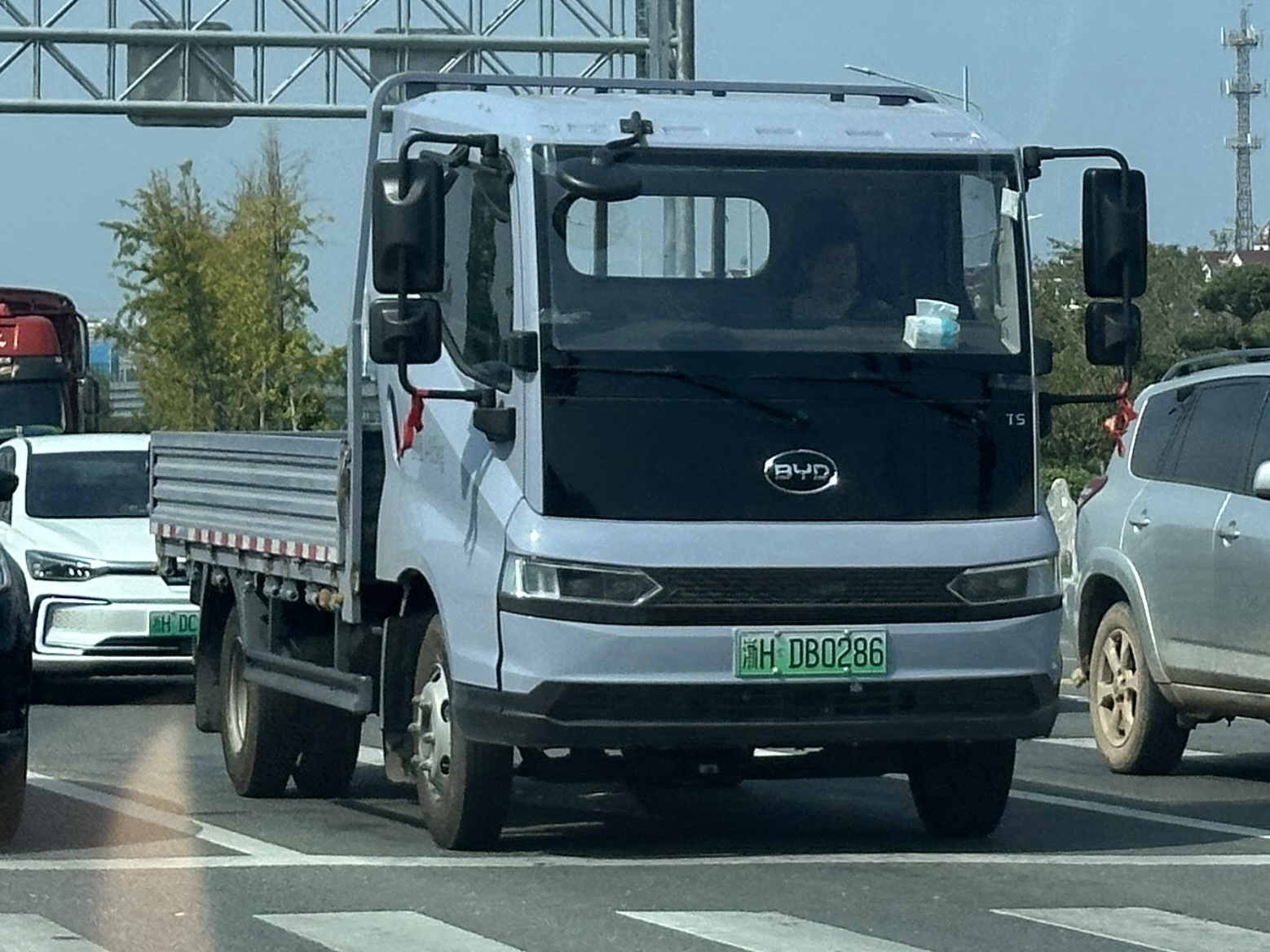
BYD T5

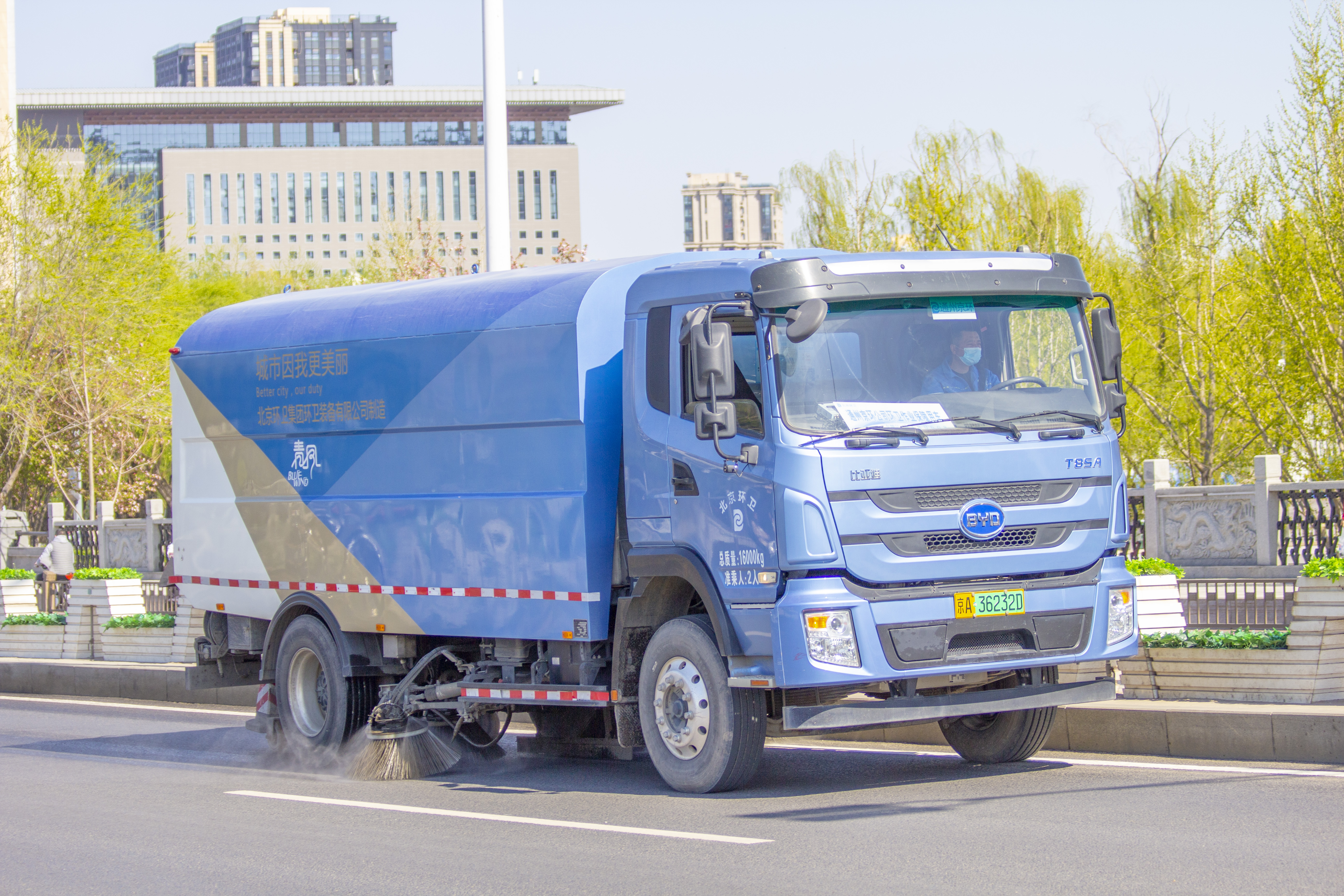
BYD T8

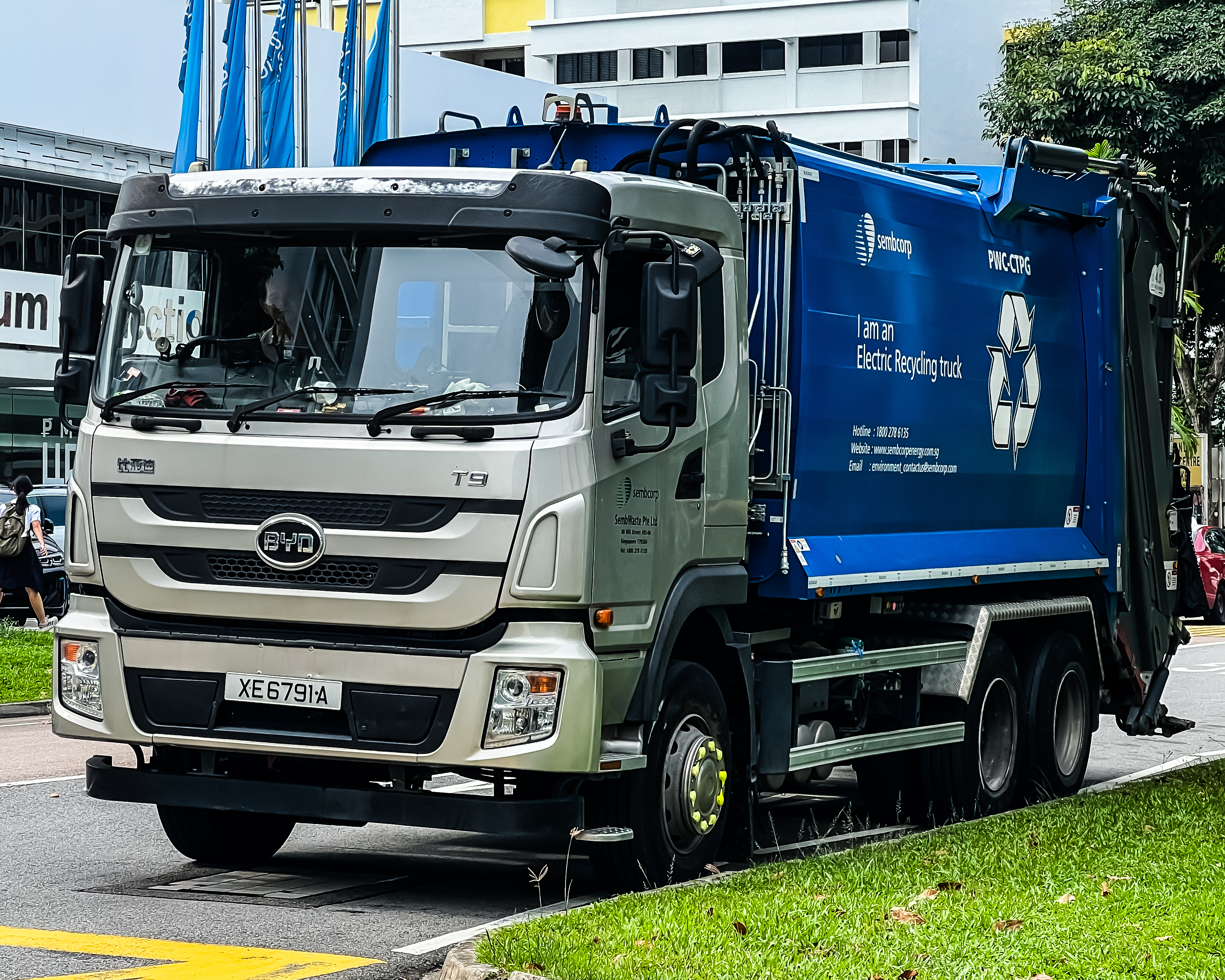
BYD T9

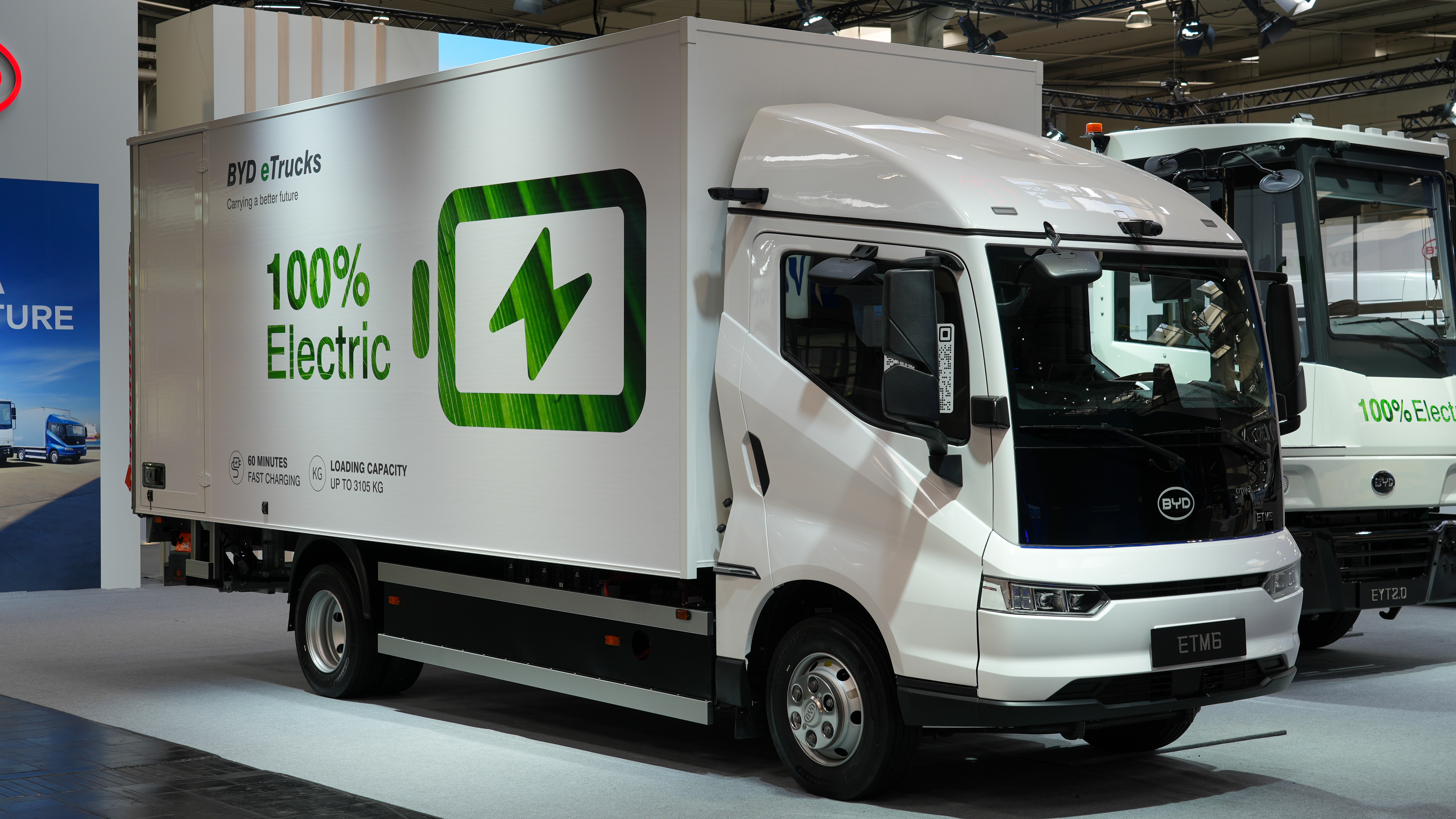
BYD ETM6

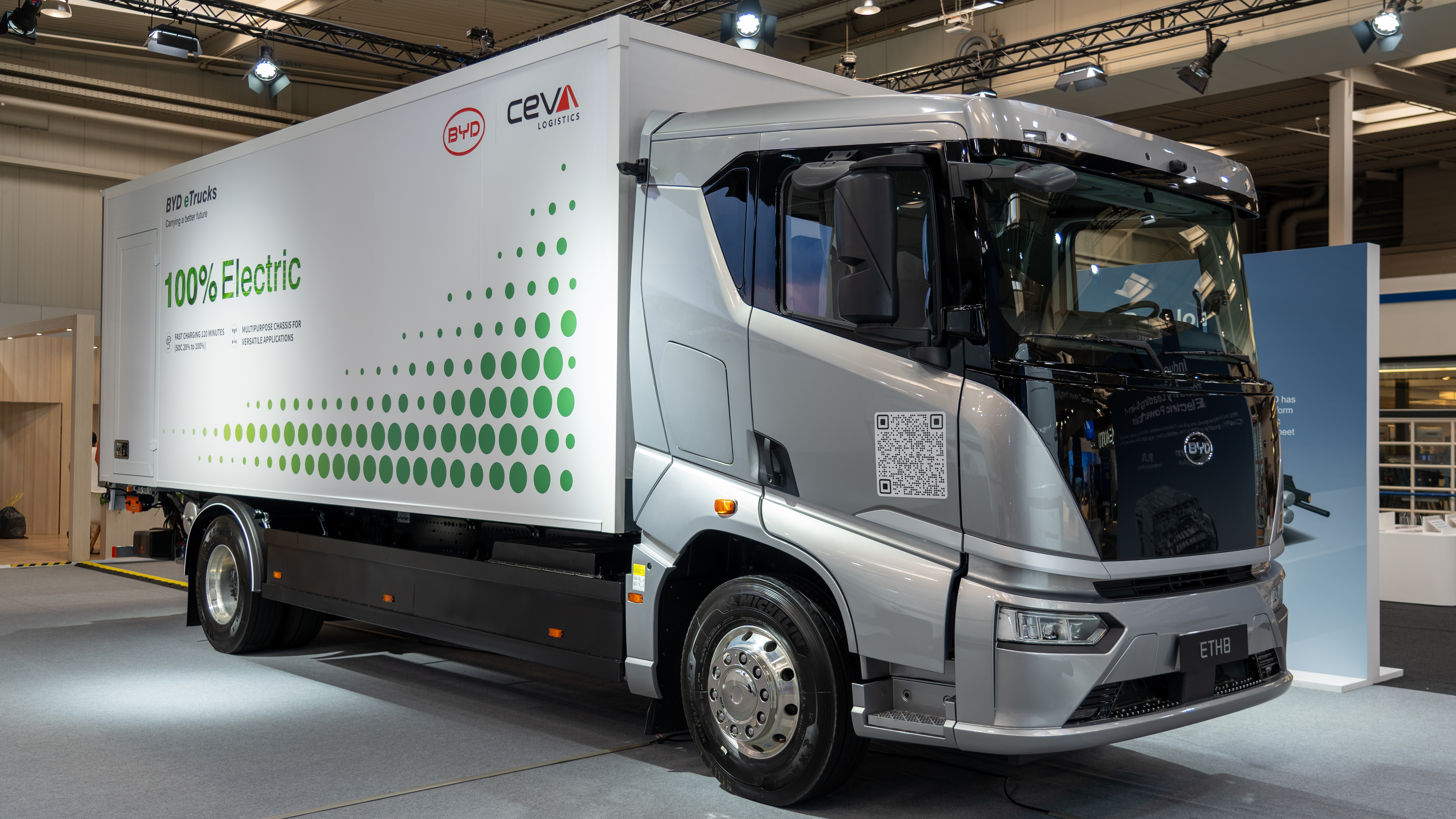
BYD ETH8

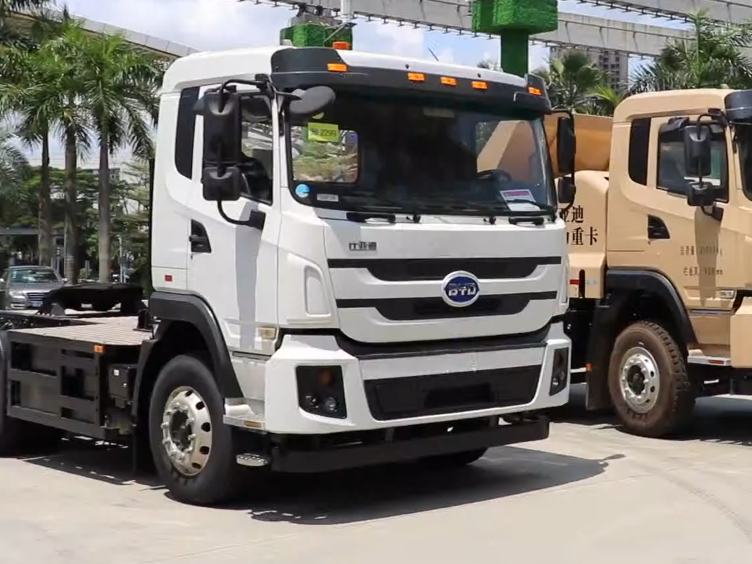
BYD 8TT

=== Utilities ===
- BYD J9G (electric garbage truck)

=== Construction ===
- BYD J9C (electric concrete mixer truck)

=== Logistics ===
- BYD J9D (electric container port drayage truck)
- BYD EYT 2.0 (electric container port drayage truck)
- BYD T50 (electric tow tractor)
- BYD T20 (electric autonomous tow tractor)
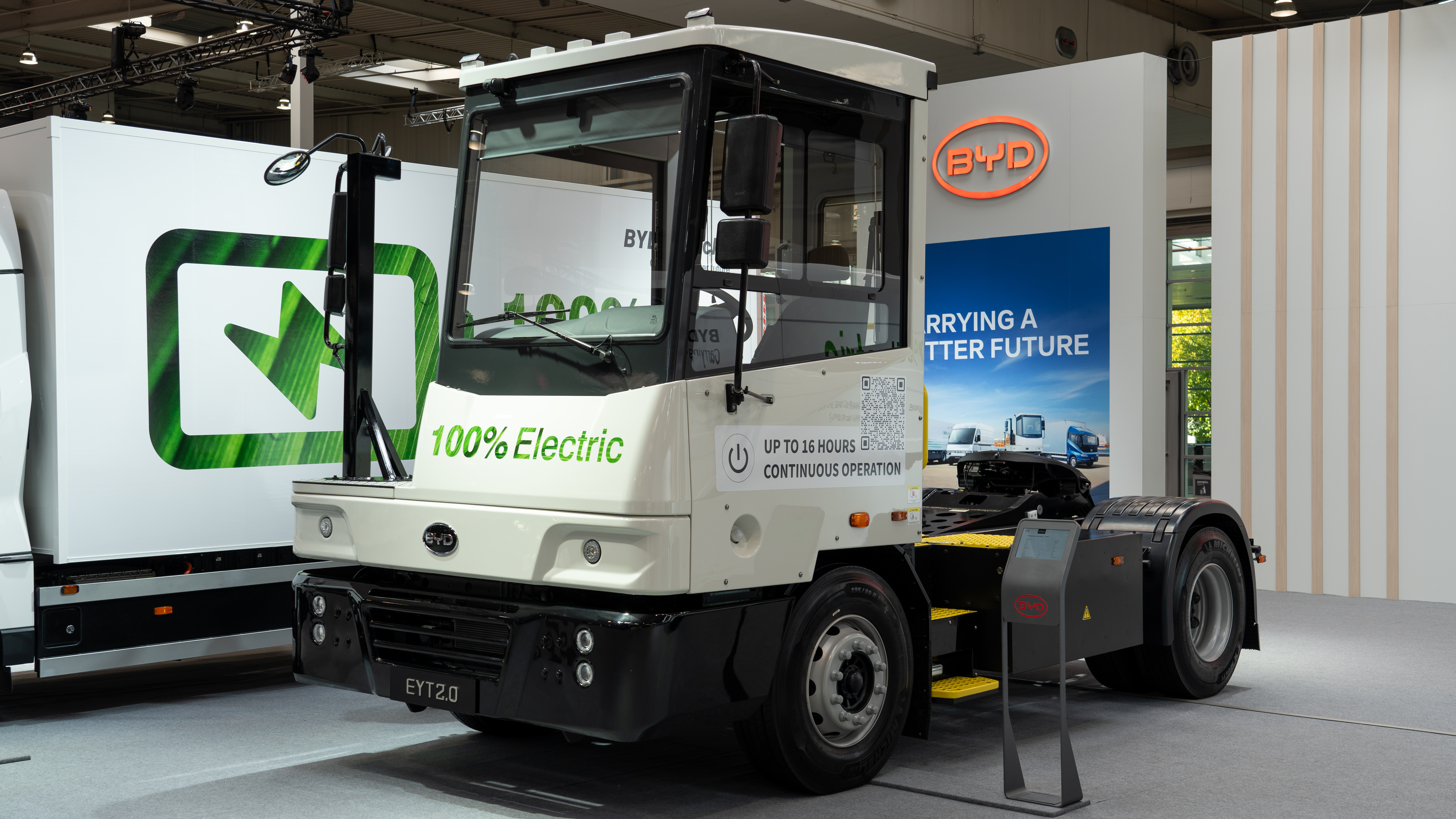
BYD EYT 2.0

=== Mining ===
- BYD V60 (electric haul truck)
