= List of vehicles named BYD Seal =

The BYD Seal (Chinese: 比亚迪海豹; pinyin: Bǐyàdí Hǎibào) is an automotive nameplate used by BYD Auto for several models:

- BYD Seal, a mid-size battery electric sedan produced since 2022
- BYD Seal 05 DM-i or Seal 5 DM-i, a compact plug-in hybrid sedan produced since 2025, successor to the BYD Destroyer 05
  - BYD Seal 5 DM-i, a similar compact plug-in hybrid sedan for the Southeast Asia market, renamed BYD Destroyer 05
- BYD Seal 06 EV, a smaller mid-size battery electric sedan produced since 2025
  - BYD Seal 6 EV, a similar mid-size battery electric hybrid sedan for the Malaysia and Singapore market, renamed BYD Qin L EV
- BYD Seal 06 DM-i or Seal 6 DM-i, a smaller mid-size plug-in hybrid sedan and station wagon produced since 2024
  - BYD Seal 6 DM-i, a similar mid-size plug-in hybrid sedan for the Uzbekistan market, renamed BYD Qin L DM-i
- BYD Seal 06 GT, a battery electric hatchback produced since 2024
- BYD Seal 07, a plug-in hybrid and battery electric mid-size sedan produced since 2023
- BYD Seal 08, a plug-in hybrid and battery electric full-size sedan produced since 2026
- BYD Seal U, a plug-in hybrid and battery electric compact SUV for the European market, rebadged BYD Song Plus
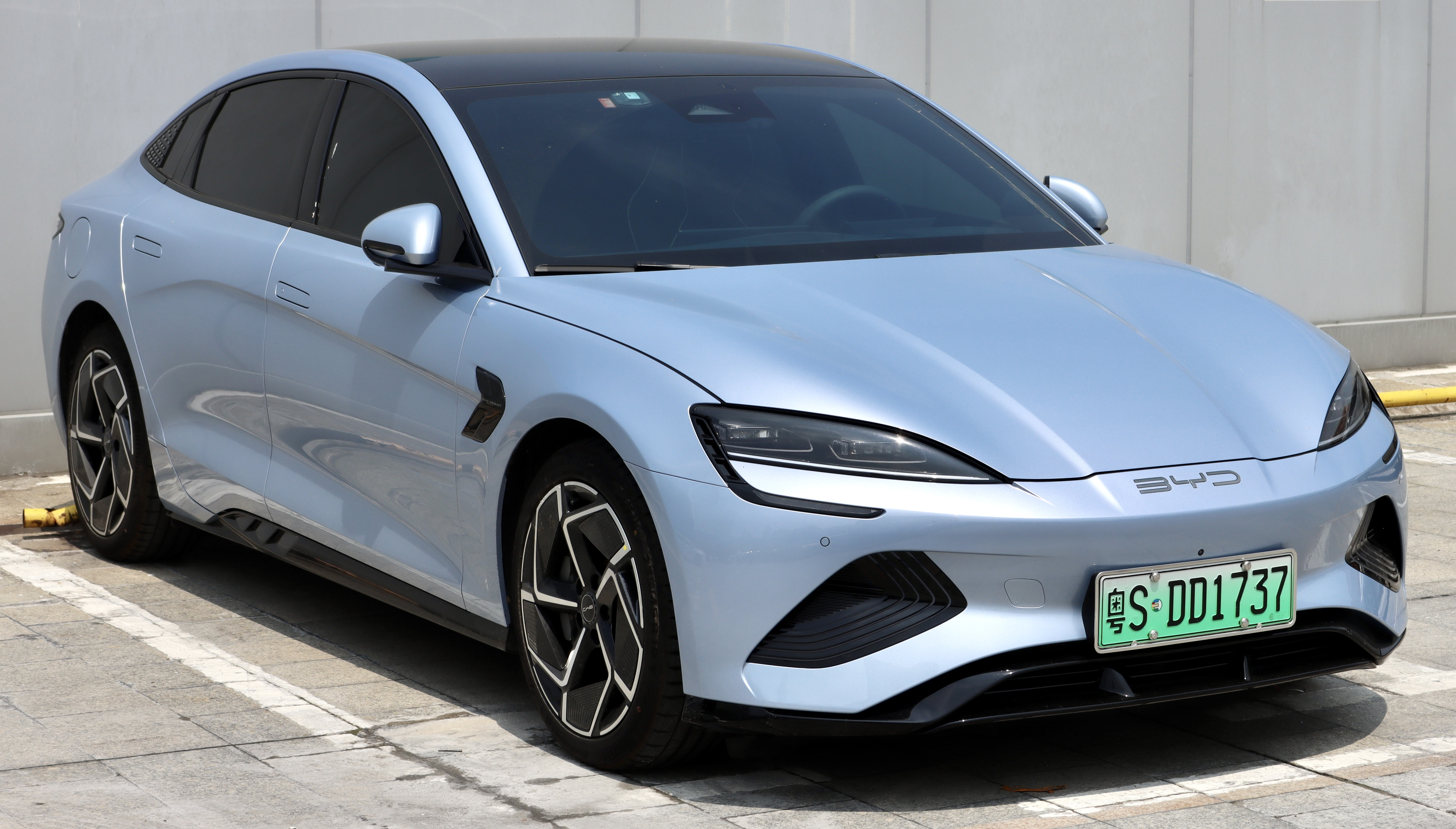
BYD Seal

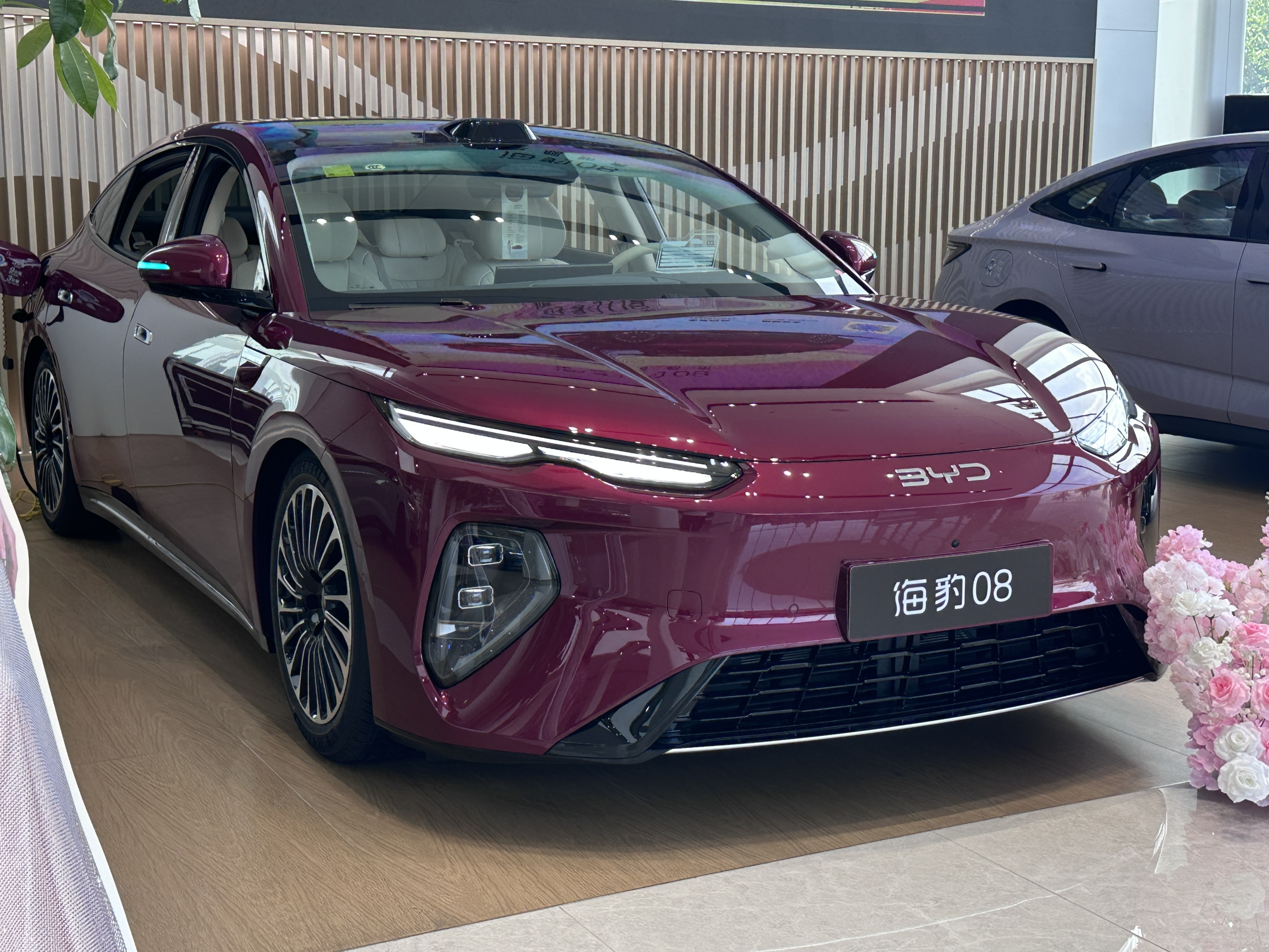
BYD Seal 08

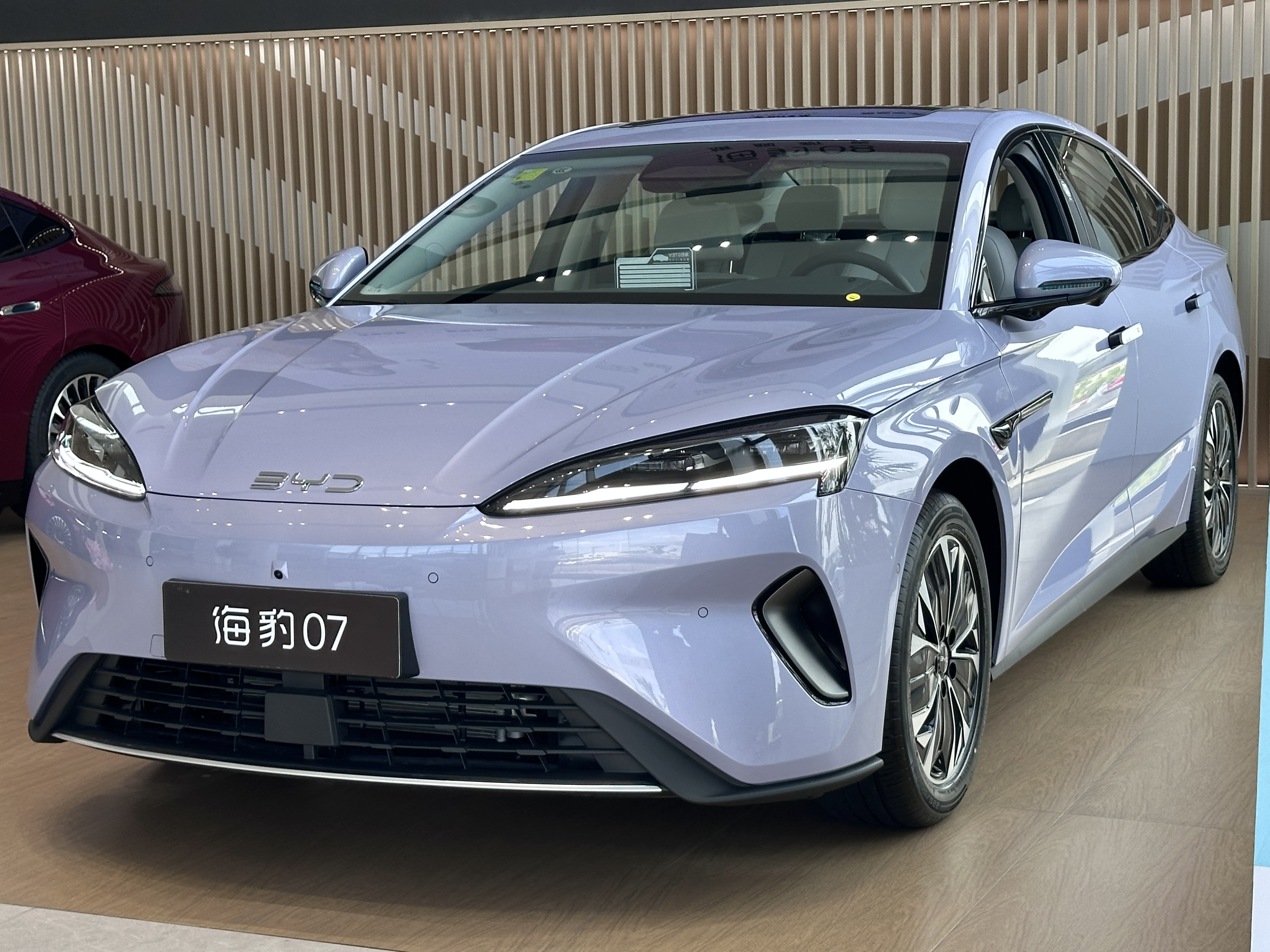
BYD Seal DM-i / Seal 07 DM-i

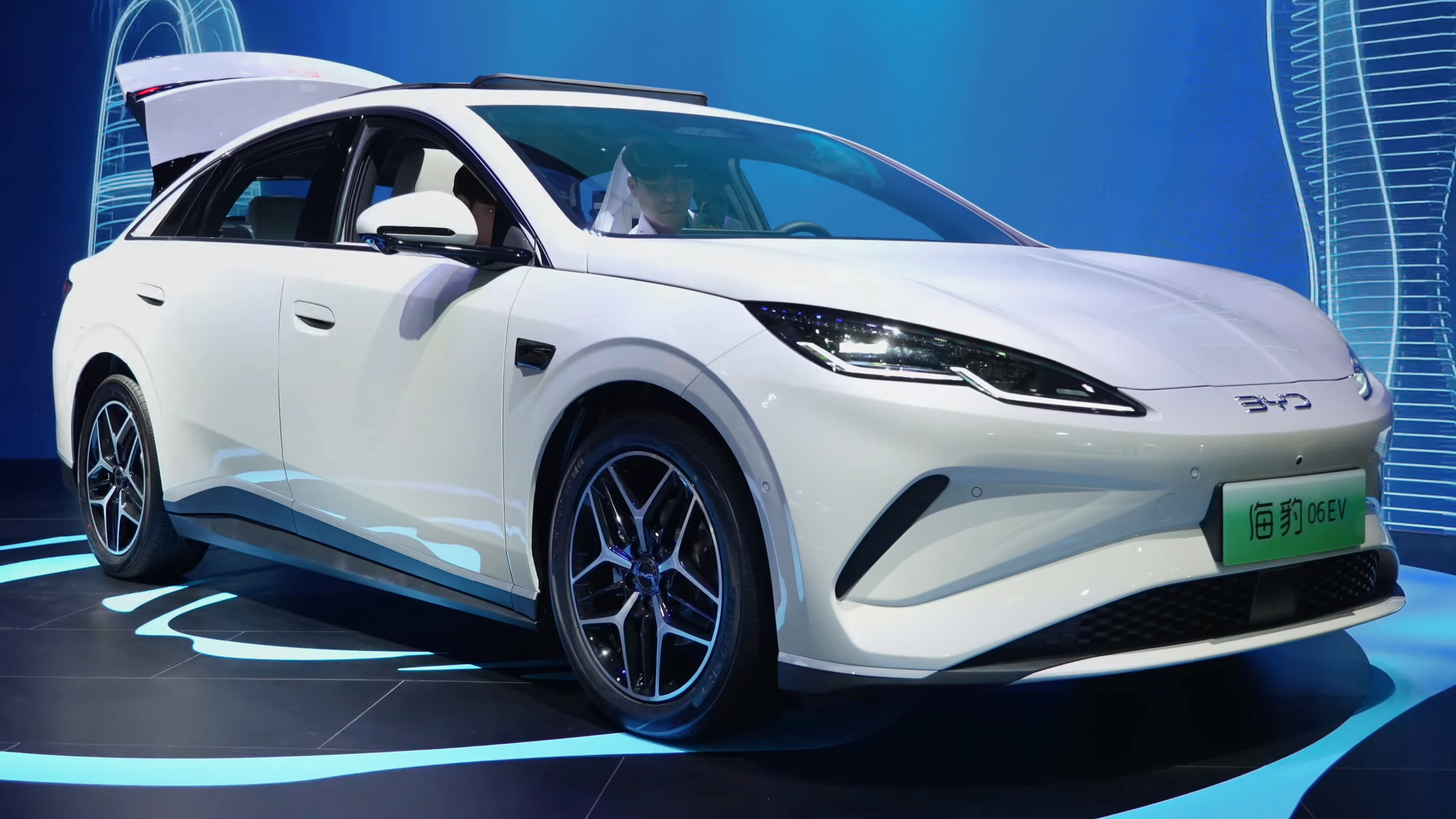
BYD Seal 06 EV

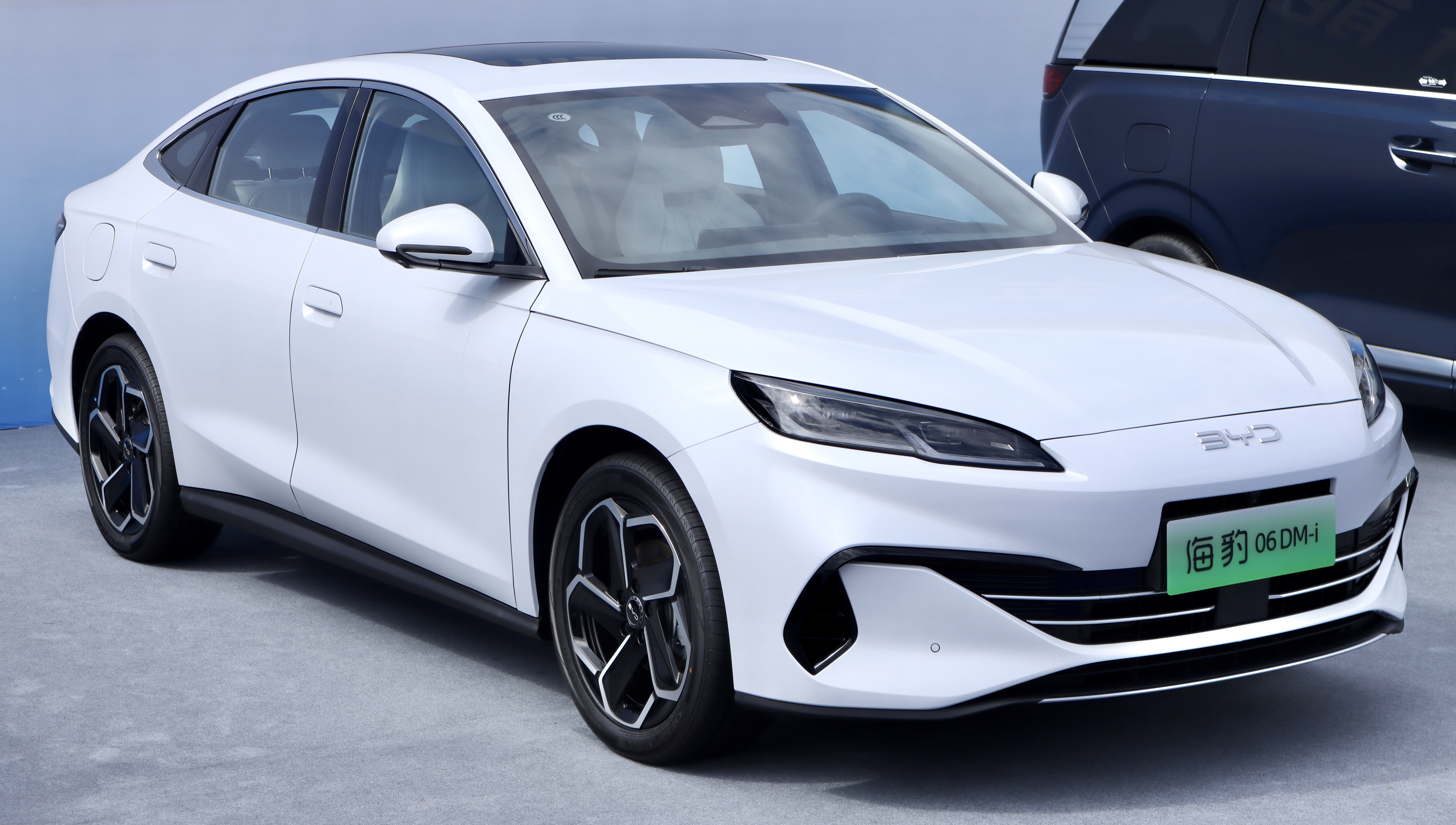
BYD Seal 06 DM-i

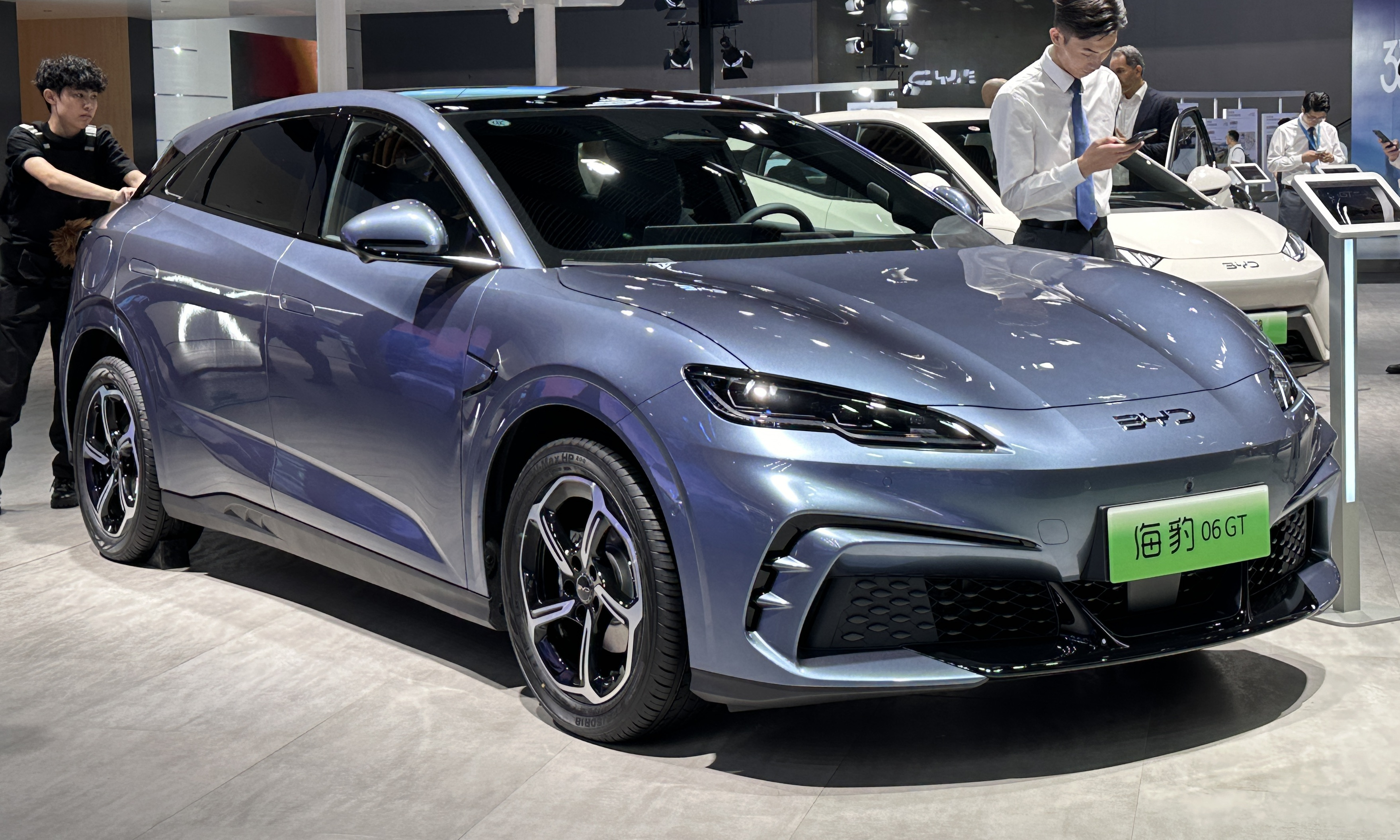
BYD Seal 06 GT

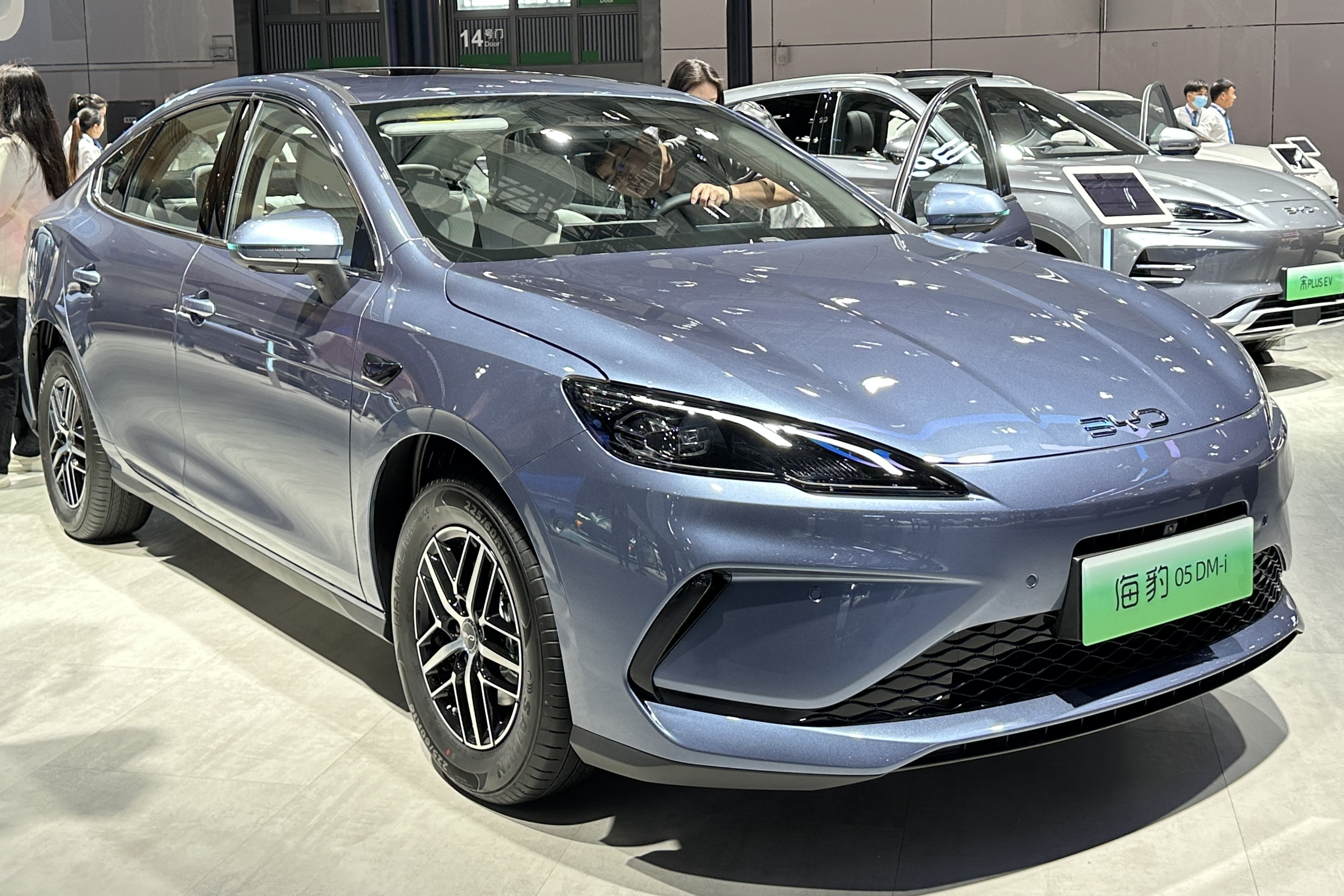
BYD Seal 05 DM-i

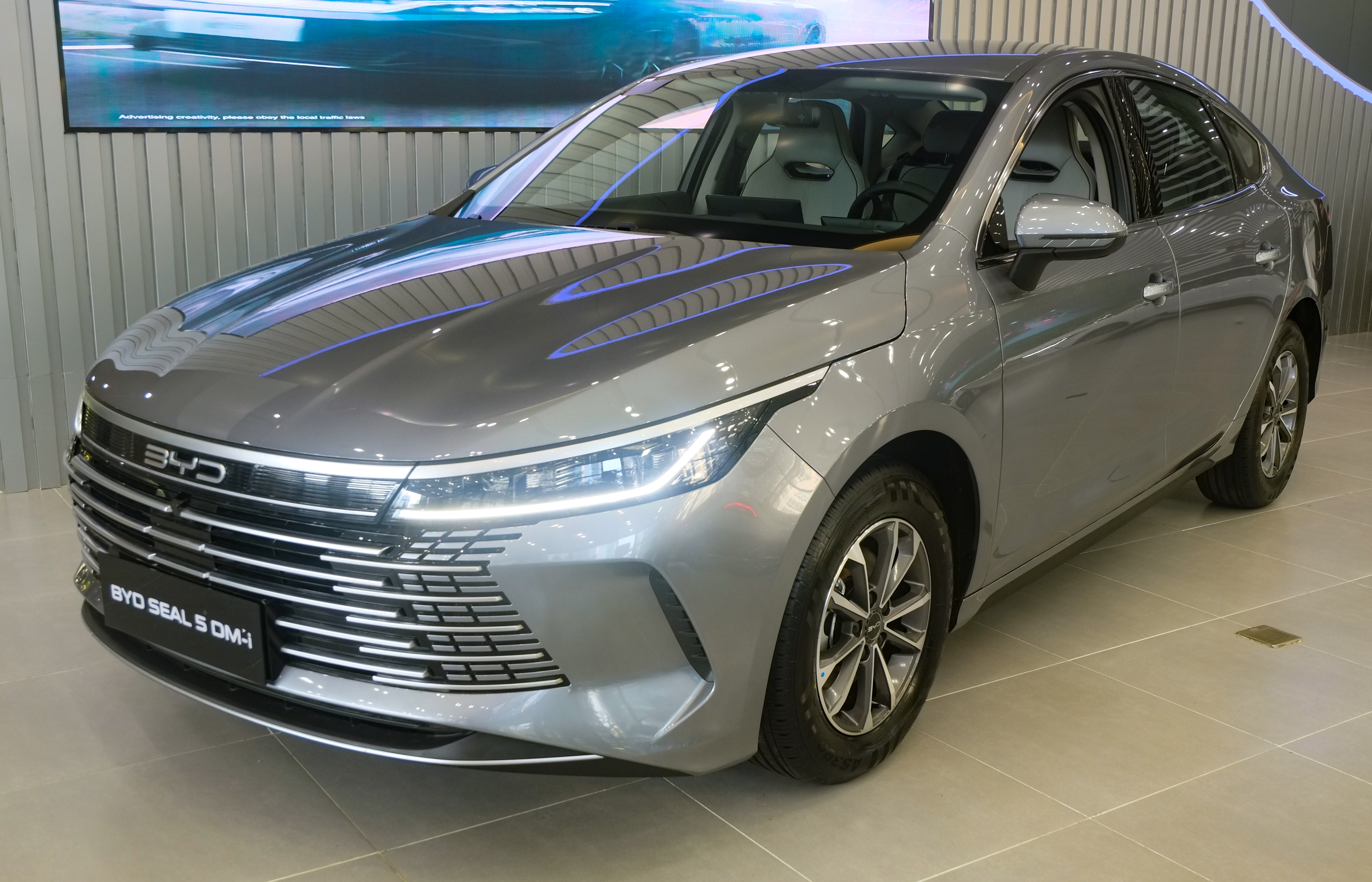
BYD Seal 5 DM-i

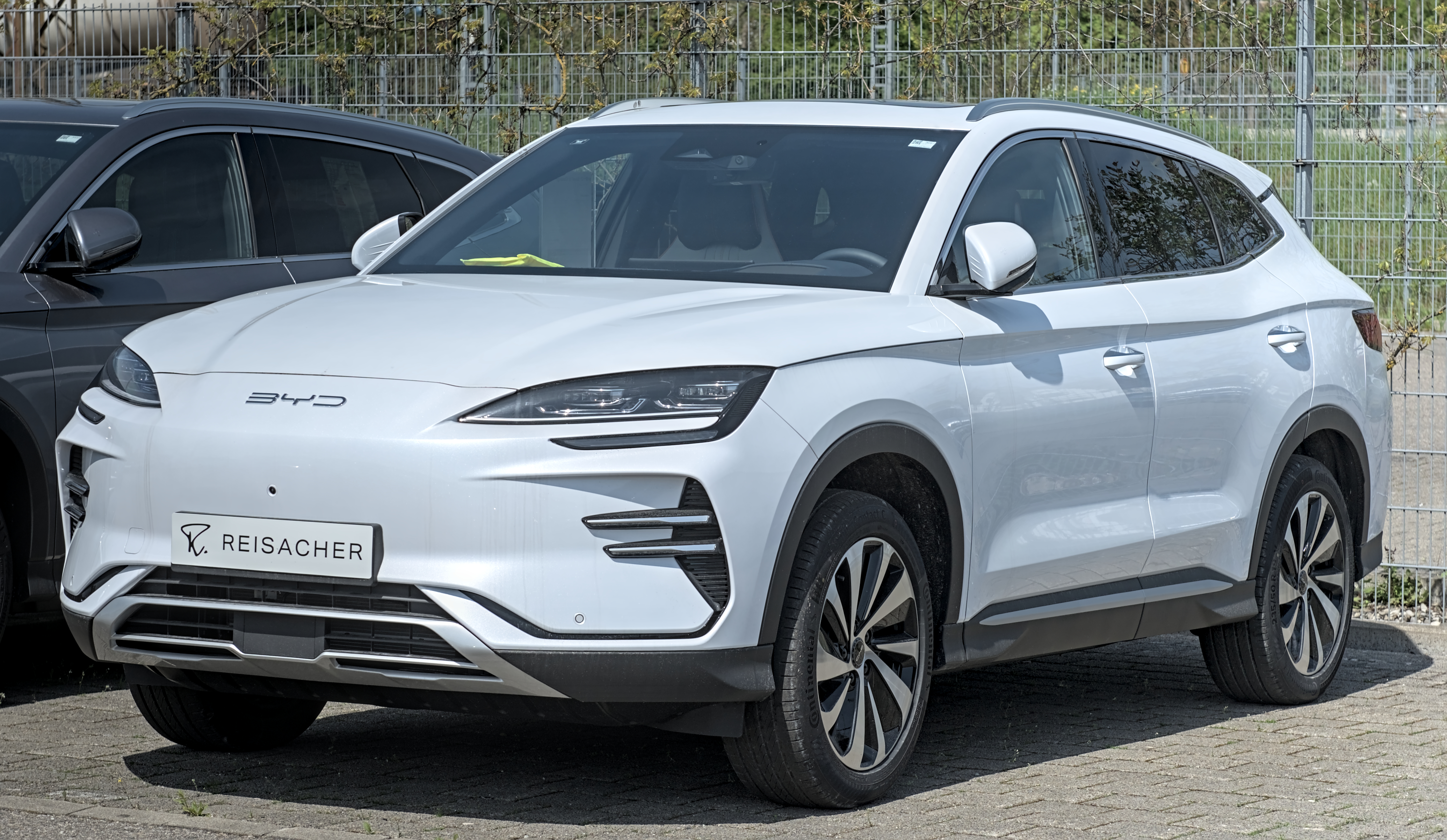
BYD Seal U

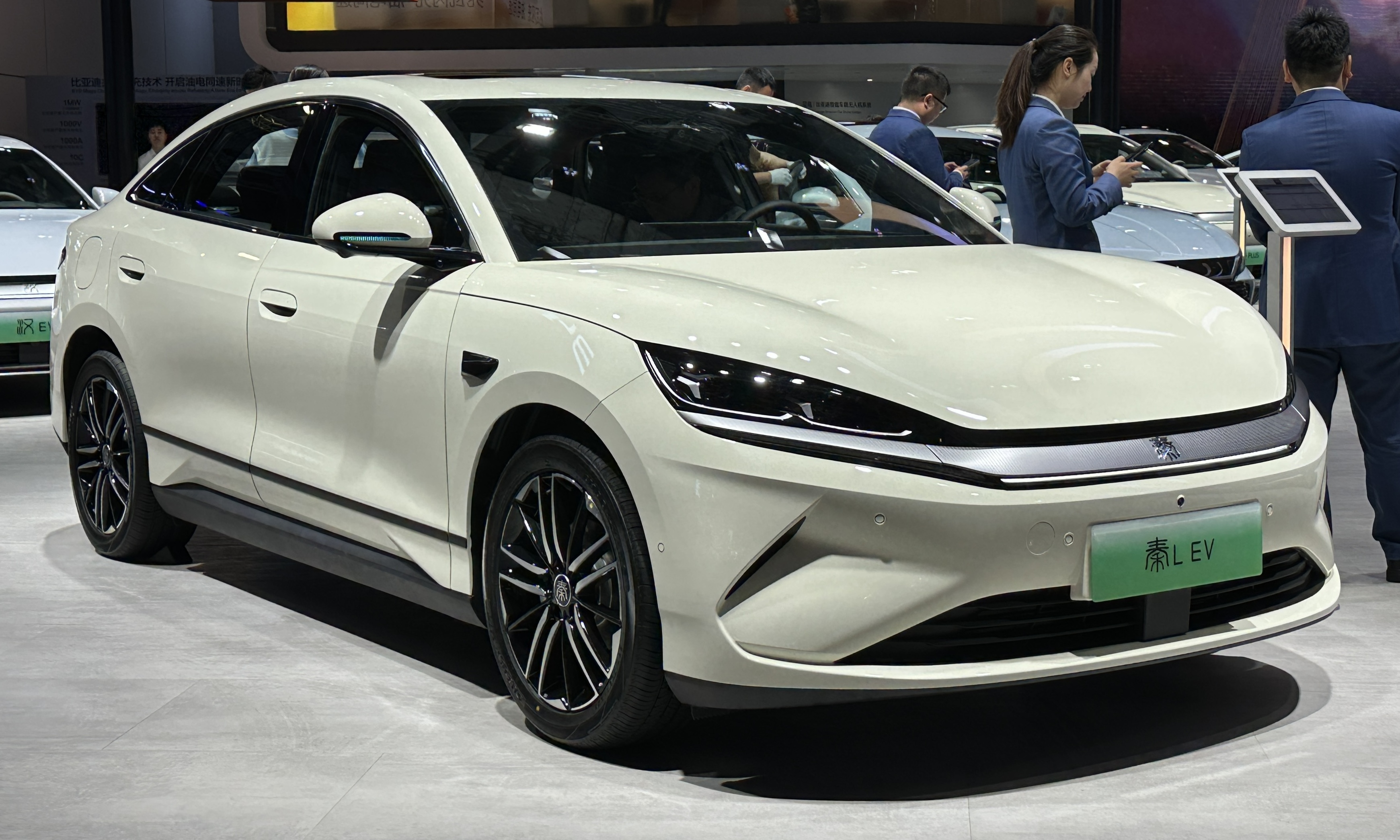
BYD Seal 6 EV

== See also ==
- BYD Sealion
- List of BYD Auto vehicles
