= BYD Qin Plus =

Qin Plus
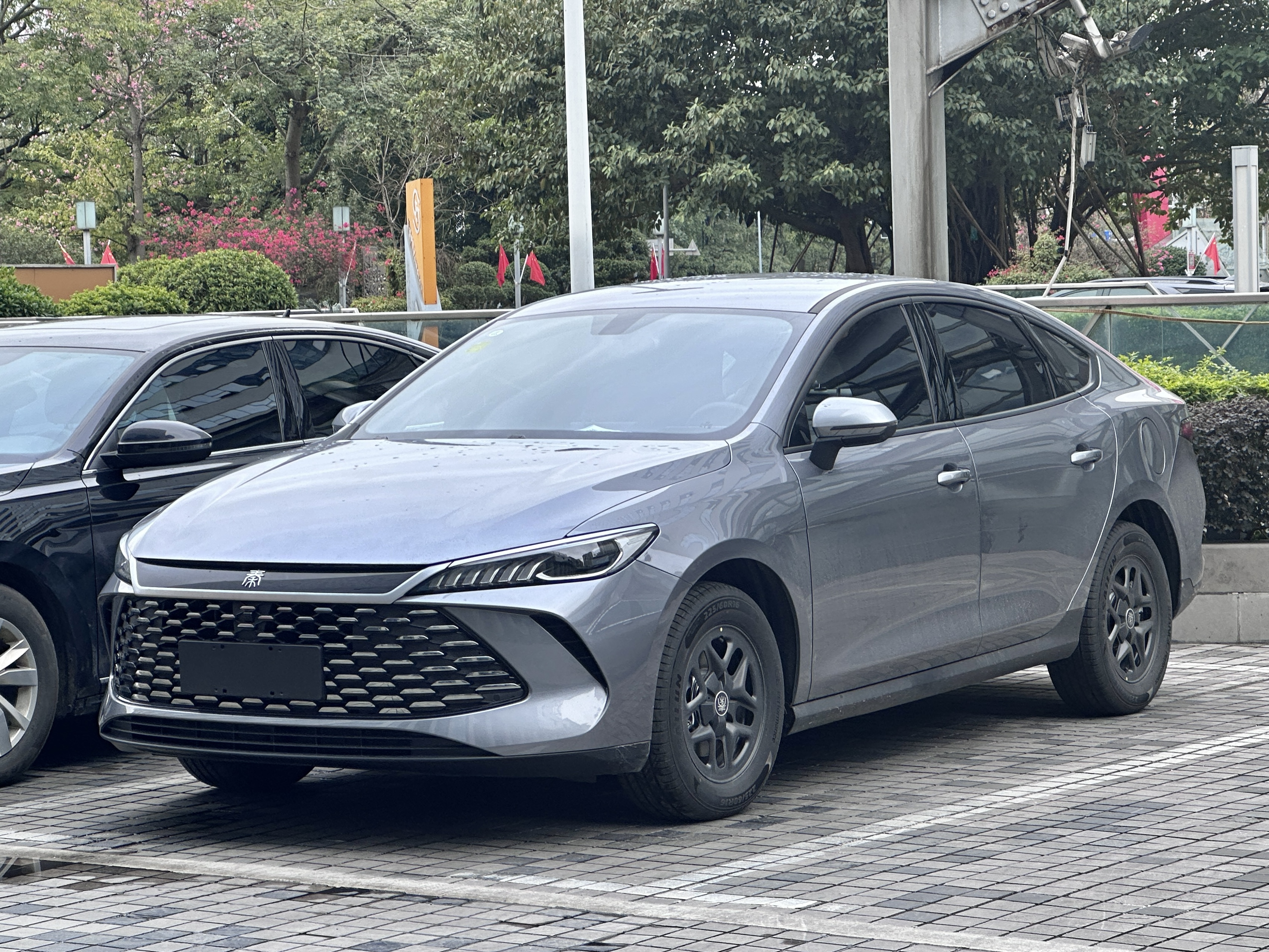
- MY2026 BYD Qin Plus DM-i

Overview
- Manufacturer: BYD Auto
- Production: March 2021 – present

Body and chassis
- Class: Compact car / small family car (C-segment); Mid-size car (D-segment)

Chronology
- Predecessor: BYD Qin Pro

The BYD Qin Plus (Chinese: 比亚迪秦PLUS) is a plug-in hybrid compact and mid-size sedan manufactured by BYD from 2021 onwards. While the first generation is a refreshed version of the Qin Pro sedan, the second generation is completely separate and only shares its name with its predecessor.

== First generation (2021) ==
First generation
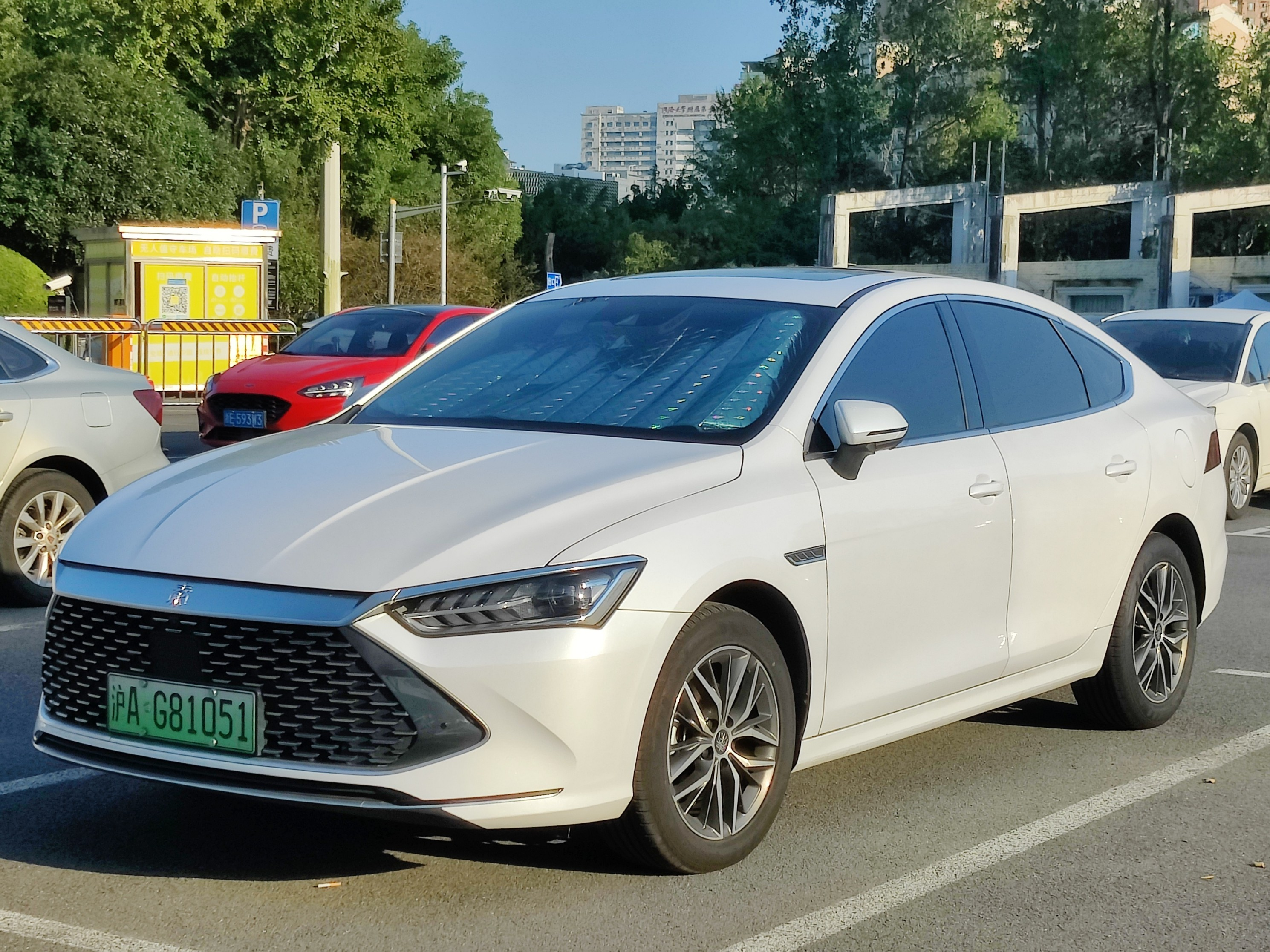

Overview
- Also called: Linghui e5 (2026–present)
- Production: March 2021 – present
- Model years: 2021–2026 (China)
- Assembly: China: Xi'an, Shaanxi; Hefei, Anhui
- Designer: Under the lead of Wolfgang Egger

Body and chassis
- Layout: Front-engine, front-motor, front-wheel drive (DM-i); Front-motor, front-wheel-drive (EV)
- Related: BYD Destroyer 05; BYD Seal 05 DM-i

Powertrain
- Engine: Petrol: 1.5 L BYD476ZQA I4 turbo (2018–2021); Petrol plug-in hybrid: 1.5 L BYD476ZQA I4 turbo (Qin Pro DM); 1.5 L BYD472QA I4 Atkinson cycle (Qin Plus DM-i)
- Electric motor: Permanent magnet synchronous (DM/EV)
- Transmission: E-CVT (DM-i)
- Hybrid drivetrain: Plug-in hybrid (DM-i)

Dimensions
- Wheelbase: 2,718 mm (107.0 in)
- Length: 4,780 mm (188.2 in) (Qin Plus DM-i facelift); 4,795 mm (188.8 in) (Qin Plus EV facelift)
- Width: 1,837 mm (72.3 in)
- Height: 1,495 mm (58.9 in) (DM-i); 1,515 mm (59.6 in) (EV)

The Qin Plus was unveiled during the 2020 Guangzhou Auto Show in November 2020, and went on sale in March 2021. Compared to the Qin Pro, it features restyled front and rear ends, while dimensions are unchanged. It is available as a plug-in hybrid DM-i variant and battery electric version (EV).

BYD started selling a sister model of the Qin Plus DM-i, the Destroyer 05 in March 2022. It is based on the Qin Plus with the same powertrain, with redesigned front and rear fascias and dashboard. While the Qin Plus is sold through Dynasty Network dealerships, the Destroyer 05 is part of the Ocean Network dealership line-up.

=== Qin Plus DM-i ===
The Qin Plus DM-i was launched in January 2021 and went on sale in March 2021 in China. It is one of the first BYD products with its updated plug-in hybrid system, the DM-i, alongside the Tang DM-i and Song Plus DM-i crossovers.

In February 2023, BYD introduced the Qin Plus DM-i Champion Edition with a reduced price. In February 2024, BYD reduced the price of the vehicle further by introducing the Qin Plus DM-i Honor Edition. The company remarked that it is "officially opening a new era of electricity (vehicle) is lower than oil (petrol-powered vehicle)."

From February 2024, BYD started selling the Qin Plus DM-i in some Middle East markets such as the United Arab Emirates, Saudi Arabia and Qatar as the Qin Plus PHEV.

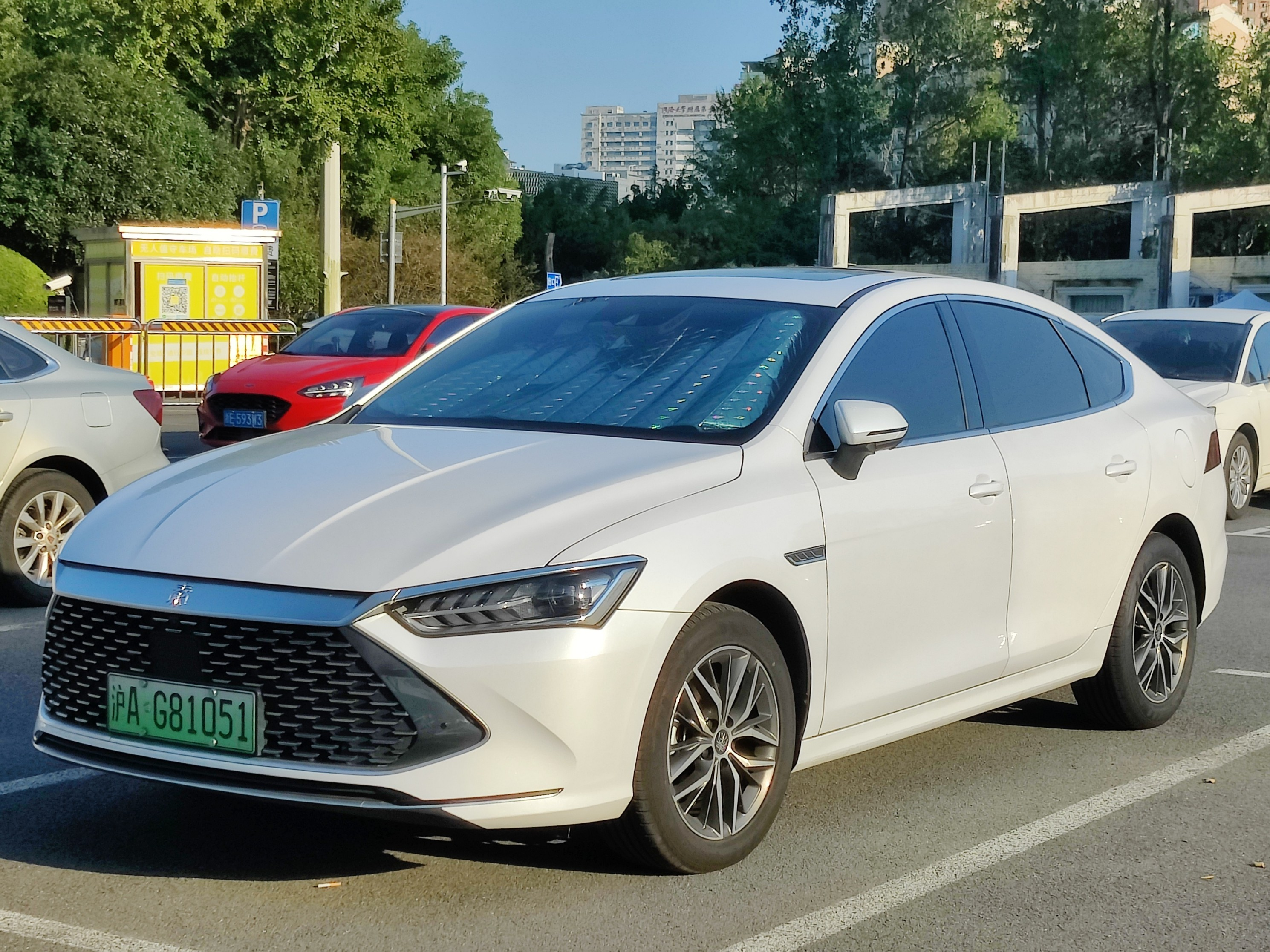
2021–2024 BYD Qin Plus DM-i

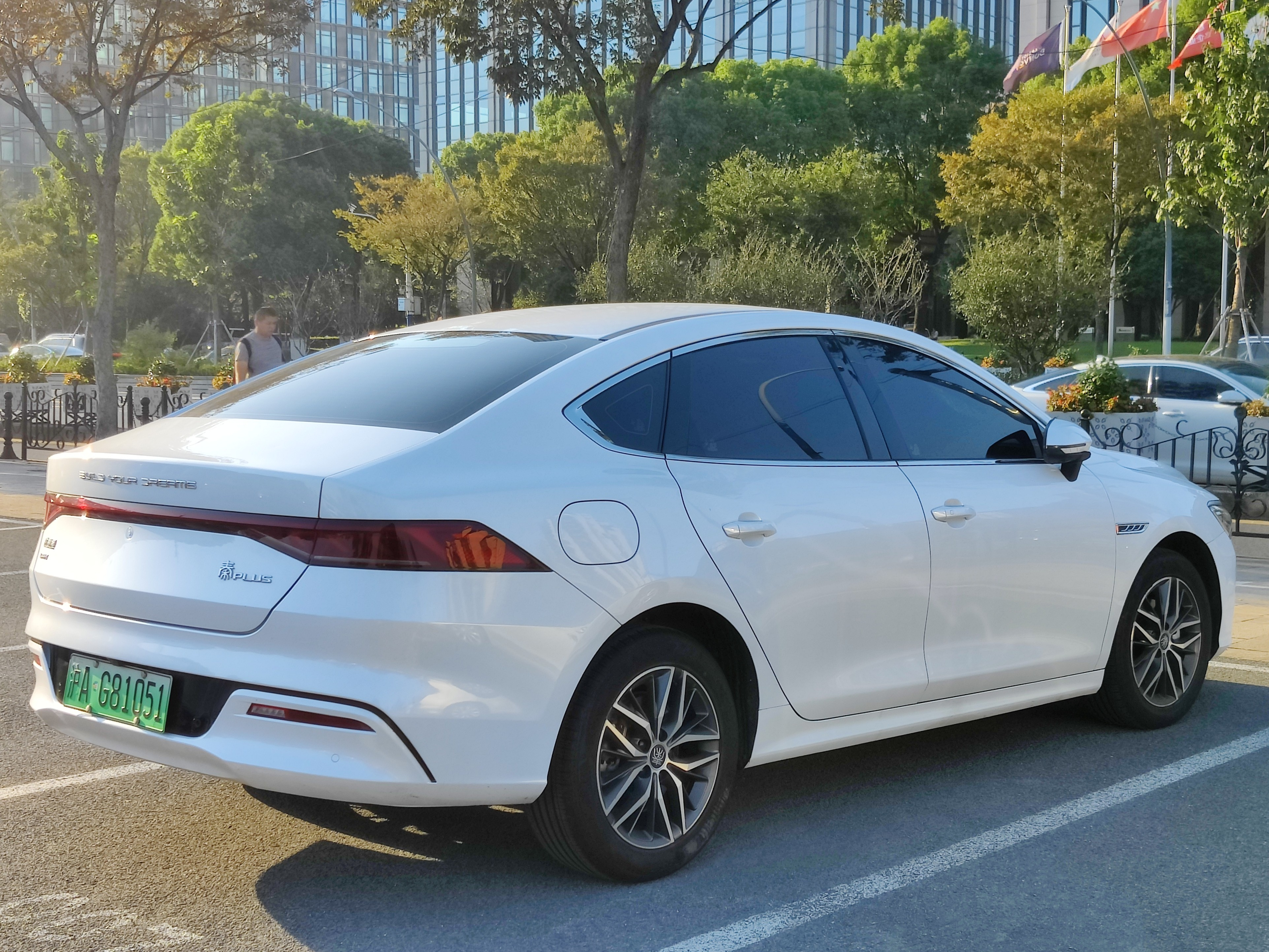
Rear view

==== Powertrain ====
The DM-i powertrain of the Qin Plus combines a 1.5-litre naturally aspirated engine with a single electric motor for a total output of about 170 hp (127 kW; 172 PS). The engine's thermal efficiency ratio is claimed to be at the industry-leading 43% as of 2021. Fuel consumption of the Qin Plus does not exceed 3.8 L/100 km (26 km/l; 62 mpg_{‑US}). Its blade battery provides an electric range of 50–120 km (31–75 mi).

The 1.5-litre naturally aspirated engine of the Qin Plus DM-i uses the Atkinson cycle and features cooled exhaust gas recirculation (EGR), a split cooling system (the engine cooling circuit is split into two parts, one for the cylinder head and one for the block) and an electric water pump. The engine develops a maximum power output of 81 kW (109 hp; 110 PS) at 6000 rpm, and the peak torque is 135 N⋅m (100 lb⋅ft; 14 kg⋅m) at 4500 rpm. The compression ratio is 15.5:1. The car is equipped with an E-CVT transmission.

| Type | Engine | | | Trans. | Battery | Layout | Electric motor | | | 0–100 km/h (0–62 mph) (claimed) | Electric range (claimed) | | Calendar years |
| Type | Displ. | Power | Torque | Trans. | Battery | Layout | Type | Power | Torque | 0–100 km/h (0–62 mph) (claimed) | NEDC | WLTC | Calendar years |
|---|---|---|---|---|---|---|---|---|---|---|---|---|---|
| 1.5L 55 km DM-i | BYD472QA 1,498 cc (1.5 L) I4 | 81 kW (109 hp) | 135 N⋅m (13.8 kg⋅m; 99.6 lb⋅ft) | E-CVT | 8.32 kWh LFP Blade battery | FWD | PMSM | 132 kW (177 hp) | 316 N⋅m (233 lb⋅ft) | 7.9 seconds | 55 km (34 mi) | 46 km (29 mi) | 2021–present |
| 1.5L 120 km DM-i | BYD472QA 1,498 cc (1.5 L) I4 | 81 kW (109 hp) | 135 N⋅m (13.8 kg⋅m; 99.6 lb⋅ft) | E-CVT | 18.32 kWh LFP Blade battery | FWD | PMSM | 145 kW (194 hp) | 325 N⋅m (240 lb⋅ft) | 7.3 seconds | 120 km (75 mi) | 101 km (63 mi) | 2021–present |

==== Qin Plus EV ====
The top version features a 71.7 kWh battery with 600 km (373 mi) range. Versions with battery capacities of 47.5 and 57 kWh are also available, with ranges of 400 and 500 kilometres (249 and 311 mi) respectively.

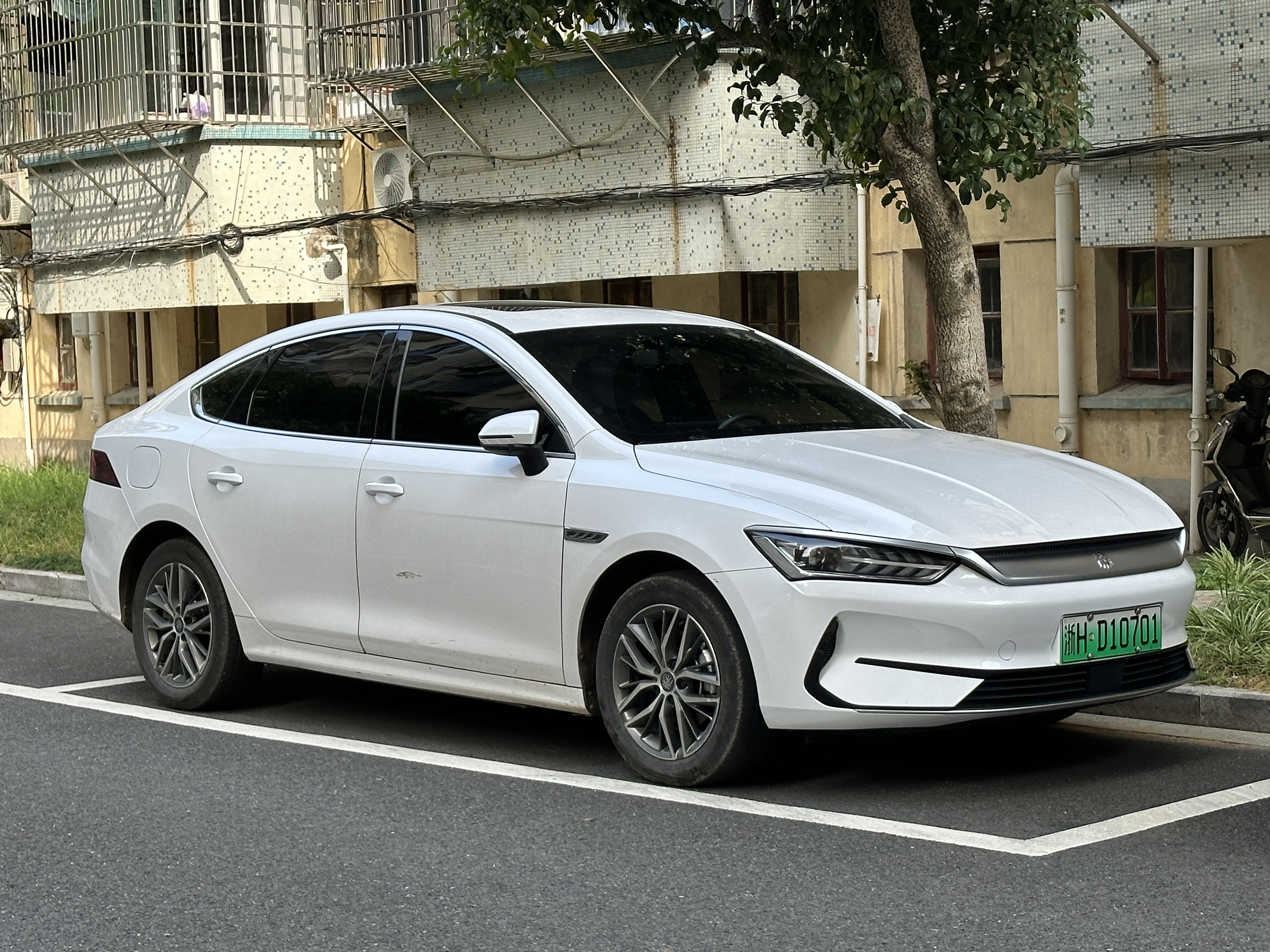
2021–2024 BYD Qin Plus EV

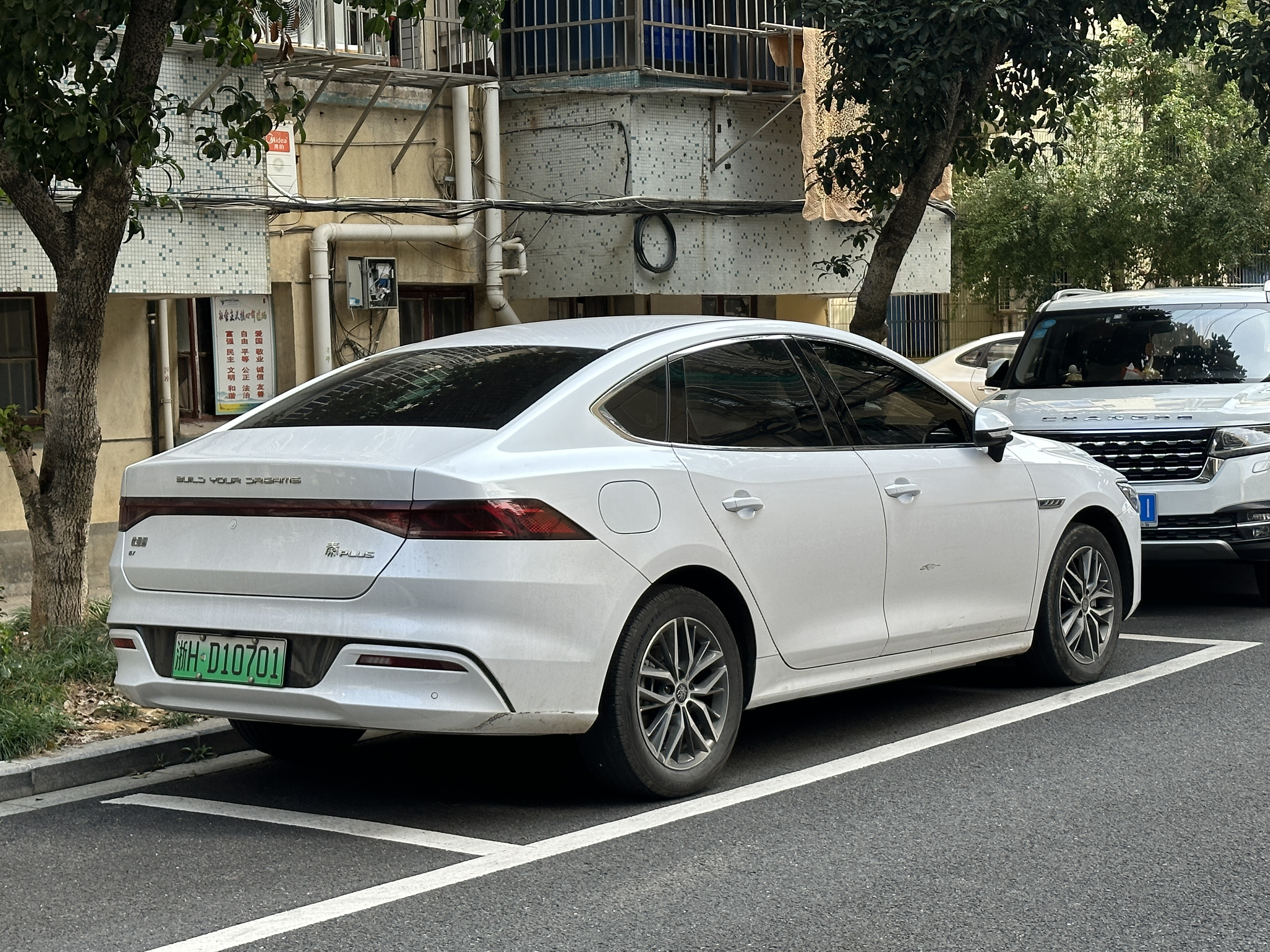
Rear view

=== Facelift (2025) ===
The Qin Plus DM-i underwent a major facelift in January 2025, featuring a redesigned front fascia inspired by the Qin L DM-i, a revised rear design, and a refreshed interior. It also received the updated DM-i 5.0 plug-in hybrid system. The Seal 05 DM-i became its Ocean Series counterpart, replacing the Destroyer 05.

The Qin Plus EV also received a similar facelift at the same time, though its front fascia lacks the large grille of the DM-i version.

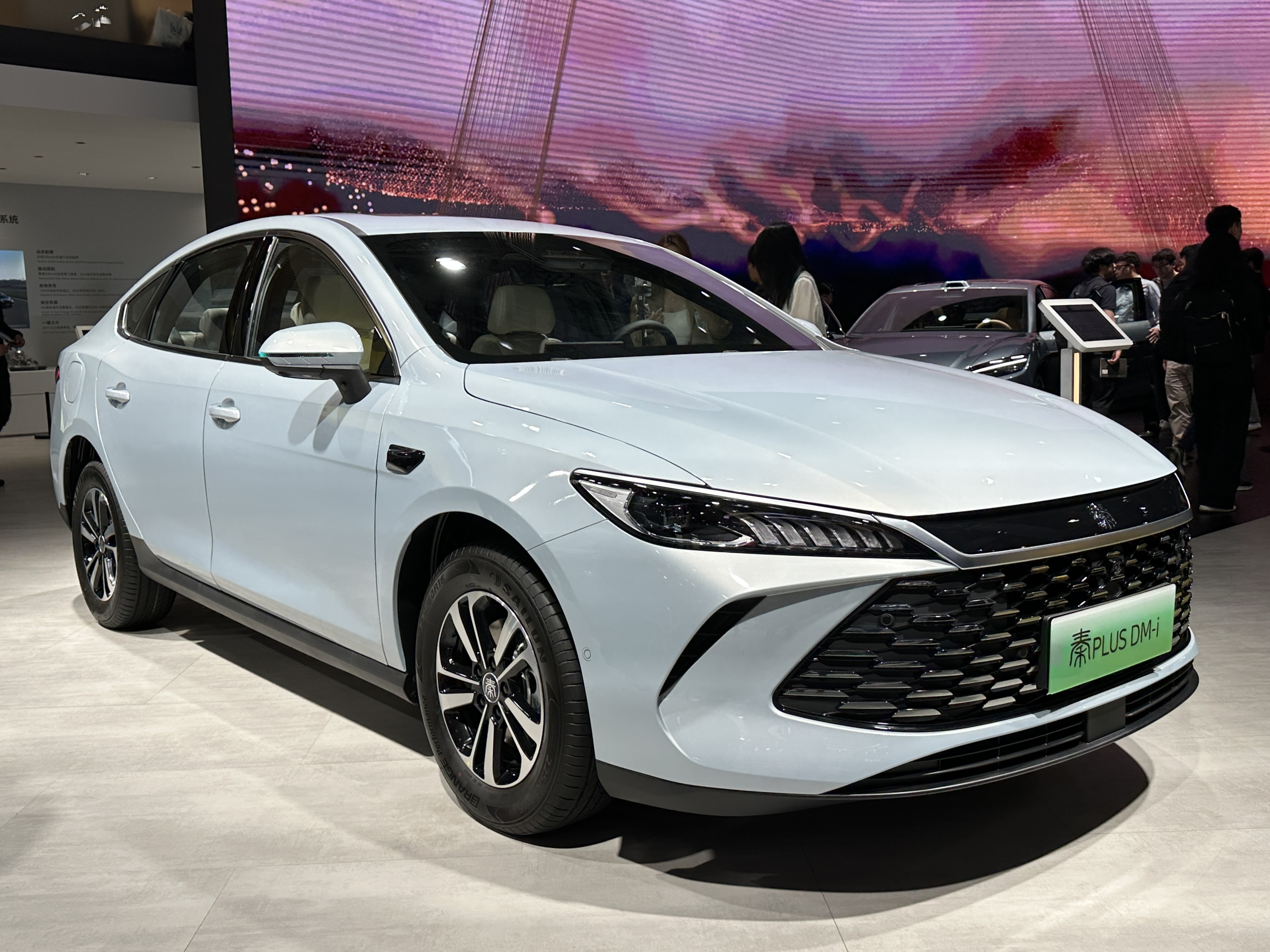
2025 BYD Qin Plus DM-i

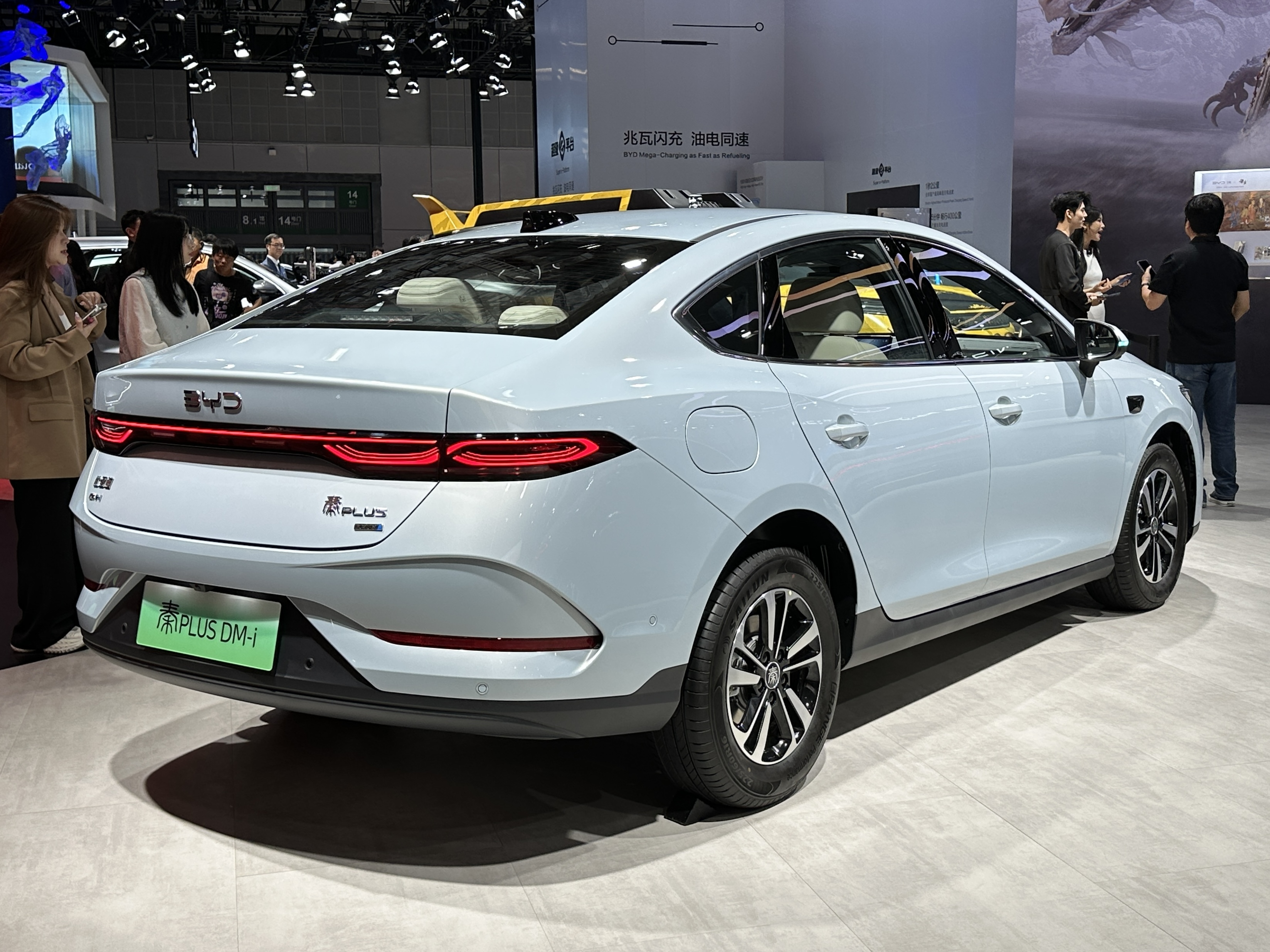
Rear view

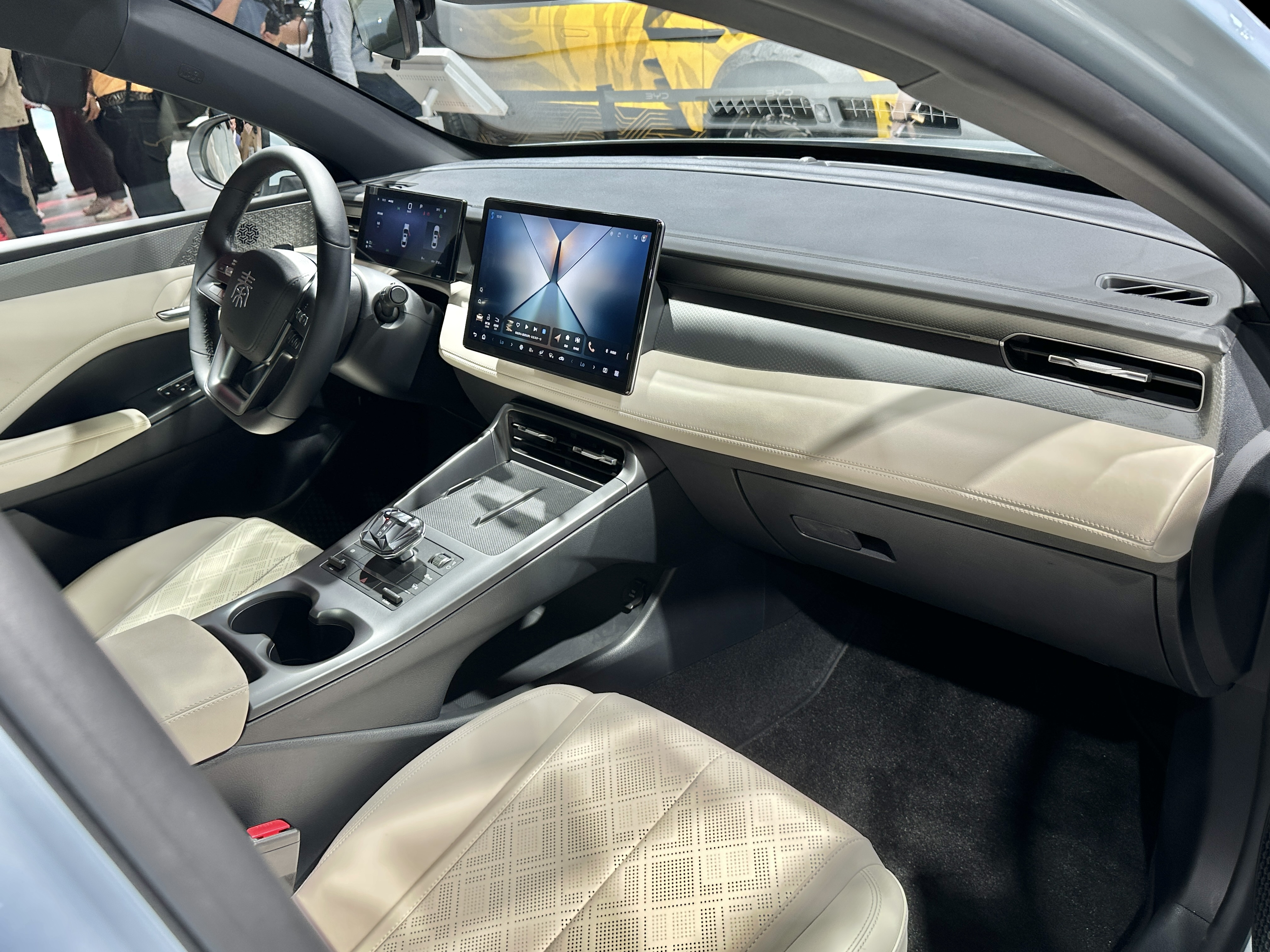
Interior

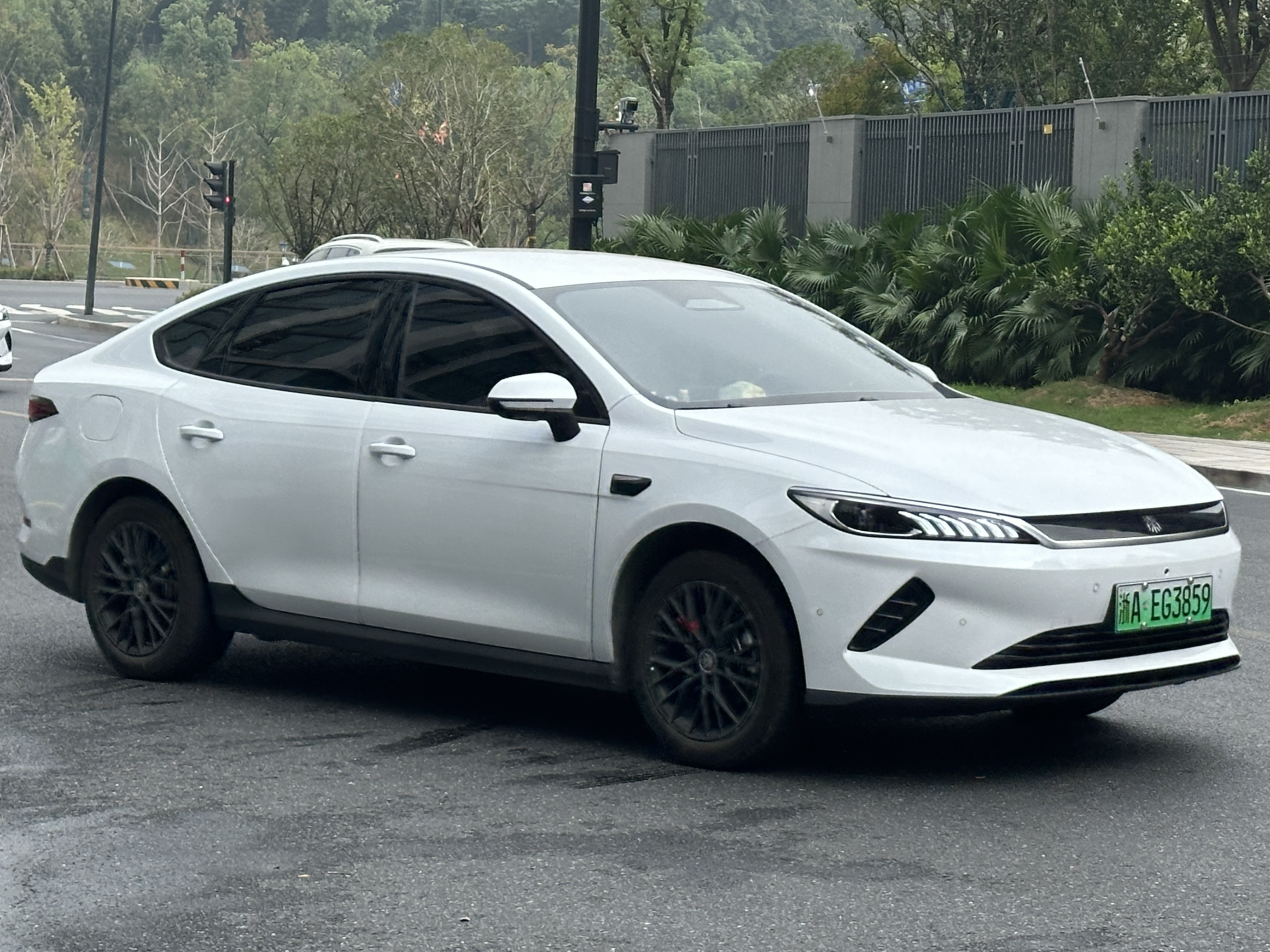
2025 BYD Qin Plus EV

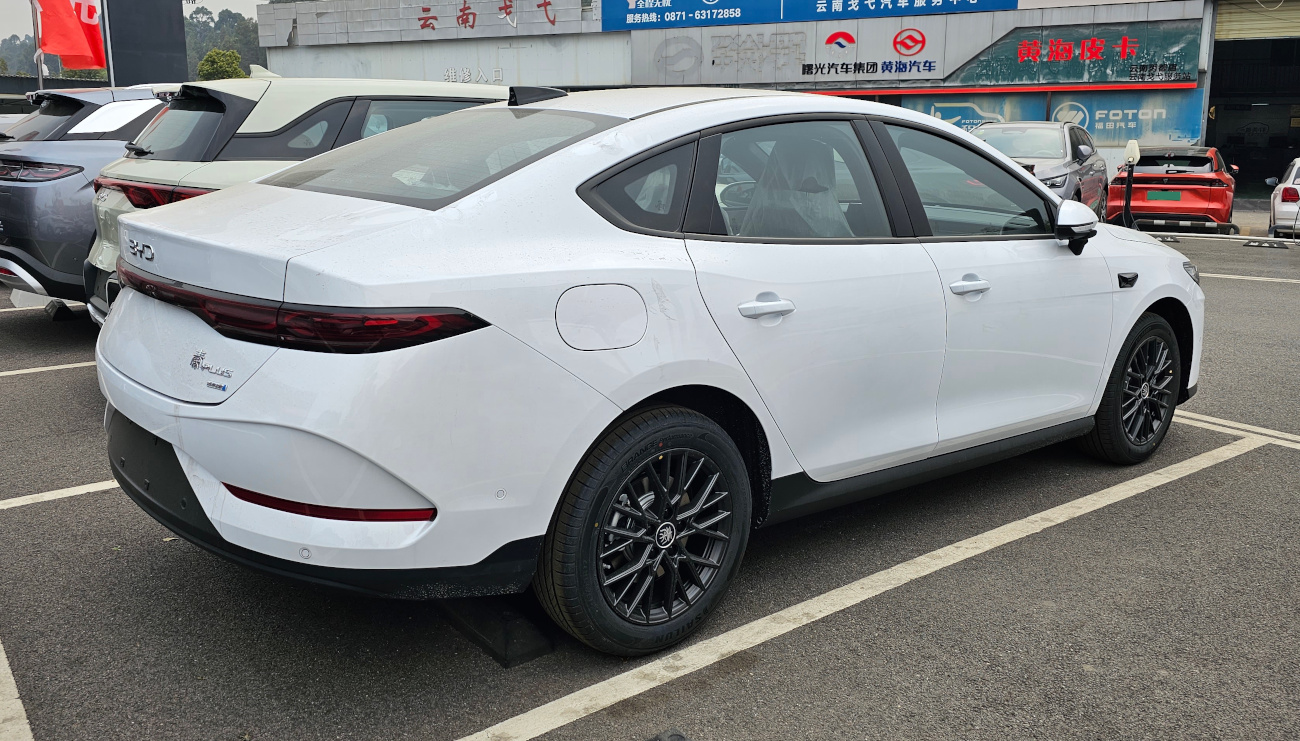
Rear view

=== Linghui e5 ===
Images of a Linghui e5 was revealed by the MIIT on January 9, 2026, it is essentially a rebadged variant of a pre-facelift Qin Plus EV that is now part of a ride-hailing services. The e5 received changes include the black chrome on a front bumper and a Linghui logo.

=== Safety ===
C-NCAP (2018) test results 2019 BYD Qin Pro EV Intelligent Link Leader
| Category | | % |
|---|---|---|
| Overall: | 5 /5 stars | 84.5% |
| Occupant protection: | | 85.55% |
| Vulnerable road users: | | 72.41% |
| Active safety: | | 91.40% |

== Second generation (2026) ==
Second generation

Overview
- Production: 2026–present
- Model years: 2027–present (China)

Body and chassis
- Class: Mid-size car (D-segment)
- Body style: 4-door sedan
- Platform: DM-i 5.0 platform
- Related: BYD Qin L DM-i

Dimensions
- Wheelbase: 2,718 mm (107.0 in)
- Length: 4,840 mm (190.6 in)
- Width: 1,900 mm (74.8 in)
- Height: 1,498 mm (59.0 in)

The second-generation Qin Plus was revealed in filings with China's Ministry of Industry and Information Technology (MIIT) on 10 July 2026. It now shares its body with the BYD Qin L DM-i, meaning a significant increase in dimensions that makes it a mid-size sedan rather than a compact.

An evolution of BYD's "Loong (dragon) face" design language has been used. While most design elements such as the side profile and Chinese knot-inspired taillights are unchanged from the Qin L DM-i, the front has been updated to more closely resemble the latest Dynasty series models.

The interior has been completely redesigned, featuring a 12.8-inch central display, LCD instrument cluster, two-spoke steering wheel shared with a number of new models, and a column-mounted gear shifter. Additional equipment include a panoramic sunroof, ambient lighting and a 6-speaker sound system.

Two plug-in hybrid DM-i variants share a 1.5-liter naturally aspirated engine paired with an electric motor, producing 74 kW (99 hp; 101 PS) and 120 kW (160 hp; 160 PS) respectively, while using BYD's second-generation Blade (LFP) battery. Two battery capacities are available – 16.2 kWh and 24.3 kWh which allow for a pure electric range of 140 km (87 mi) and 220 km (140 mi) respectively. Using a 65-liter gas tank, combined range can reach up to 2,290 km (1,420 mi). According to BYD, a charge from 30% to 80% requires 20 minutes.

Meanwhile, a battery electric EV variant have been filed, utilizing a single motor that produces 100 kW (130 hp; 140 PS) and reaches a top speed of 170 km/h (110 mph).
