= BYD Seal 05 DM-i =

Plug-in hybrid compact sedan

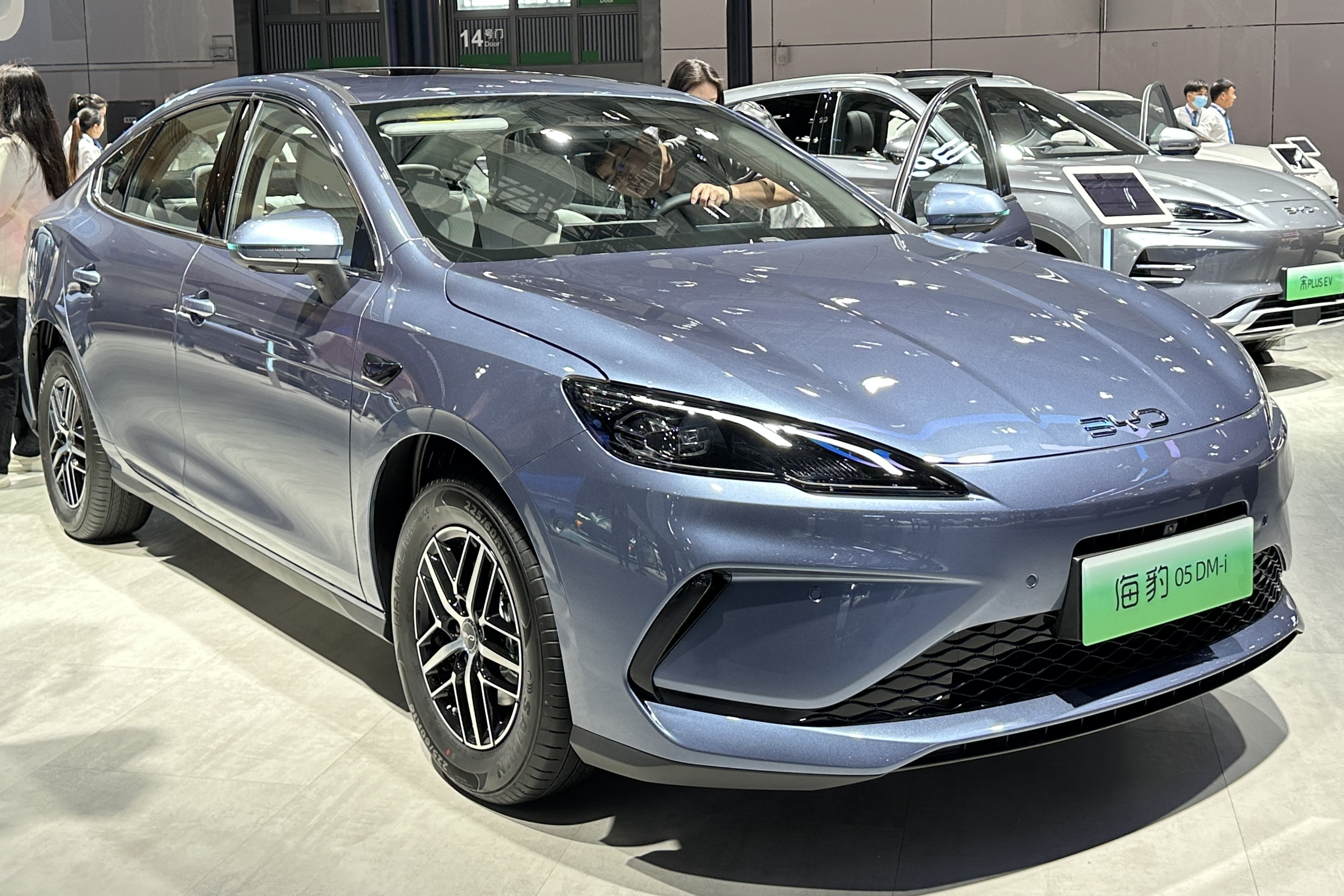

Overview
- Manufacturer: BYD Auto
- Model code: HA6
- Also called: BYD Seal 5 DM-i (export); BYD King (Latin America)
- Production: January 2025 – present
- Model years: 2025–2026 (China)
- Assembly: China: Changsha, Hunan; Hefei, Anhui; Shenzhen, Guangdong; Jinan, Shandong
- Designer: Under the lead of Wolfgang Egger

Body and chassis
- Class: Compact car (C-segment)
- Body style: 4-door sedan
- Layout: Front-engine, front-motor, front-wheel drive
- Platform: DM-i 5.0 platform
- Related: BYD Destroyer 05 / Chasor / King / Seal 5 DM-i; BYD Qin Plus

Powertrain
- Engine: Petrol plug-in hybrid: 1.5 L BYD472QC I4 Atkinson cycle
- Electric motor: 120 kW (161 hp) Permanent magnet synchronous
- Power output: 155 kW (208 hp; 211 PS) (Combined)
- Transmission: E-CVT
- Hybrid drivetrain: Plug-in hybrid
- Battery: 7.42 kWh BYD Blade LFP (Philippines); ~7.68 to 25.28 kWh BYD Blade LFP (China)
- Range: 1,600 km (994 mi)

Dimensions
- Wheelbase: 2,718 mm (107.0 in)
- Length: 4,780 mm (188.2 in)
- Width: 1,837 mm (72.3 in)
- Height: 1,515 mm (59.6 in)
- Curb weight: 1,480–1,580 kg (3,263–3,483 lb)

Chronology
- Predecessor: BYD Destroyer 05 (China)

The BYD Seal 05 DM-i (Chinese: 比亚迪海豹05DM-i; pinyin: Bǐyǎdí Hǎibào 05 DM-i) is a plug-in hybrid compact sedan manufactured by BYD Auto since 2025. Part of the Seal family, it is a restyled and updated version of the BYD Destroyer 05, both part of the Ocean Series product line-up that are distributed through Ocean Network dealerships. It is the sister model to the BYD Qin Plus from the Dynasty Series.

== Overview ==
The Seal 05 DM-i debuted in January 2025. It adopts BYD's fifth-generation plug-in hybrid system. Pre-sales for the Seal 05 DM-i started on 7 January 2025, and later launched on 10 February 2025 with three variants.

As a result of being the facelifted version of the Destroyer 05, which is heavily related to the Qin Plus, the Seal 05 DM-i continues to the same body as that model and only differs in its restyled front and rear fascias, and the redesigned interior.

The exterior of the Seal 05 DM-i adopts the BYD’s Ocean series design language. The front fascia features double wave-shaped LED headlights, a blacked-out trapezoidal grille and U-shaped air inlets. The rear fascia features a full-width LED light bar, ducktail spoiler, and hidden exhaust outlets. Additional exterior features include a triple camera on the front windshield, rear-facing cameras on the front fenders, and side door mirror cameras.

The interior is available in either a grey or beige colour scheme. The dashboard features a three-spoke flat bottom steering wheel, a 8.8-inch LCD digital instrument panel and a 10.1-inch central touchscreen display powered by BYD’s DiLink system. The center console features dual cupholders, wireless charging pads and a row of physical buttons for important vehicle functions.

The Seal 05 DM-i has a trunk capacity of 508 L (17.9 cu ft); the rear seats can be folded down to further expand that.

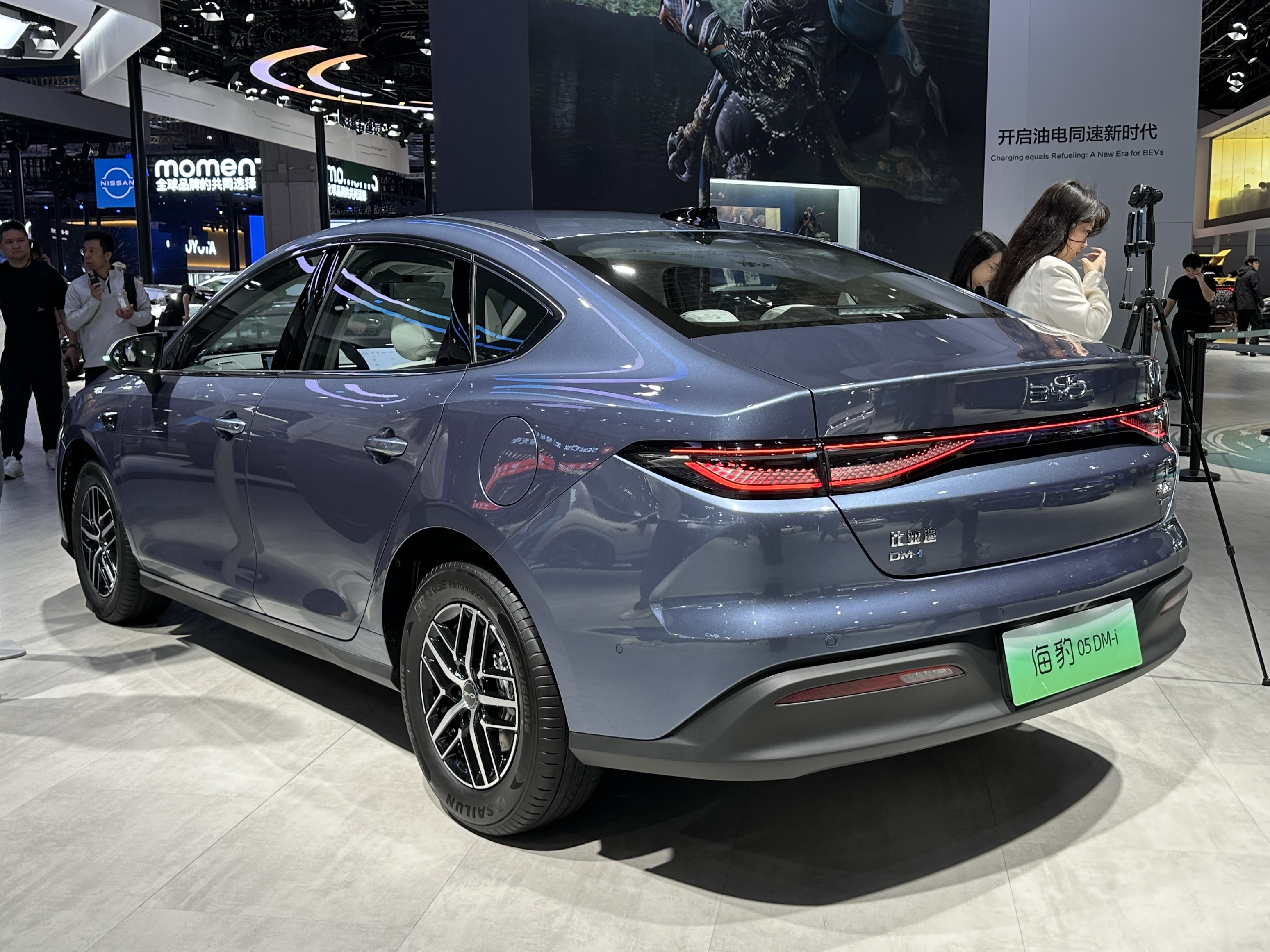
Rear view

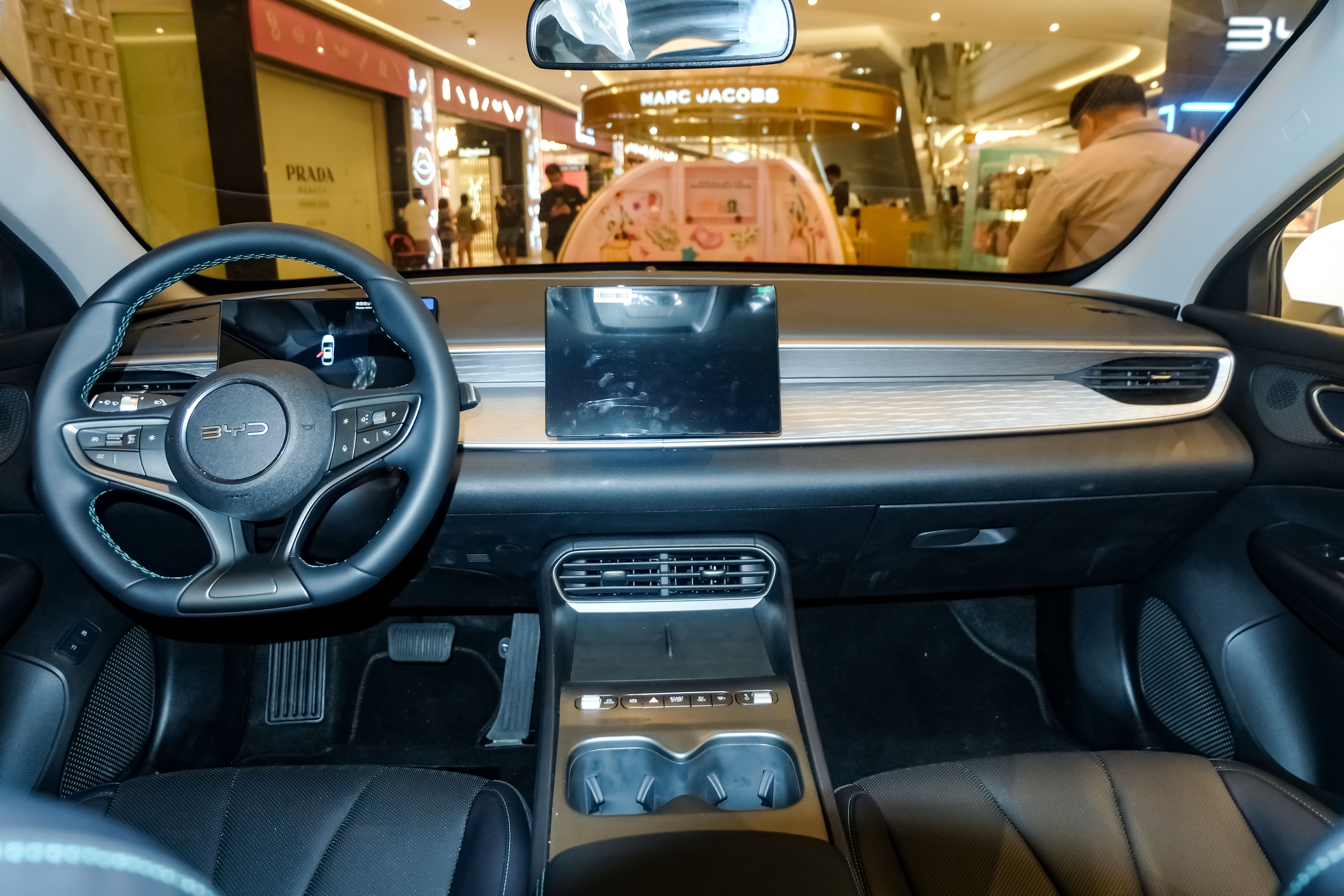
Interior

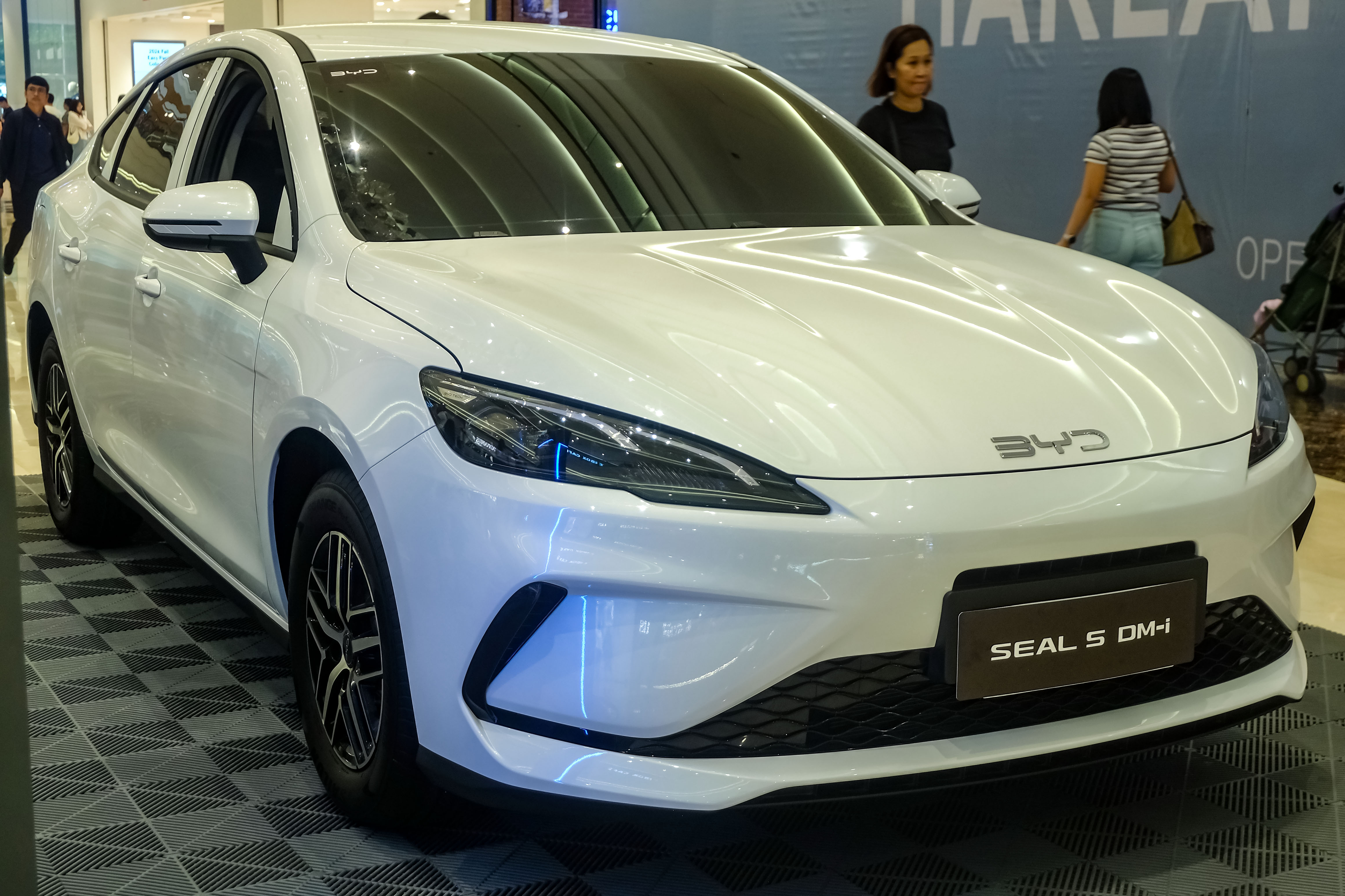
BYD Seal 5 DM-i in the Philippines

=== Powertrain ===
The Seal 05 DM-i uses BYD's fifth-generation DM-i system, which consists of a 1.5L naturally aspirated gasoline engine and a single front-mounted electric motor. Combined, they produce a maximum power output of 194 kW (260 hp; 264 PS) and 336 N⋅m (248 lb⋅ft) of torque. All models are equipped with BYD's 15.87 kWh "Blade" (LFP) battery, providing 128 km (80 mi) of battery electric range and up to 2,000 km (1,200 mi) when used in conjunction with the engine.

== Markets ==
=== Philippines ===
The vehicle is marketed in the Philippines as the Seal 5 DM-i and was launched on 21 November 2024. It was available with two variants: Dynamic and Premium. Priced at ₱998,000 and ₱1,198,000 respectively. In July 2026 new facelift models were introduced: Essential and Dynamic. Features like the 360-degree camera and front parking sensors from the old Premium version were dropped to hit lower price points. Priced at ₱948,000 for the Essential and ₱1,048,000 for the Dynamic.

== Sales ==
Year	China
2025	115,621

== See also ==
- List of BYD Auto vehicles
