= BYD Destroyer 05 =

Compact sedan

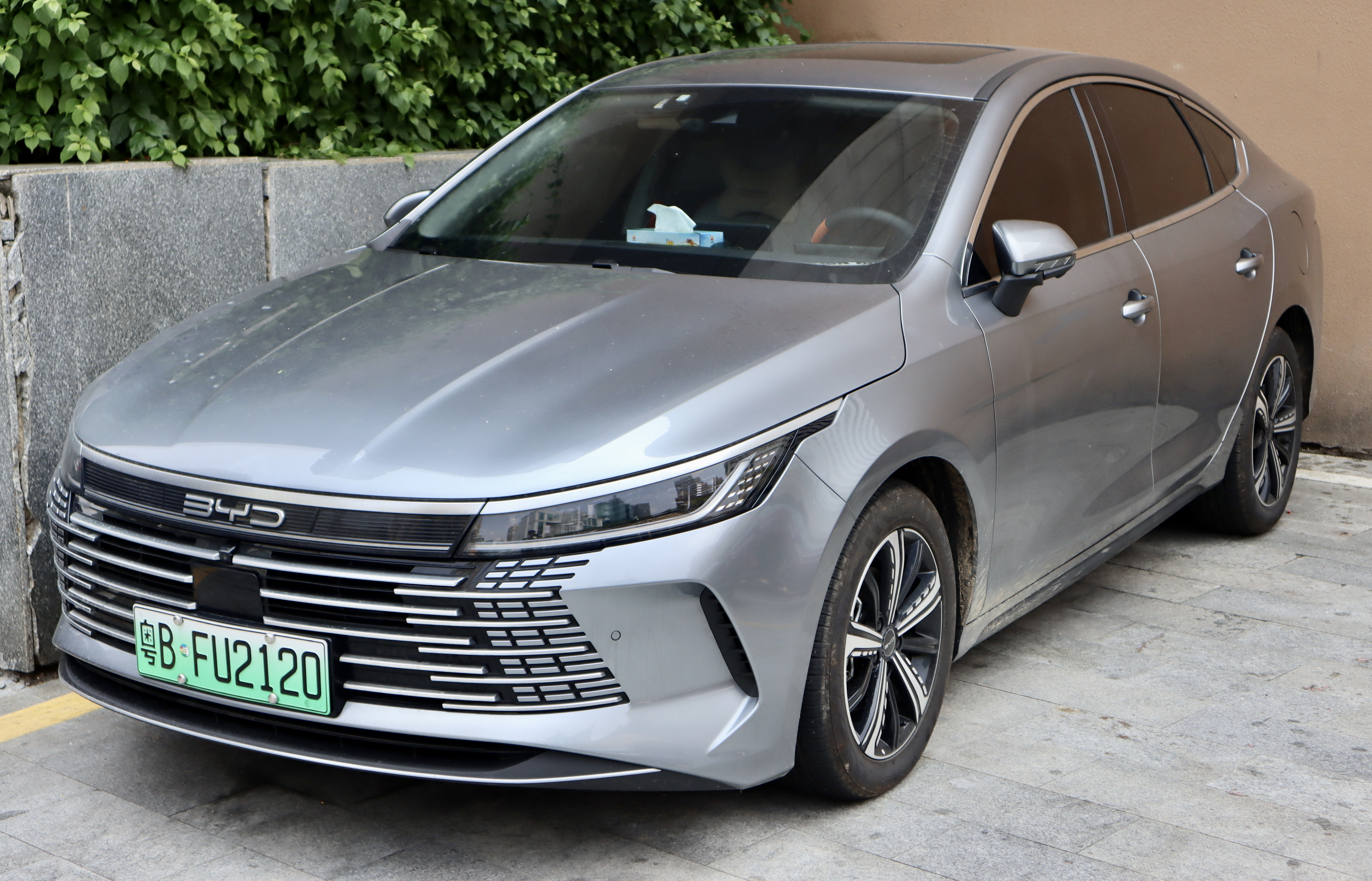

Overview
- Manufacturer: BYD Auto
- Also called: BYD Chazor (Uzbekistan); BYD King (Latin America); BYD Seal 5 DM-i (Southeast Asia, Argentina)
- Production: March 2022–2025 (China); 2023–present (export)
- Assembly: China: Changsha, Hunan; Hefei, Anhui; Uzbekistan: Jizzakh (UzAuto Motors, 2024–present); Thailand: Rayong (BYD Auto (Thailand), 2025–present); Brazil: Camaçari, Bahia
- Designer: Under the lead of Wolfgang Egger; Yuanzheng Pan (exterior)

Body and chassis
- Class: Compact car (C-segment)
- Body style: 4-door sedan
- Layout: Front-engine, front-wheel-drive
- Platform: DM-i 4.0 platform
- Related: BYD Seal 05 DM-i; BYD Qin Pro/Plus

Powertrain
- Engine: Petrol plug-in hybrid: 1.5 L BYD472QA I4; 1.5 L BYD472QC I4
- Electric motor: Permanent magnet synchronous
- Power output: 160 kW (215 hp) (Combined)
- Transmission: E-CVT
- Hybrid drivetrain: Plug-in hybrid
- Battery: 7.7 kWh BYD Blade LFP (Mexico; facelift, Argentina); 8.3 kWh BYD Blade LFP; 13.08 kWh BYD Blade LFP (Thailand); 18.3 kWh BYD Blade LFP; 24.5 kWh BYD Blade LFP (Mexico; facelift)
- Electric range: 55–120 km (34–75 mi)
- Plug-in charging: 25 kW (DC)

Dimensions
- Wheelbase: 2,718 mm (107.0 in)
- Length: 4,780 mm (188.2 in)
- Width: 1,837 mm (72.3 in)
- Height: 1,495 mm (58.9 in)

Chronology
- Successor: BYD Seal 05 DM-i (China)

The BYD Destroyer 05 (Chinese: 比亚迪驱逐舰05; pinyin: Bǐyǎdí Qūzhújiàn 05), sometimes translated in English sources as the BYD Chaser 05, is a compact sedan manufactured by Chinese automaker BYD Auto. Named after the destroyer type of warships, it is the first plug-in hybrid electric vehicle (PHEV) under the "Ocean Series", equipped with the DM-i 4.0 hybrid technology.

The vehicle is marketed in Uzbekistan as the BYD Chazor, in Latin America markets as the BYD King, and in the Southeast Asian markets as the BYD Seal 5 DM-i.

== Overview ==
Unveiled in November 2021 during the Guangzhou Auto Show, the BYD Destroyer 05 went on sale the Chinese car market in March 2022. It is the first vehicle of the Warship Series, which are distributed through the BYD Ocean Network dealerships. It is heavily based on the BYD Qin Plus and Qin Pro compact sedans, which are part of the Dynasty Series, the Destroyer 05 uses the same body as the both sister model Qin Pro and Qin Plus which are badge-engineered variants. It is sharing exactly the same wheelbase dimensions and height while featuring completely restyled front and rear end designs.

The interior of the Destroyer 05 is equipped with an 8.8-inch instrument panel and a 12.3-inch or 15.6-inch main touch screen. The main touch screen can rotate from landscape to portrait.

The Destroyer 05 also comes with the DiPilot intelligent driving assistance system that provides users with advanced driving-assisting functions including active braking, maintaining lanes, adaptive cruise control, and pedestrian recognition and protection.

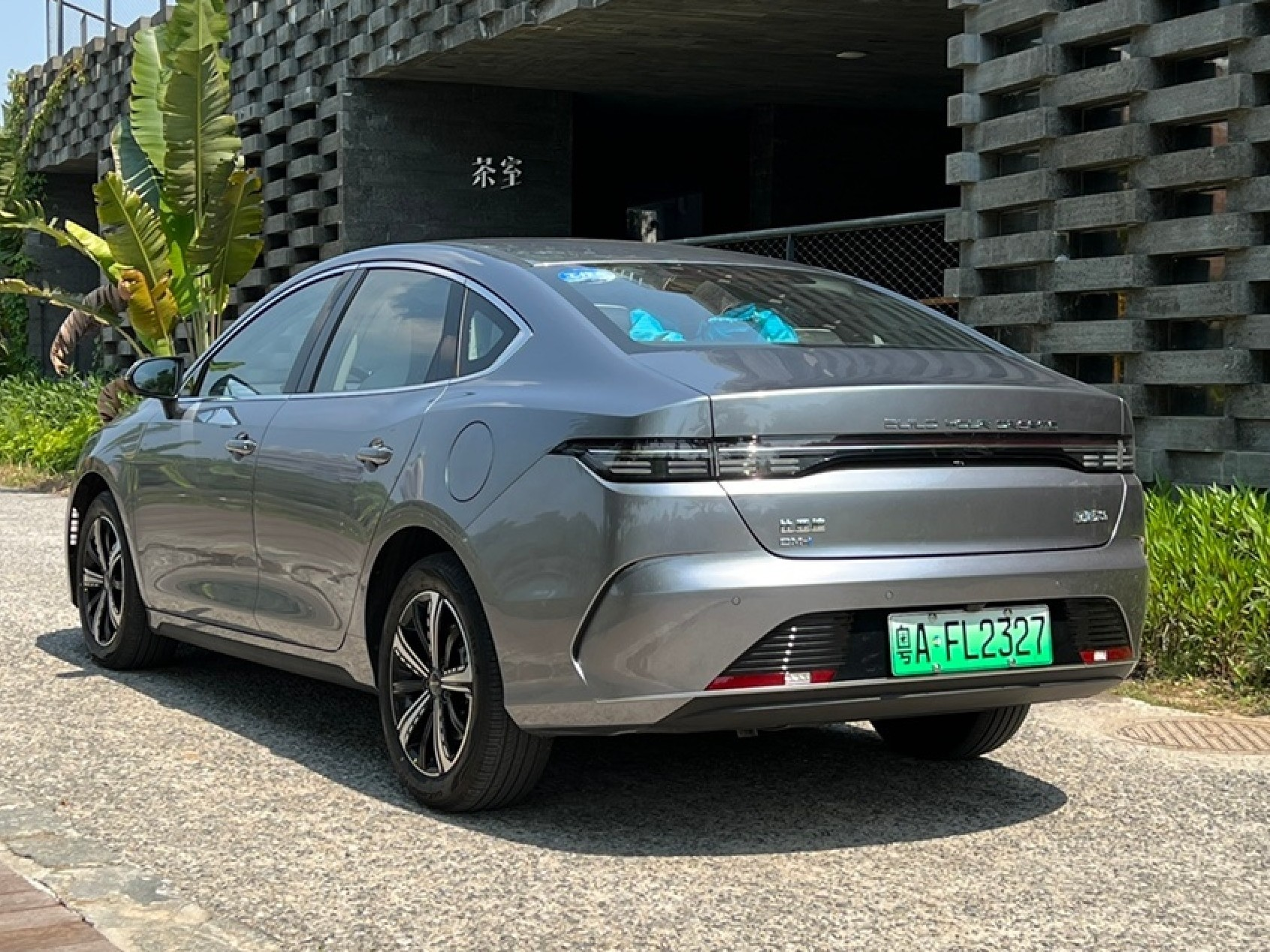
Rear view

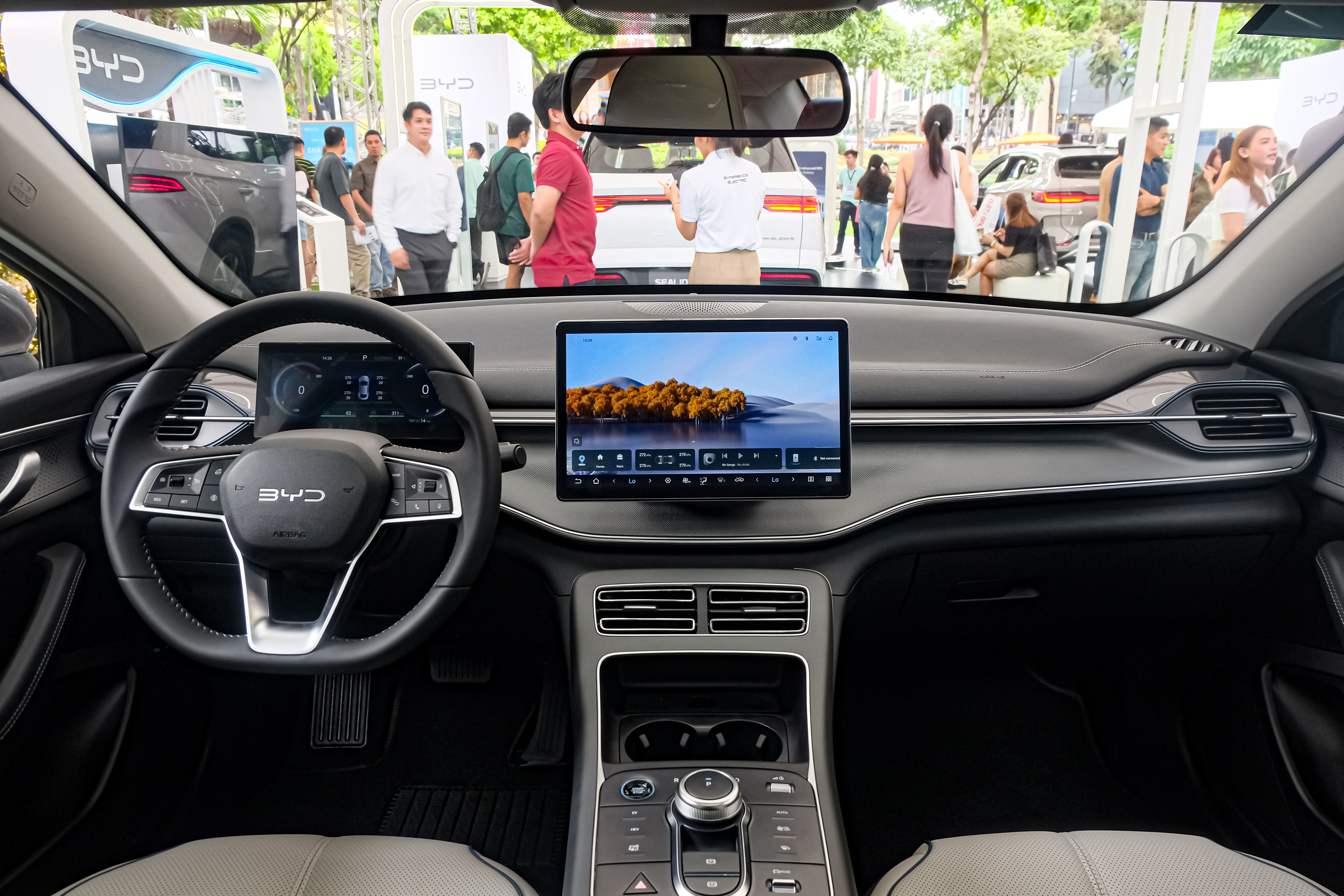
Interior

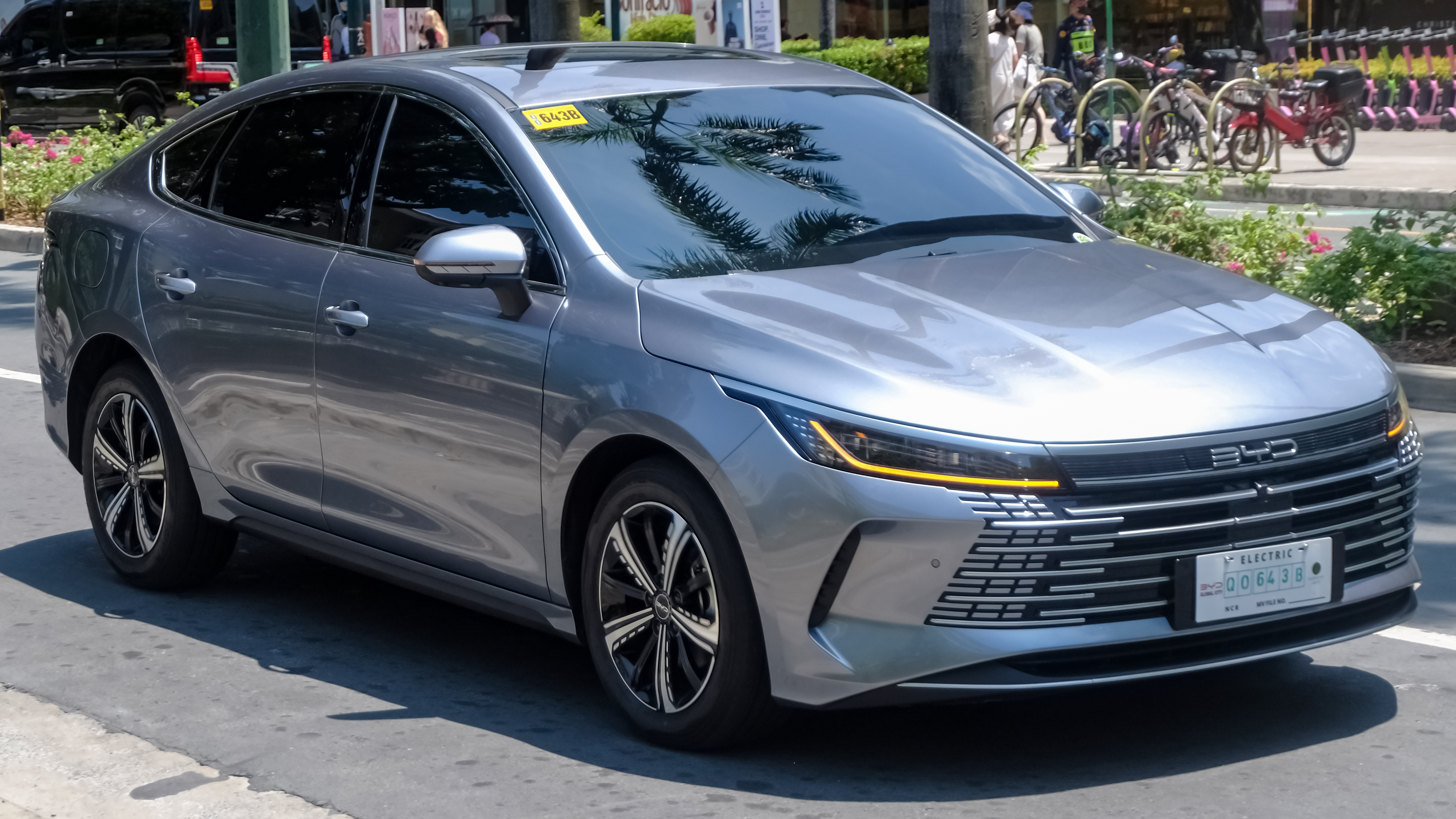
BYD Seal 5 DM-i in the Philippines

== Powertrain ==
The BYD Destroyer 05 is powered by BYD's DM-i hybrid EHS system in two variants with two battery sizes. Both versions are fitted with a 1.5-litre petrol engine producing 81 kW (109 hp; 110 PS) and come with either one or two electric motors based on trim levels for a combined output of 132 kW (177 hp; 179 PS) or 145 kW (194 hp; 197 PS) respectively. The smallest battery is offering a pure electric range of 55 kilometres (34 mi) while the larger one allows it to travel up to 120 kilometres (75 mi) on electric battery power alone. It has a claimed fuel consumption of 3.8 litres per 100 kilometres (74 mpg_{‑imp}; 62 mpg_{‑US}) and a combined range of over 1,200 kilometres (750 mi) on a full tank of fuel and full battery charge.

The 120 km (75 mi) pure electric range version of the Destroyer 05 supports 25 kW fast charging and charging from 30 percent to 80 percent takes 25 minutes.

Type	Engine			Trans.	Battery	Layout	Electric motor			Combined Power	Combined Torque	0–100 km/h (0–62 mph) (claimed)	Electric range (claimed)			Calendar years
Type	Displ.	Power	Torque	Trans.	Battery	Layout	Type	Power	Torque	Combined Power	Combined Torque	0–100 km/h (0–62 mph) (claimed)	CLTC	NEDC	WLTC	Calendar years
1.5 L 55 km DM-i	BYD472QA 1,498 cc (1.5 L) I4	81 kW (109 hp)	135 N⋅m (13.8 kg⋅m; 99.6 lb⋅ft)	E-CVT	8.3 kWh LFP Blade	FWD	PMSM	132 kW (177 hp)	316 N⋅m (32.2 kg⋅m; 233 lb⋅ft)			7.9 seconds	55 km (34 mi)	N/A	46 km (29 mi)	2022–present
1.5 L 120 km DM-i	BYD472QA 1,498 cc (1.5 L) I4	81 kW (109 hp)	135 N⋅m (13.8 kg⋅m; 99.6 lb⋅ft)	E-CVT	18.3 kWh LFP Blade	FWD	PMSM	145 kW (194 hp)	325 N⋅m (33.1 kg⋅m; 240 lb⋅ft)			7.3 seconds	120 km (75 mi)	115 km (71 mi)	101 km (63 mi)	2022–present
1.5 L 50 km DM-i	BYD472QC 1,498 cc (1.5 L) I4	72 kW (97 hp)	122 N⋅m (12.4 kg⋅m; 90.0 lb⋅ft)	E-CVT	7.7 kWh LFP Blade	FWD	PMSM	145 kW (194 hp)	325 N⋅m (33.1 kg⋅m; 240 lb⋅ft)	160 kW (215 hp)	300 N⋅m (30.6 kg⋅m; 221 lb⋅ft)	7.5 seconds	N/A	50 km (31 mi)	N/A	2026–present (Mexico & Argentina)
1.5 L 80 km DM-i	BYD472QC 1,498 cc (1.5 L) I4	72 kW (97 hp)	122 N⋅m (12.4 kg⋅m; 90.0 lb⋅ft)	E-CVT	13.08 kWh LFP Blade	FWD	PMSM	145 kW (194 hp)	325 N⋅m (33.1 kg⋅m; 240 lb⋅ft)	160 kW (215 hp)	300 N⋅m (30.6 kg⋅m; 221 lb⋅ft)	7.5 seconds	N/A	80 km (50 mi)	N/A	2026–present (Thailand)
1.5 L 120 km DM-i (Thailand)	BYD472QC 1,498 cc (1.5 L) I4	72 kW (97 hp)	122 N⋅m (12.4 kg⋅m; 90.0 lb⋅ft)	E-CVT	18.3 kWh LFP Blade	FWD	PMSM	145 kW (194 hp)	325 N⋅m (33.1 kg⋅m; 240 lb⋅ft)	160 kW (215 hp)	300 N⋅m (30.6 kg⋅m; 221 lb⋅ft)	7.5 seconds	N/A	120 km (75 mi)	N/A	2025–present (Thailand)
1.5 L 170 km DM-i (Mexico)	BYD472QC 1,498 cc (1.5 L) I4	72 kW (97 hp)	122 N⋅m (12.4 kg⋅m; 90.0 lb⋅ft)	E-CVT	24.5 kWh LFP Blade	FWD	PMSM	145 kW (194 hp)	325 N⋅m (33.1 kg⋅m; 240 lb⋅ft)	160 kW (215 hp)	300 N⋅m (30.6 kg⋅m; 221 lb⋅ft)	7.5 seconds	N/A	170 km (106 mi)	N/A	2026–present (Mexico)

== Markets ==
=== Latin America ===
==== Argentina ====
The vehicle is marketed in Argentina as the Seal 5 DM-i and was launched on 3 September 2026. It is available in the sole unnamed variant using the 7.7 kWh battery pack.

==== Brazil ====
The vehicle is marketed in Brazil as the King DM-i and was launched on 18 June 2024. It is available with two variants: GL (8.3 kWh) and GS (18.3 kWh).

==== Mexico ====
The vehicle is marketed in Mexico as the King DM-i and was launched on 17 April 2024. It is available in the sole variant using the 8.3 kWh battery pack.

The facelifted model was launched in Mexico on 17 July 2026, with two variants: GL (7.7 kWh; useable 7.42 kWh) and (24.5 kWh).

=== Southeast Asia ===
==== Brunei ====
The vehicle is marketed in Brunei as the Seal 5 DM-i and was launched on 16 October 2025. It is available in the sole Dynamic variant with the 18.3 kWh battery pack.

==== Philippines ====
The vehicle is marketed in the Philippines as the Seal 5 DM-i and was launched on 21 November 2024. It is available with two variants: Dynamic (8.3 kWh) and Premium (18.3 kWh).

==== Thailand ====
The vehicle is marketed in Thailand as the Seal 5 DM-i and was launched on 8 August 2025. It is available with two variants: Standard (13 kWh) and Premium (18.3 kWh). In February 2026, the Standard and Dynamic (13 kWh) variant was added to the line-up.

==== Vietnam ====
The vehicle is marketed in Vietnam as the Seal 5 DM-i and was launched on 17 October 2025. It is available in the sole variant using the 18.3 kWh battery pack.

=== Uzbekistan ===
The vehicle is marketed in Uzbekistan as the Chazor DM-i and was released in March 2023, as part of BYD's introduction in Uzbekistan. It is available with three variants: 55 km Comfort, 120 km Comfort, and 120 km Flagship.

== Sales ==
Year	China	Brazil	Thailand
2022	61,949	—N/a	—N/a
2023	85,806	—N/a	—N/a
2024	217,232	4,823	—N/a
2025	70,618	12,412	650

== See also ==
- List of BYD Auto vehicles
