= BYD Qin L DM-i =

Plug-in hybrid mid-size sedan

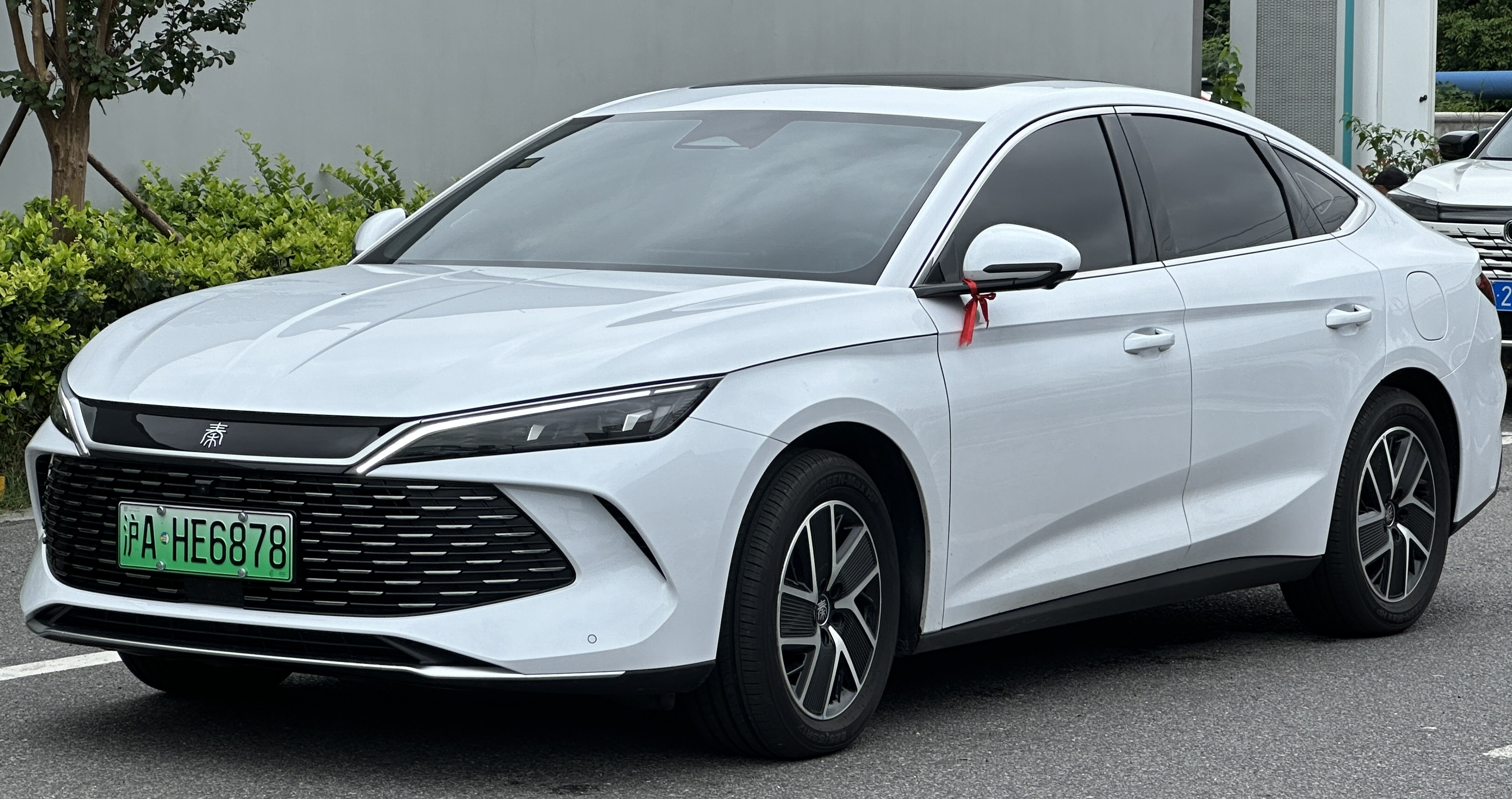

Overview
- Manufacturer: BYD Auto
- Model code: HA3H
- Also called: BYD Seal 6 DM-i (Uzbekistan)
- Production: April 2024 – present
- Model years: 2024–2026 (China)
- Assembly: China: Hefei, Anhui
- Designer: Under the lead of Wolfgang Egger

Body and chassis
- Class: Mid-size car (D-segment)
- Body style: 4-door sedan
- Layout: Front-engine, front-motor, front-wheel drive
- Platform: DM-i 5.0 platform
- Related: BYD Seal 06 DM-i

Powertrain
- Engine: Petrol plug-in hybrid: 1.5 L BYD472QC I4 Atkinson cycle
- Electric motor: Permanent magnet synchronous
- Transmission: E-CVT
- Hybrid drivetrain: Plug-in hybrid
- Battery: 10.08 kWh BYD Blade LFP; 15.87 kWh BYD Blade LFP; 25.28 kWh BYD Blade LFP

Dimensions
- Wheelbase: 2,790 mm (109.8 in)
- Length: 4,830 mm (190.2 in)
- Width: 1,900 mm (74.8 in)
- Height: 1,495 mm (58.9 in)
- Curb weight: 1,660–1,800 kg (3,660–3,968 lb)

The BYD Qin L DM-i (Chinese: 比亚迪秦L DM-i) is a plug-in hybrid mid-size sedan manufactured by BYD Auto since 2024. It is part of BYD's Dynasty Series lineup and has a sister model known as the Seal 06 DM-i. It is positioned between the smaller Qin Plus DM-i and the larger Han DM-i It is part of the BYD Qin series.

== History ==
The Qin L was officially announced just before the Beijing Auto Show in April 2024. Marketed alongside the older and smaller Qin Plus, the Qin L is the largest Qin to date with its length spanning over 4.8 m (189 in) into the mid-size segment. The Qin L DM-i was launched in China on 28 May 2024, with five variants: 80 km Leading, 80 km Transcendence, 120 km Leading, 120 km Transcendence, and 120 km Excellence.

== Design and equipment ==
The Qin L is the first BYD vehicle alongside the similar Seal 06 to use BYD's fifth-generation plug-in hybrid powertrain, which is marketed as DM-i 5.0. BYD claimed a fuel consumption of 2.9 L/100 km (97 mpg_{‑imp}; 81 mpg_{‑US}) and a combined range of over 2,000 km (1,200 mi) on a 65 L (14 imp gal; 17 US gal) tank with a 10 kWh battery.

The exterior of the Qin L DM-i is part of the BYD's Dynasty vehicle series and adopts the series’ Dragon Face design language. The front fascia features illuminated "dragon whiskers" above the headlights, the Qin character on the front underlined by a chrome bar and a large grille. The side features a fastback design and traditional door grab handles. The rear fascia features a full-width LED taillight bar inspired by traditional Chinese knots and an illuminated BYD logo on the rear.

For the suspension, Qin L DM-i uses MacPherson struts at the front and new E-type four-link independent suspensionat the rear.

BYD claimed the interior of the Qin L DM-i is inspired by Chinese landscape paintings and the interior also incorporates various Chinese knot elements. The interior features DiLink intelligent cockpit with a 8.8-inch LCD instrument cluster, rotatable 15.6-inch touchscreen infotainment system, all-scenario intelligent voice control system, in-car ETC and mobile phone NFC key.

For safety, Qin L DM-i is equipped with DiPilot L2 advanced driving assistant system.

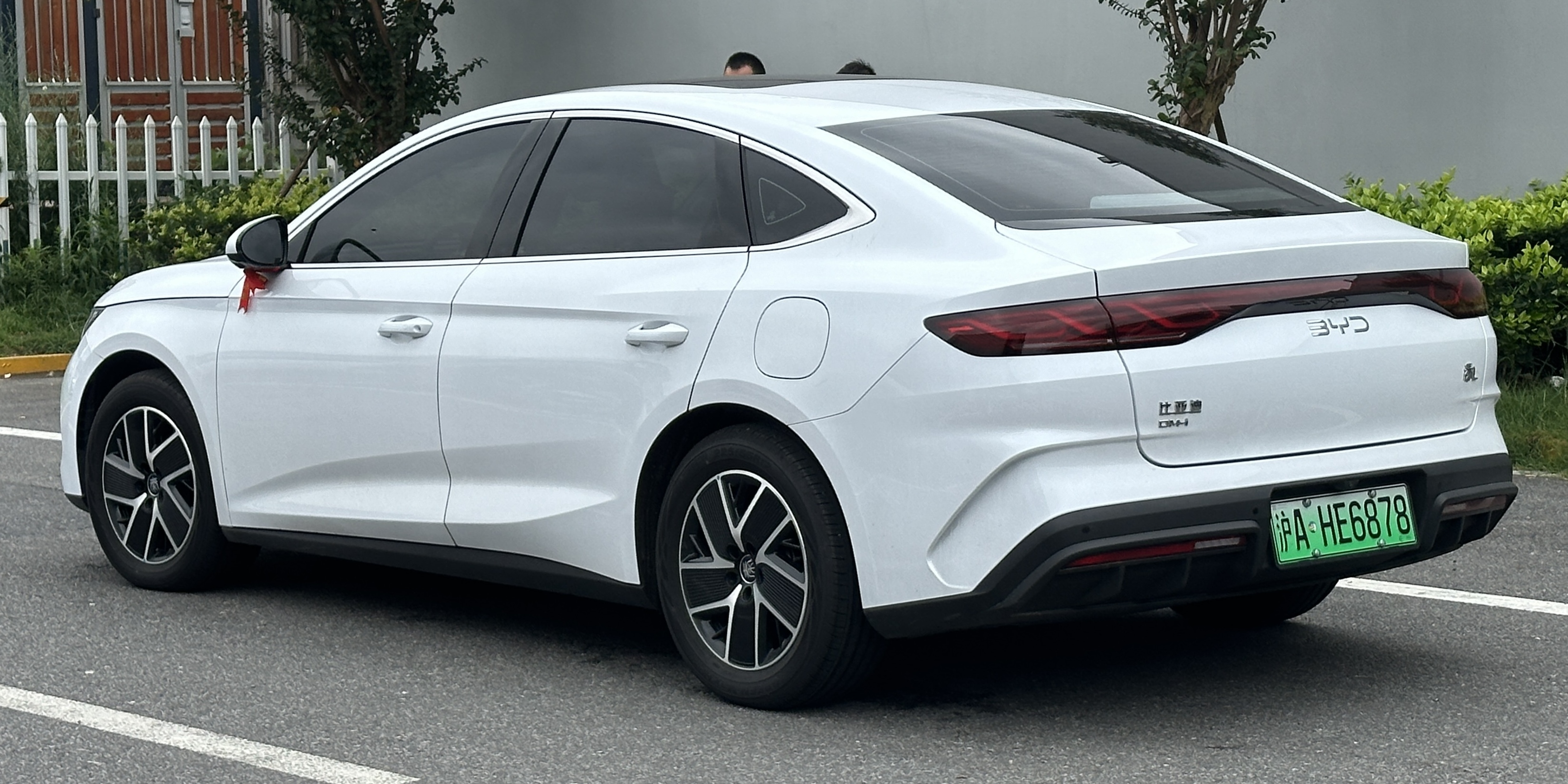
Rear view

== 2026 update ==
In January 2026, the new “Model Year 2026” lineup is introduced, and a new plug‑in hybrid variant debuts at the top of the range. It still uses the 1.5‑liter petrol engine with 101 hp, but it is paired with a new 25.28 kWh battery and an upgraded 175 kW electric motor. Electric‑only range increases to 200–210 km under the Chinese CLTC cycle.

The new 2026 “base” model is equipped with the 15.87 kWh battery (with the same specifications as the previous one and the same 128 km range), while the earlier 10.08 kWh version is discontinued.

== Powertrain ==
Type	Engine			Trans.	Battery	Layout	Electric motor			0–100 km/h (0–62 mph) (claimed)	Electric range (claimed)		Calendar years
Type	Displ.	Power	Torque	Trans.	Battery	Layout	Type	Power	Torque	0–100 km/h (0–62 mph) (claimed)	CLTC	WLTC	Calendar years
1.5L 80 km DM-i	BYD476QC 1,498 cc (1.5 L) I4	74 kW (99 hp)	126 N⋅m (12.8 kg⋅m; 92.9 lb⋅ft)	E-CVT	10.08 kWh LFP Blade battery	FWD	TZ210XYB PMSM	120 kW (161 hp)	210 N⋅m (155 lb⋅ft)	7.9 seconds	80 km (50 mi)	60 km (37 mi)	2024–present
1.5L 120 km DM-i	BYD476QC 1,498 cc (1.5 L) I4	74 kW (99 hp)	126 N⋅m (12.8 kg⋅m; 92.9 lb⋅ft)	E-CVT	15.87 kWh LFP Blade battery	FWD	TZ210XYC PMSM	160 kW (215 hp)	260 N⋅m (192 lb⋅ft)	7.5 seconds	120 km (75 mi)	90 km (56 mi)	2024–present

== Sales ==
Year	China
2024	229,591
2025	192,623
