= Yangwang Altior =

Full-size luxury sedan

Overview
- Manufacturer: BYD Auto
- Model code: HU
- Production: 2027 (to commence)
- Assembly: China
- Designer: Under the lead of Wolfgang Egger

Body and chassis
- Class: Full-size luxury car (F); Ultra-luxury car
- Body style: 4-door sedan
- Platform: e⁴ platform
- Doors: Conventional doors (front); Coach doors (rear)

Dimensions
- Wheelbase: 3,500 mm (137.8 in)
- Length: 5,600 mm (220.5 in)
- Width: 2,030 mm (79.9 in)
- Height: 1,590 mm (62.6 in)

The Yangwang Altior (Chinese: 仰望鼎耀; pinyin: Yǎngwàng Dǐngyào) is an upcoming full-size luxury sedan manufactured by BYD Auto under their flagship Yangwang brand. The Altior is the brand's second sedan after the smaller U7, and is set to be its flagship vehicle.

== History ==
Prior to its release, spy shots of the Altior were obtained while it was still referred to under its codename, HU.

On 27 October 2026, an official teaser and statement was released by Yangwang, showing the model silhouette and partially revealing some design elements. In addition, both its Chinese and English names were revealed.

This is the first Yangwang model to feature a unique word-based name instead of alphanumerical names (e.g. U7), and a unique Chinese and English name. According to Yangwang, the English name "Altior" was taken from Latin and has the definition of "higher", while the Chinese name "鼎耀" expresses the spirit of a "contemporary creator".

Yangwang has officially confirmed that the model will be unveiled in the UAE.

== Overview ==
The Altior was officially unveiled in Abu Dhabi on 7 November 2026.

The front of the Altior features a large front grille with 137 gemstone-cut elements, which also houses the 24-karat gold Yangwang logo. The shape of the headlights are inspired by traditional Chinese bronze vessels, "Ding" (鼎), while the main headlight units feature 12 elements which rotate and light up in sequence. The remainder of the design has been compared to that of several Rolls-Royce models, such as the Ghost. Similar to that model, the Altior features rear-hinged rear doors (coach doors) that can open up to 90 degrees, a dual-tone paint finish with a prominent coachline, 21-inch polished monoblock wheels, as well as umbrella holders integrated into the doors. The coachlines are 4.8 m (190 in) long.

The Altior's interior uses a symmetrical four-seat layout, where the two individual rear seats are separated by a center console. It uses full-grain Nappa leather upholstery, which features Suzhou embroidery with cloud and thunder related motifs in the perforations. Yellow Hetian jade is used for ornaments and detailing in the air vents, while there is also natural wood trim, real metal switches, and pure wool floor mats. Meanwhile, the rear seats feature zero-gravity and mechanical massage functions, and provides up to 354 mm (13.9 in) of knee room and 1,209 mm (47.6 in) of leg room. Additional features include a 39-speaker Dynaudio sound system, a 21.4-inch overhead entertainment display, two refrigerators with up to 5.5 L (340 cu in) in capacity with heating and cooling functions, electric privacy shades, and a motorized storage compartment with champagne flutes. Furthermore, it has a 532 L (18.8 cu ft) trunk.

The Altior is based on BYD's flagship e4 platform, featuring four electric motors that can independently adjust the torque in each wheel up to 100 times per second. Similar to the U8 SUV, it also features a tank turn, emergency tire blowout safety and emergency floatation features, the latter of which allows the car to stay afloat in water for up to 30 minutes and move forward at up to 3 km/h (1.9 mph). It also features a next-generation DiSus fully active suspension system. Yangwang claims that the Altior will have over 1,000 km (620 mi) of pure electric CLTC range.
