= Yangwang U7 =

Full-size luxury sedan

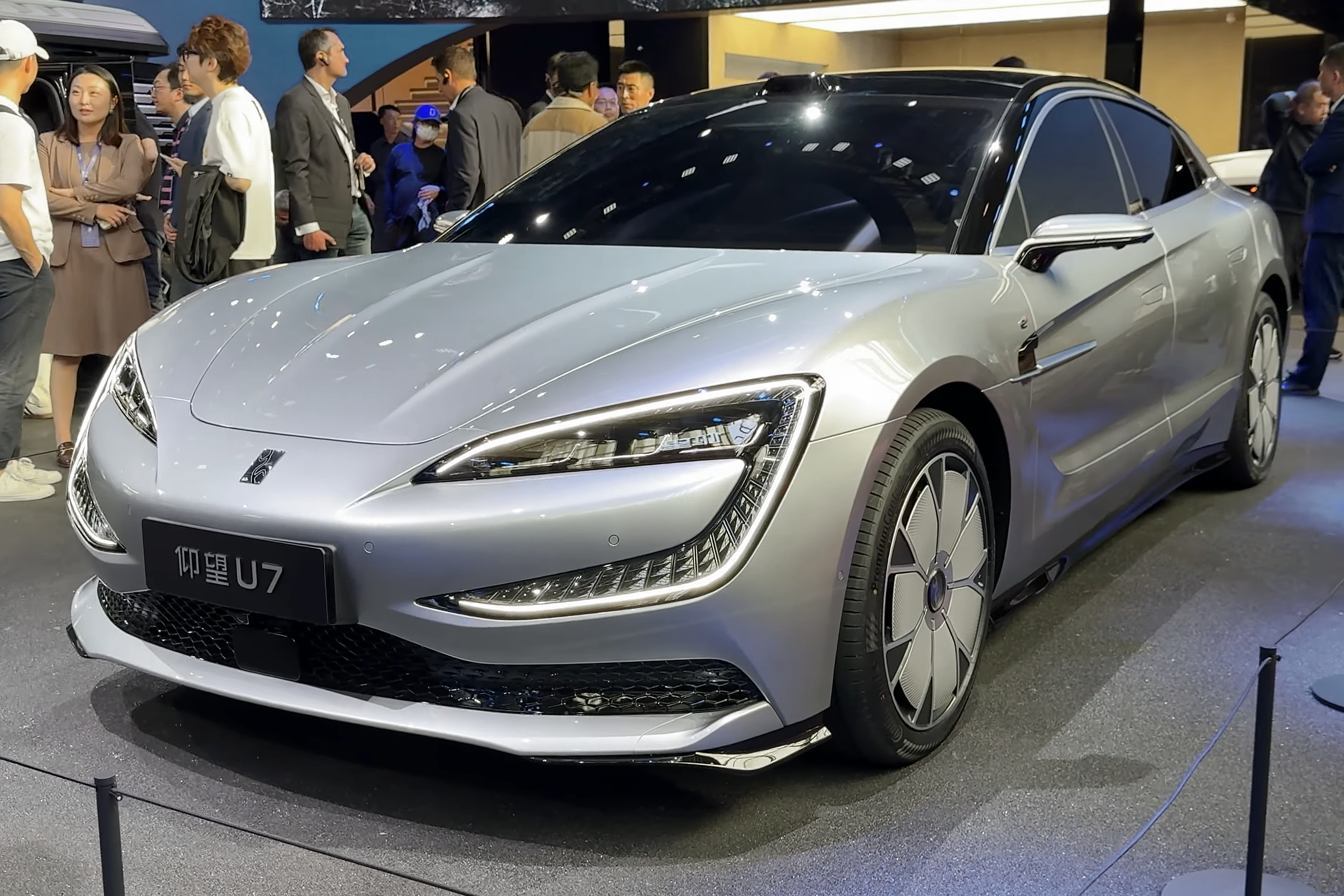

Overview
- Manufacturer: BYD Auto
- Production: May 2025 – present
- Assembly: China: Shenzhen, Guangdong
- Designer: Under the lead of Wolfgang Egger

Body and chassis
- Class: Full-size luxury car (F)
- Body style: 4-door sedan
- Layout: Dual-motor, four-wheel-drive
- Platform: e⁴ platform (YiSiFang)

Powertrain
- Engine: Petrol plug-in hybrid: 2.0 L BYD4H20 F4 turbo
- Electric motor: Permanent magnet motor
- Power output: 960–1,000 kW (1,305–1,360 PS; 1,287–1,341 hp)
- Battery: 52.4 kWh LFP FinDreams; 135.5 kWh LFP FinDreams; 150.0 kWh LFP FinDreams
- Range: 1,000 km (620 mi) CLTC (PHEV)
- Electric range: CLTC: 720–1,006 km (447–625 mi) (EV); 200–220 km (124–137 mi) (PHEV)
- Plug-in charging: 500 kW DC (EV); 230 kW DC (PHEV)

Dimensions
- Wheelbase: 3,160 mm (124 in) (EV); 3,200 mm (130 in) (PHEV)
- Length: 5,265 mm (207.3 in) (EV); 5,360 mm (211 in) (PHEV)
- Width: 1,998 mm (78.7 in) (EV); 2,000 mm (79 in) (PHEV)
- Height: 1,517 mm (59.7 in) (EV); 1,515 mm (59.6 in) (PHEV)
- Curb weight: 3,095 kg (6,823 lb) (EV); 3,223 kg (7,105 lb) (PHEV)

The Yangwang U7 (Chinese: 仰望U7; pinyin: Yǎngwàng U7; lit. 'Looking up towards U7') is a full-size luxury sedan manufactured by BYD Auto under the Yangwang brand. It is available with battery electric and plug-in hybrid powertrain options.

== Overview ==
The Yangwang U7 was officially unveiled as a BEV in January 2024. Pre-sales started in November 2024 at Auto Guangzhou 2024. In January 2025, the PHEV version was leaked through China's MIIT documents. It was shown to be completely re-engineered on a new platform, with different dimensions and a different body. In March 2025, both versions of the Yangwang U7 went on sale in China, with deliveries beginning in June 2025.

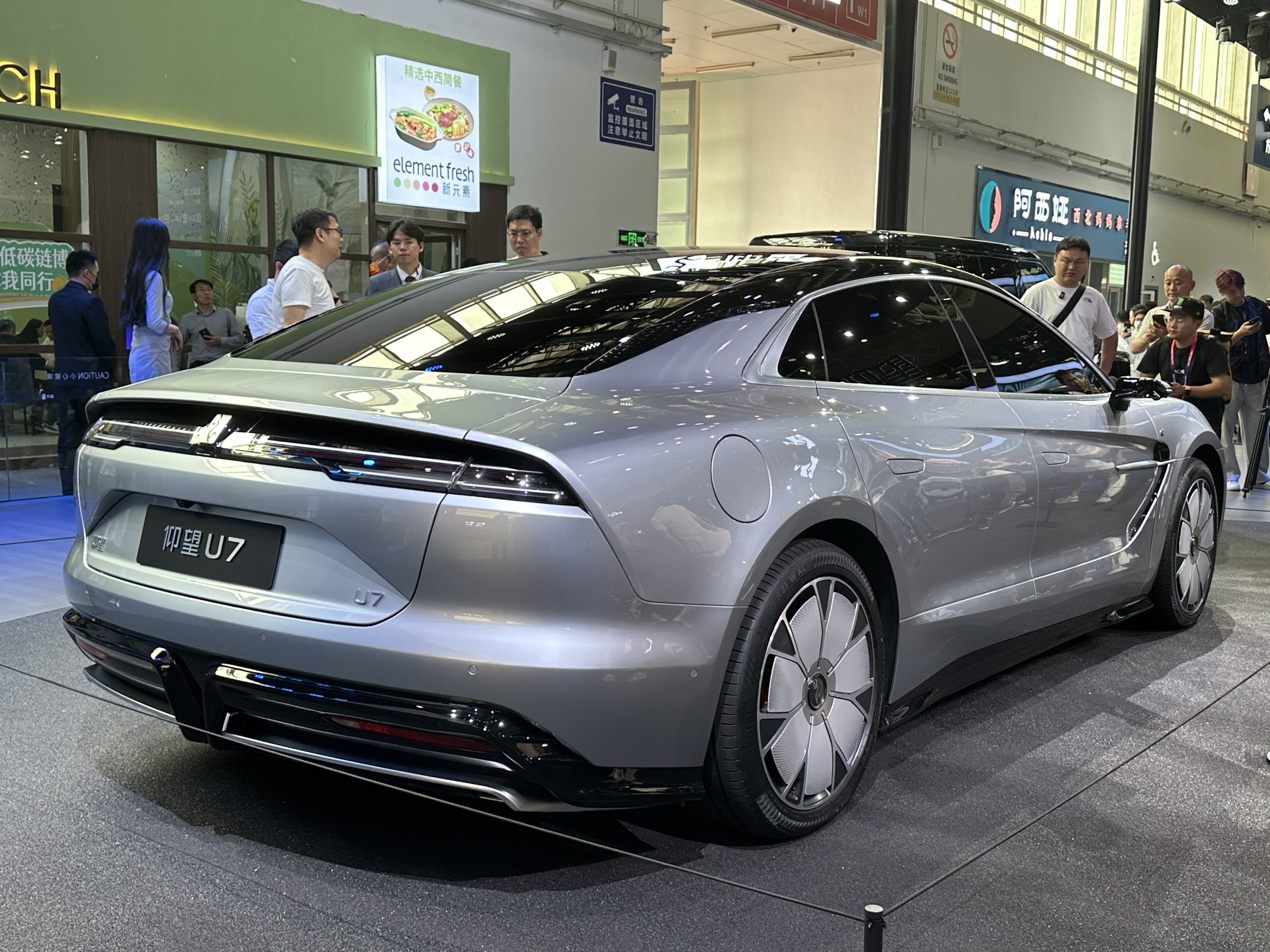
Rear view

=== 2026 update ===
In December 2025, MIIT filings revealed that Yangwang is preparing updates to the U7's powertrain. The EV version will become available with a new 150.01 kWh LFP Blade battery pack capable 860–1,006 km (534–625 mi) of CLTC range, while the existing 135.5 kWh will have its range rating increased to 800 km (497 mi) and PHEV's to 220 km (137 mi). The new battery weighs 926 kilograms (2,041 lb) resulting in an energy density of 162 Wh/kg, compared to the previous battery's 903 kilograms (1,991 lb) and 150 Wh/kg.

== Specifications ==
The U7 is equipped with BYD's e⁴ (易四方) individual wheel drive (IWD) system with four-wheel steering, which consists of four electric motors, each with a maximum power of 321 hp (239 kW; 325 PS) for a total of 1,287 hp (960 kW; 1,305 PS) and 1,680 N⋅m (1,239 lb⋅ft) of torque. It has 20 degrees of rear-wheel steering, allowing for a 4.85-metre (15.9 ft) turning radius.

It is also equipped with BYD's DiSus-Z (云辇-Z) active suspension technology. This system has a response speed of only 10 ms and is also equipped with an energy recovery device that can charge the battery through the 50 kW (67 hp; 68 PS) suspension motor.

It has a drag coefficient of 0.195 C_{d}, and a top speed of 270 km/h (168 mph).

The dashboard features a 23.6-inch digital instrument panel display supplemented by an AR-HUD, a curved 12.8-inch OLED infotainment touchscreen, and a 6-inch passenger information display, all running the DiLink 150 cockpit system on a DiLink 4nm chip. The rear passengers have access to 12.8-inch entertainment displays and control panel display. The front seats have heating, ventilation, and massaging functions along with 20-way power adjustment.

The U7 also comes with BYD's God's Eye, an advanced intelligent driving assistance as part of its DiPilot 700 system, having 3 RoboSense LiDAR units, 5 millimeter-wave radars, 13 cameras, and two Nvidia Orin X SoCs outputting 508 TOPS.

In August 2025 the design for a shooting brake version of the U7 (unofficially known as the U7 GT) was spotted for the first time in the form of a low-camouflaged prototype.

== Powertrain ==
The U7 is available in both a plug-in hybrid and pure electric powertrains. Both versions were initially equipped with the same four-motor individual wheel drive system consisting of permanent magnet synchronous motors each outputting 322 hp (240 kW; 326 PS) and 420 N⋅m (310 lb⋅ft) of torque, for a total of 1,287 hp (960 kW; 1,305 PS) and 1,680 N⋅m (1,239 lb⋅ft) of torque. At the 2025 Guangzhou Auto Show, the U7's rear motors were upgraded with 348 hp (260 kW; 353 PS) units for a total of 1,341 hp (1,000 kW; 1,360 PS).

The U7 EV is equipped with BYD's LFP blade battery with a capacity of 135.5 kWh which is capable of charging from 30–80% in 20 minutes at a peak rate of 500 kW made possible with the use of dual charging ports, and its CLTC pure electric range is 720 kilometres (447 mi). Due to its large capacity and LFP cell chemistry, the battery pack weighs 903 kilograms (1,991 lb), contributing to the Y7's 3,095 kilograms (6,823 lb) curb weight.

The U7 PHEV is equipped with BYD's self-developed 2.0-liter turbocharged flat-four engine, which debuts in the U7 as the company's first flat engine. The engine configuration was chosen for its lower height of 420 mm (17 in) compared to around 700 mm (28 in) for a conventional inline engine, which was needed to package the engine underneath the low hood while also accommodating the front drive motors underneath. Additional benefits include a lower center of gravity and reduced NVH compared to a conventional inline engine. To help reduce its height, the engine is equipped with a dry sump oiling system. The engine outputs 272 hp (203 kW; 276 PS) and 380 N⋅m (280 lb⋅ft) of torque. It is equipped with a 52.4 kWh LFP Blade battery which is capable of charging from 30–80% in 10 minutes at a peak rate of 230 kW. It can accelerate from 0 to 100 km/h (62 mph) in 2.9 seconds, or 4.1 seconds when the battery is low. It has a comprehensive range of 1,000 kilometres (620 mi) with a 60 L (15.9 U.S. gal) fuel tank, and a CLTC pure electric range of 200 kilometres (124 mi). It has a curb weight of 3,223 kilograms (7,105 lb).

| Variant | Year | Battery | | Power | | | Torque | Range (CLTC) | | DC fast charging | | 0–100 km/h (62 mph) | Top speed | Kerb weight |
| Variant | Year | Type | Weight | Front | Rear | Total | Torque | Electric | Total | Peak rate | 30–80% time | 0–100 km/h (62 mph) | Top speed | Kerb weight |
|---|---|---|---|---|---|---|---|---|---|---|---|---|---|---|
| PHEV | 2025 | 52.4 kWh BYD Blade LFP | 446 kg (983 lb) | 480 kW (644 hp; 653 PS) | 520 kW (697 hp; 707 PS) | 1,000 kW (1,341 hp; 1,360 PS) | 1,680 N⋅m (1,239 lb⋅ft) | 200 km (124 mi) | 1,000 km (621 mi) | 230 kW | 10 min | 2.9 | 270 km/h (168 mph) | 3,223 kg (7,105 lb) |
| EV | 2025 | 135.5 kWh BYD Blade LFP | 903 kg (1,991 lb) | 480 kW (644 hp; 653 PS) | | 960 kW (1,287 hp; 1,305 PS) | 1,680 N⋅m (1,239 lb⋅ft) | 720 km (447 mi) | | 500 kW | 20 min | 2.9 | 270 km/h (168 mph) | 3,095 kg (6,823 lb) |
| PHEV | 2026 | 52.4 kWh BYD Blade LFP | 446 kg (983 lb) | 480 kW (644 hp; 653 PS) | 520 kW (697 hp; 707 PS) | 1,000 kW (1,341 hp; 1,360 PS) | 1,680 N⋅m (1,239 lb⋅ft) | 220 km (137 mi) | | 230 kW | 10 min | 2.9 | 270 km/h (168 mph) | 3,079–3,198 kg (6,788–7,050 lb) |
| EV | 2026 | 135.5 kWh BYD Blade LFP | 903 kg (1,991 lb) | 480 kW (644 hp; 653 PS) | | 960 kW (1,287 hp; 1,305 PS) | 1,680 N⋅m (1,239 lb⋅ft) | 800 km (497 mi) | | 500 kW | 20 min | 2.9 | 270 km/h (168 mph) | 3,095 kg (6,823 lb) |
| EV | 2026 | 150.01 kWh BYD Blade LFP | 926 kg (2,041 lb) | 480 kW (644 hp; 653 PS) | | 960 kW (1,287 hp; 1,305 PS) | 1,680 N⋅m (1,239 lb⋅ft) | 860–1,006 km (534–625 mi) | | | | | | 3,120–3,290 kg (6,880–7,250 lb) |

== Sales ==
| Year | China | | |
| Year | EV | PHEV | Total |
|---|---|---|---|
| 2025 | 1,085 | 799 | 1,884 |
