= Uniwheel =

Uniwheel can refer to:

- a monowheel, also known as a uniwheel, a single-wheeled vehicle
- the Uni Wheel, an in-wheel gear train system
