= Yangwang U8 =

Luxury SUV

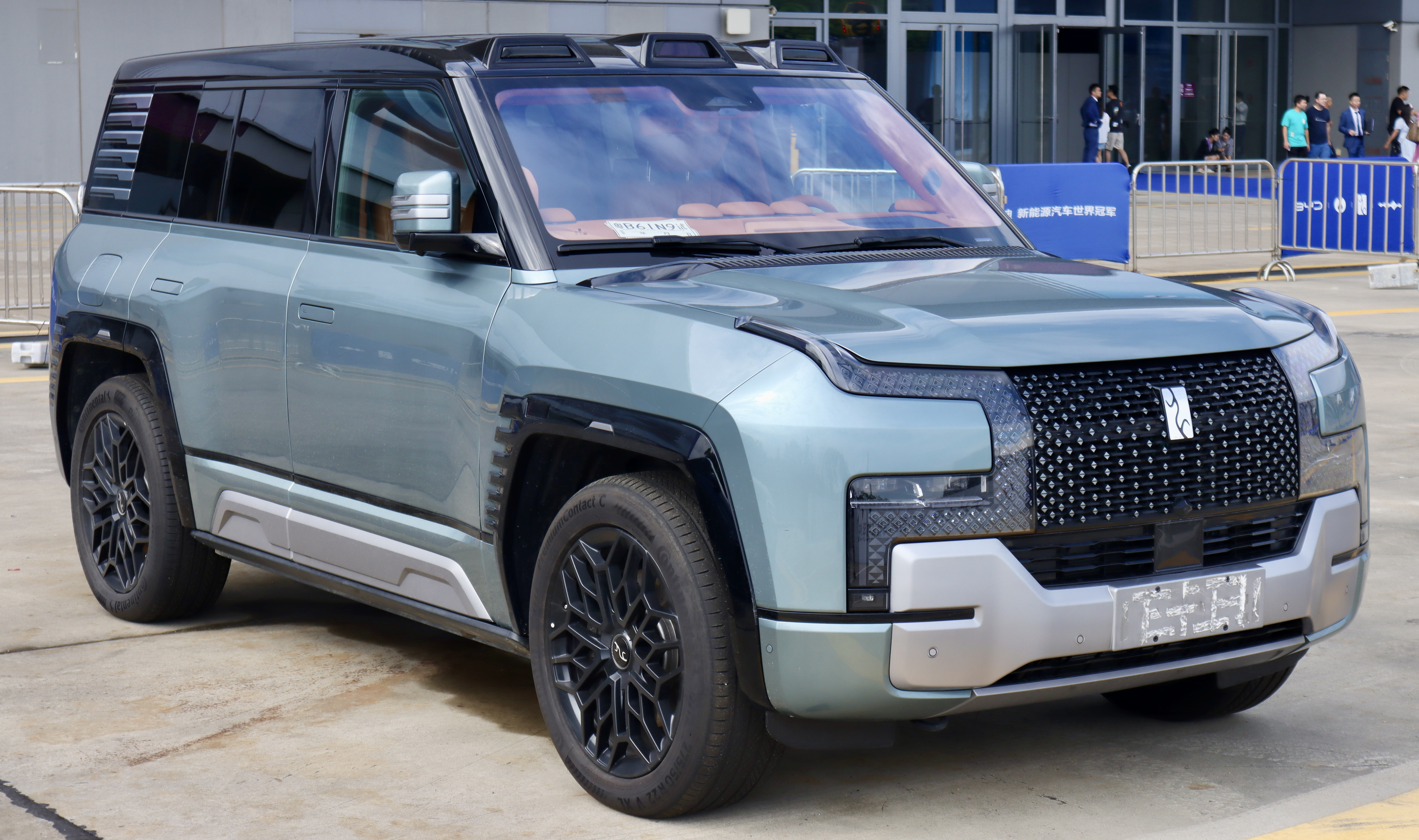

Overview
- Manufacturer: BYD Auto
- Production: April 2023 – present
- Assembly: China: Xi'an, Shaanxi
- Designer: Under the lead of Wolfgang Egger

Body and chassis
- Class: Full-size luxury SUV
- Body style: 5-door SUV
- Layout: Front-engine + quad-motor, individual-wheel-drive
- Platform: e⁴ platform (YiSiFang)
- Chassis: Body-on-frame

Powertrain
- Engine: Petrol range extender: 2.0 L BYD487ZQD I4 turbo
- Electric motor: 880 kW (1,180 hp; 1,196 PS) permanent magnet
- Hybrid drivetrain: Range extender series plug-in hybrid
- Battery: 49.05 kWh LFP
- Range: 1,000 km (620 mi) (CLTC)
- Electric range: 180 km (112 mi) (CLTC)
- Plug-in charging: 110 kW (DC); 7 kW AC

Dimensions
- Wheelbase: 3,050 mm (120.1 in); 3,250 mm (128.0 in) (U8L)
- Length: 5,319 mm (209.4 in); 5,400 mm (212.6 in) (U8L)
- Width: 2,050 mm (80.7 in); 2,049 mm (80.7 in) (U8L)
- Height: 1,930 mm (76.0 in); 1,921 mm (75.6 in) (U8L)
- Kerb weight: 3,460 kg (7,628 lb); 3,595 kg (7,926 lb) (U8L)

The Yangwang U8 (Chinese: 仰望U8; pinyin: Yǎngwàng U8; lit. 'Looking up towards U8') is a full-size luxury SUV manufactured by BYD Auto under the Yangwang brand. The U8 is Yangwang's first vehicle, and was introduced in January 2024. It is an electric vehicle with a petrol engine acting as a range extender.

== Overview ==
The U8 was first presented on 5 January 2023. Sales of the SUV began on 18 April in China. Pricing was announced on 20 September 2023. At 1,098,000 RMB, the U8 Premium Edition was the most expensive Chinese mass-produced electric car at the time of its introduction, until it was surpassed by the U9 supercar in February 2024 at 1,680,000 RMB. The U8 will also be available in an Off-road Master Edition that is equipped with off-road additions, such as a remodelled front bumper, a snorkel and detachable roof rack with a side ladder.

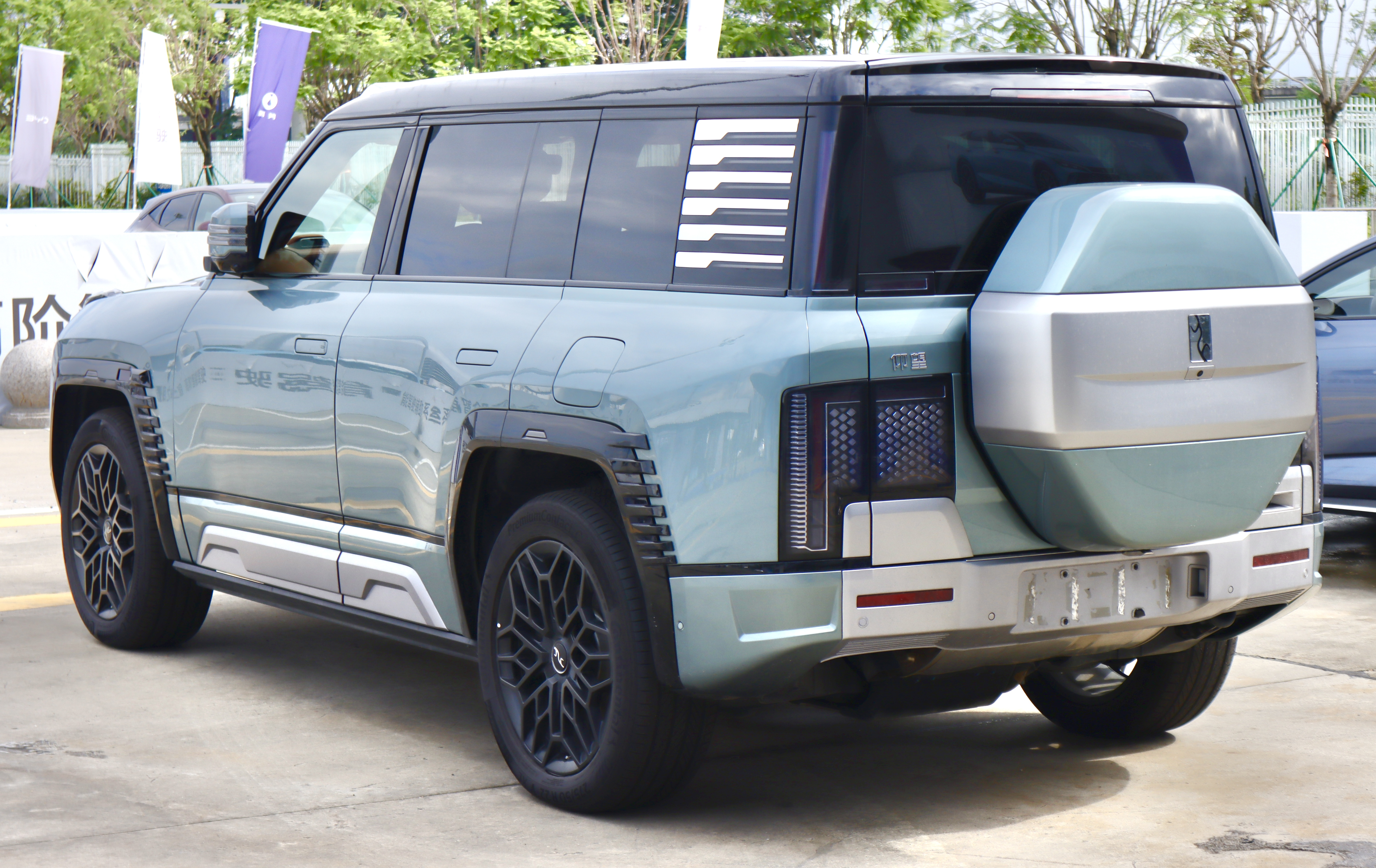
Rear view

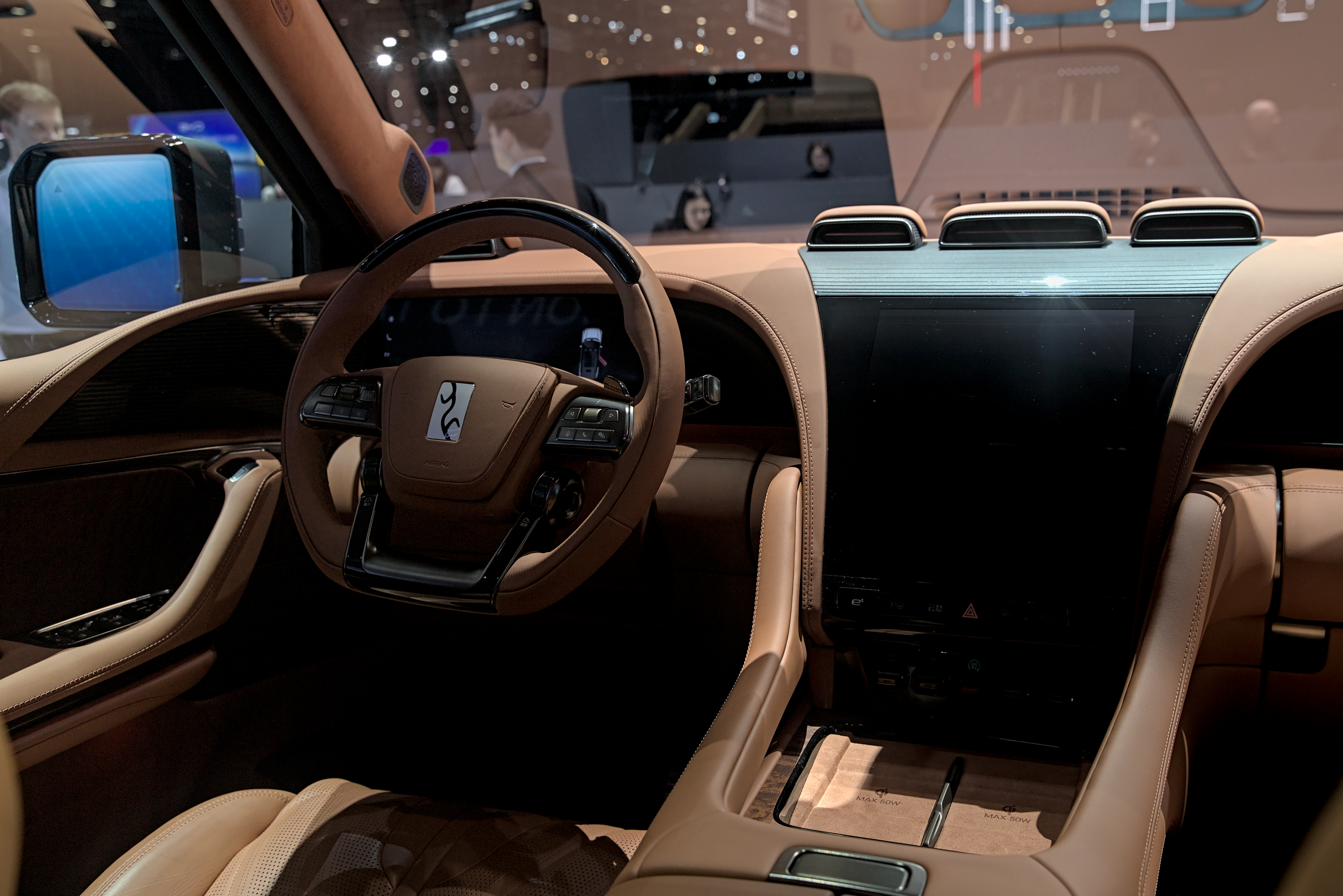
Interior

== Specifications ==
The U8 features BYD's proprietary "e^{4}" (易四方) individual wheel drive (IWD) technology. It is the world's first exclusive intelligent hydraulic body control system for new energy off-road vehicles with four separate electric motors each propelling a single wheel. This technology allows the traction control system to redistribute torque and maintain stability of the vehicle in the case of a tyre puncture at speed. It also allows the U8 to use differential steering and perform an up to 359-degree "tank turn" in tight spots by having the left and right wheels spinning in opposite directions. During the media release event in early 2023, BYD Chairman Wang Chuanfu personally drove a Mecanum-wheeled demo vehicle sideways onto the stage. According to the developers, the new electronically controlled all-wheel drive system is 100 times faster than a conventional all-wheel drive system.

A Yangwang U8 performing a tank turn

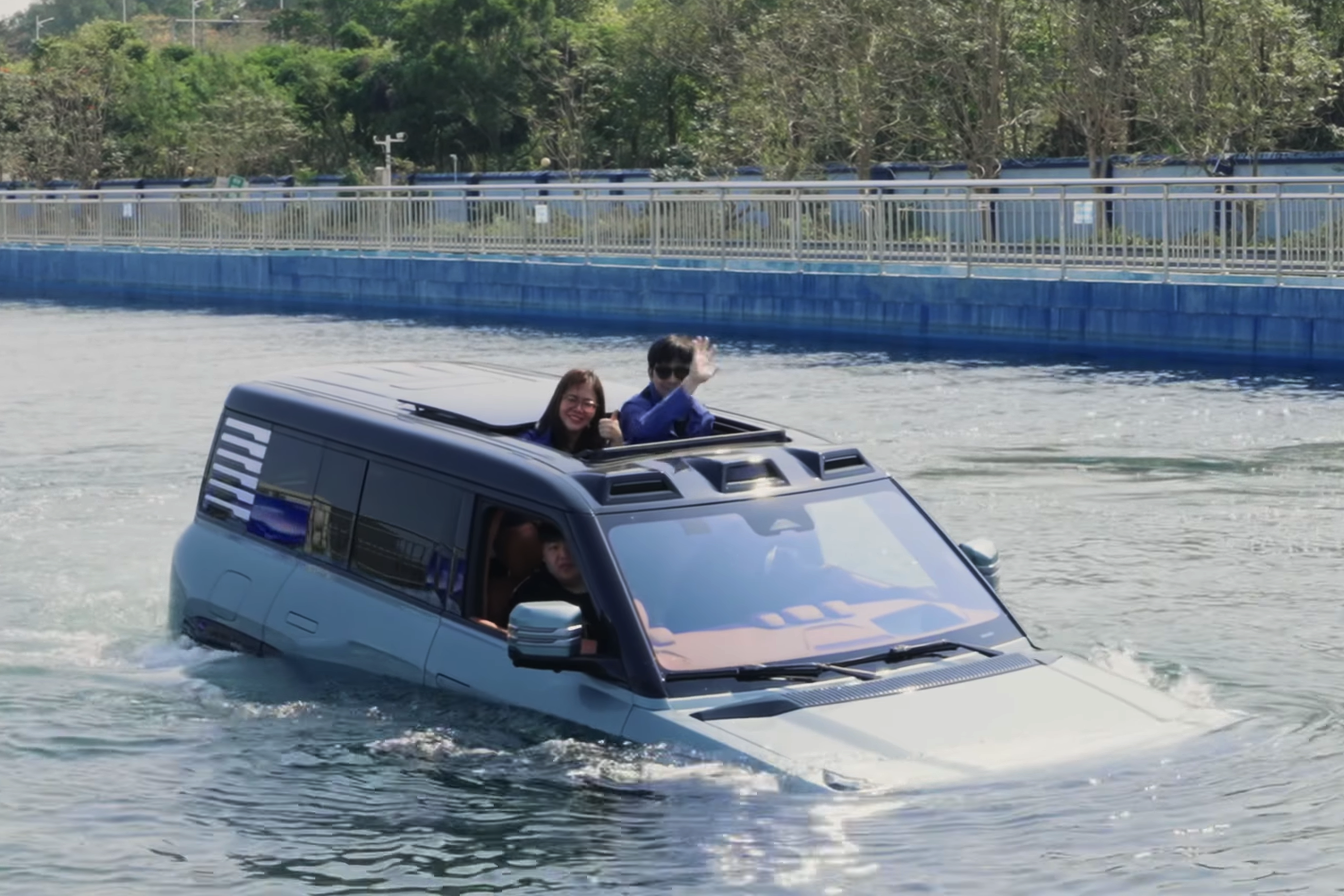

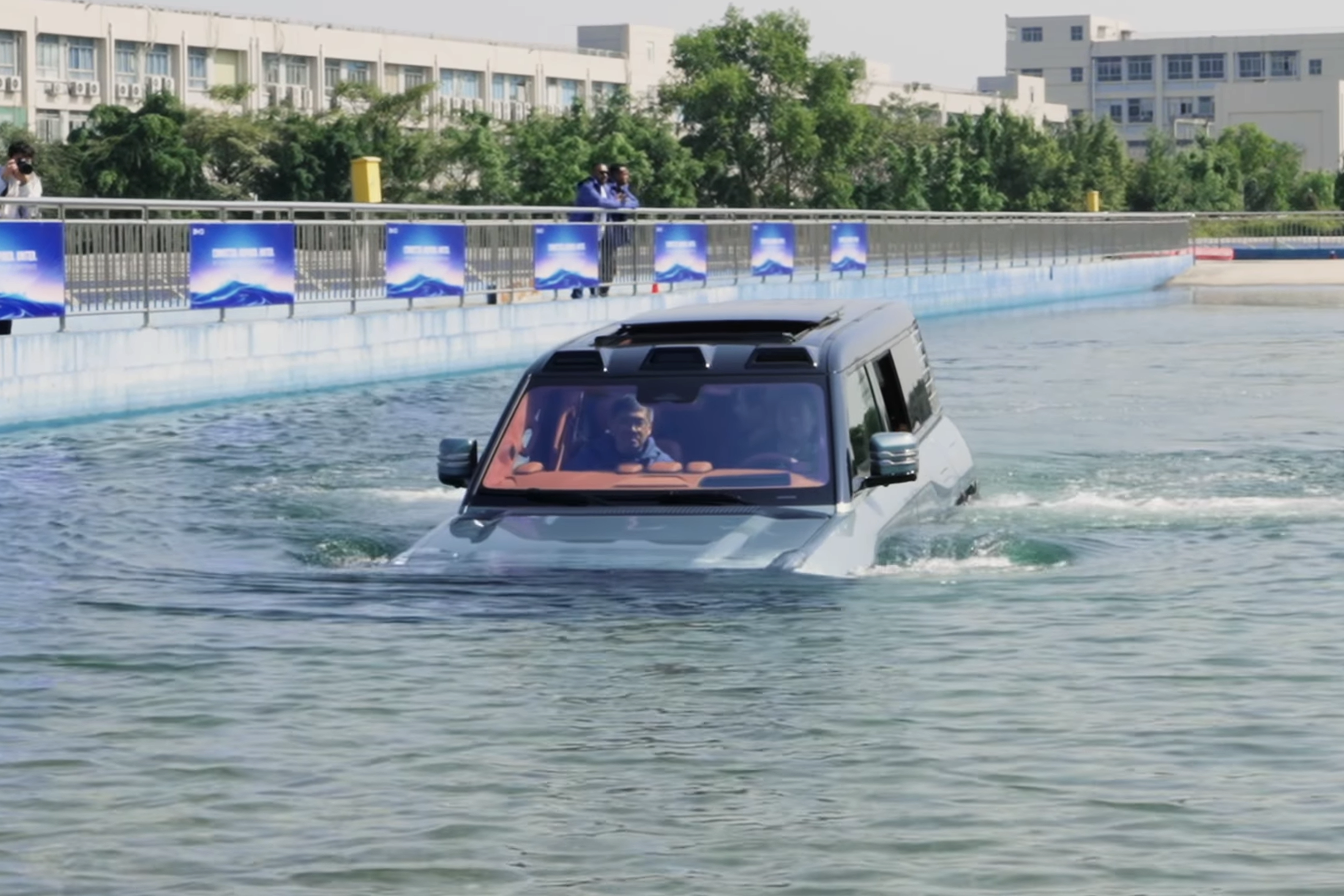
A Yangwang U8 during emergency floating mode

The basic U8 has Disus-P (云辇-P) active suspension with the capacity to increase the ground clearance by 15 cm (5.9 in). Being an off-road vehicle, the U8 Premium Edition is capable of wading in a maximum depth of 1,000 mm (39 in), while the Off-road Master Edition can wade up to 1,400 mm (55 in), being equipped with a snorkel. It also has limited ability to sail on water, although BYD discourages owners to do so as it is only meant as an emergency escape feature for disaster situations like flash floods, and owners must take their vehicle to a service centre for inspection afterwards. When the vehicle detected higher water depth than the wading limit, it will activate an emergency floating mode. In this mode, the vehicle will shut down its petrol engine, the Disus-P system will raise the suspension to the maximum level, the windows will be closed automatically, the air conditioner will be switched to internal circulation mode, and the sunroof will open to provide an emergency exit. It is capable of staying afloat for 30 minutes and move forward at 3 km/h (2 mph). Approach, departure, breakover angles are 36.5°, 35.4° and 25.5° respectively, with a ramp travel index of 600.

The U8's dashboard is embedded with three screens, which include a 23.6-inch instrument panel display for the driver, a vertical 12.8-inch central control infotainment touchscreen, and another 23.6-inch infotainment screen for the front passenger. Two screens are mounted to the back of the front seats for the rear passengers, and another screen is mounted on the console between the rear seats. The driver is supplemented with a 70-inch augmented reality head-up display and 22 Dynaudio-branded speakers. Other in-car technologies include three mobile phone wireless chargers, a thermographic camera and an integrated satellite phone. The center console has built-in compressor fridge, freezer, heater capable of maintaining temperatures between -6 and 50 °C.

The U8 uses the NVIDIA Drive Orin system-on-a-chip (SoC) for its Level 2 advanced driver-assistance system (ADAS), with a computational power of 508 TOPS. Input are supplied from 38 sensors around the vehicle, including 3 lidars, 13 cameras, 12 ultrasonic sonars, and 5 millimeter wave radars.

== Powertrain ==
The U8 is equipped with a 2.0-liter turbo petrol engine that is not mechanically connected to the wheels, thus making it an electric range extended vehicle. It charges a 49.05 kWh battery, that in turn powers four 220 kW (295 hp; 299 PS) traction electric motors for a total output of 880 kW (1,180 hp; 1,196 PS). Its maximum range is listed as 1,000 km (620 mi) with a full 75-litre petrol tank and full battery on the CLTC cycle. Top speed is limited to 200 km/h (124 mph), and 0–100 km/h (0–62 mph) acceleration is claimed at 3.6 seconds.

The U8 supports DC fast charging up to 110 kW, with BYD claiming a 30–80% charging duration in 18 minutes. It is also capable of supplying 6 kW discharge through the vehicle-to-load capability.

Engine (not connected to the wheels)		Battery	Layout	Electric motor				0–100 km/h (0–62 mph) (claimed)	Electric range (claimed)		Calendar years
Displ.	Power	Battery	Layout	Type		Power	Torque	0–100 km/h (0–62 mph) (claimed)	CLTC	WLTP	Calendar years
BYD487ZQD 1,997 cc (2.0 L) I4 turbo	200 kW (268 hp; 272 PS)	49.05 kWh LFP	AWD	Front	PMSM	440 kW (590 hp; 598 PS)	640 N⋅m (65.3 kg⋅m; 472 lb⋅ft)	3.6 seconds	180 km (112 mi)	124 km (77 mi)	2023–present
BYD487ZQD 1,997 cc (2.0 L) I4 turbo	200 kW (268 hp; 272 PS)	49.05 kWh LFP	AWD	Rear	PMSM	440 kW (590 hp; 598 PS)	640 N⋅m (65.3 kg⋅m; 472 lb⋅ft)	3.6 seconds	180 km (112 mi)	124 km (77 mi)	2023–present
BYD487ZQD 1,997 cc (2.0 L) I4 turbo	200 kW (268 hp; 272 PS)	49.05 kWh LFP	AWD	Combined:		880 kW (1,180 hp; 1,196 PS)	1,280 N⋅m (131 kg⋅m; 944 lb⋅ft)	3.6 seconds	180 km (112 mi)	124 km (77 mi)	2023–present

== Yangwang U8L ==
=== Overview ===
The lengthened version of the Yangwang U8 called the U8L was introduced at the 2025 Auto Shanghai in April 2025. The model features three-row seating for six passengers and a 200 mm (7.9 in) longer wheelbase. Although its body length has been increased by 81 mm (3.2 in) in dimension, the standard model's spare tire has been omitted, meaning the actual increase in body length greatly exceeds 81 mm (3.2 in). It was officially launched on 12 September 2025, with a starting price of 1,280,000 RMB.

=== Exterior ===
The U8L features a two-tone “Obsidian Black / Sunstone Gold” paint scheme. The front and rear Yangwang badges are made from 24 karat gold, with the same material optionally applied to the steering wheel emblem. Chrome exterior elements in the front and rear bumpers and the D-pillar have been replaced by black and gold variants. It can be equipped with multiple forged alloy wheel designs distinct from those in the standard U8, including 22-inch multi-spoke and 23-inch eight-hole designs. At the rear, the U8L omits the externally mounted spare tire found on the standard U8 and adopts a power-operated, vertically split tailgate. This omission means that the length increase compared to the standard U8 is a lot more substantial than 81 mm (3.2 in).

=== Interior ===
Compared to the standard U8, the interior features different upholstery colors and trims, including unique wood finishes and lambswool floor mats. The second row features two individual seats each with 18-point massage and a zero-gravity mode. There are only two seats in third-row, though by design the width of the interior was actually capable of accommodating 3 passengers. Instead, a heated central armest was added. Both seats are electronically adjustable and feature seat heating.

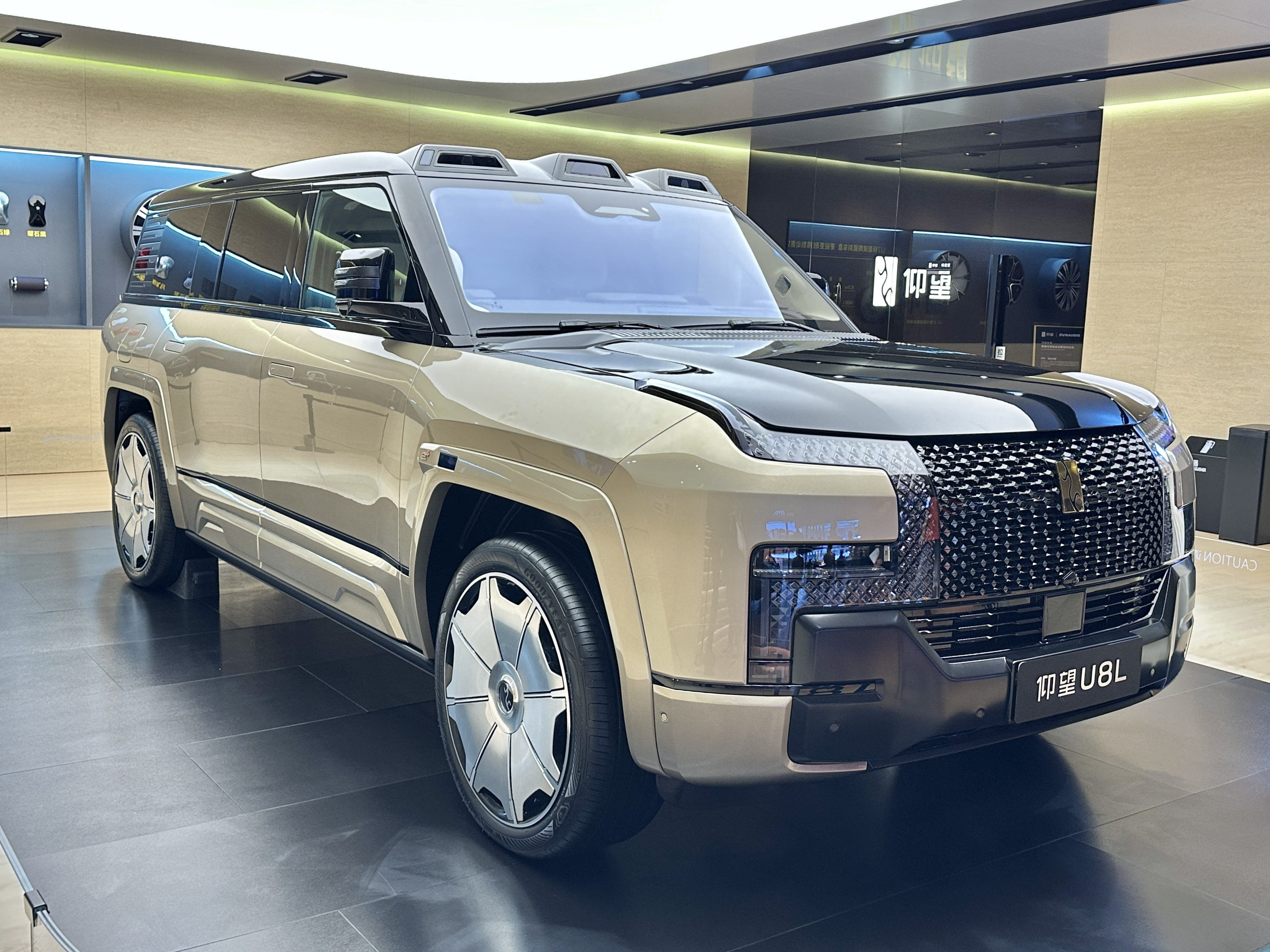
Yangwang U8L

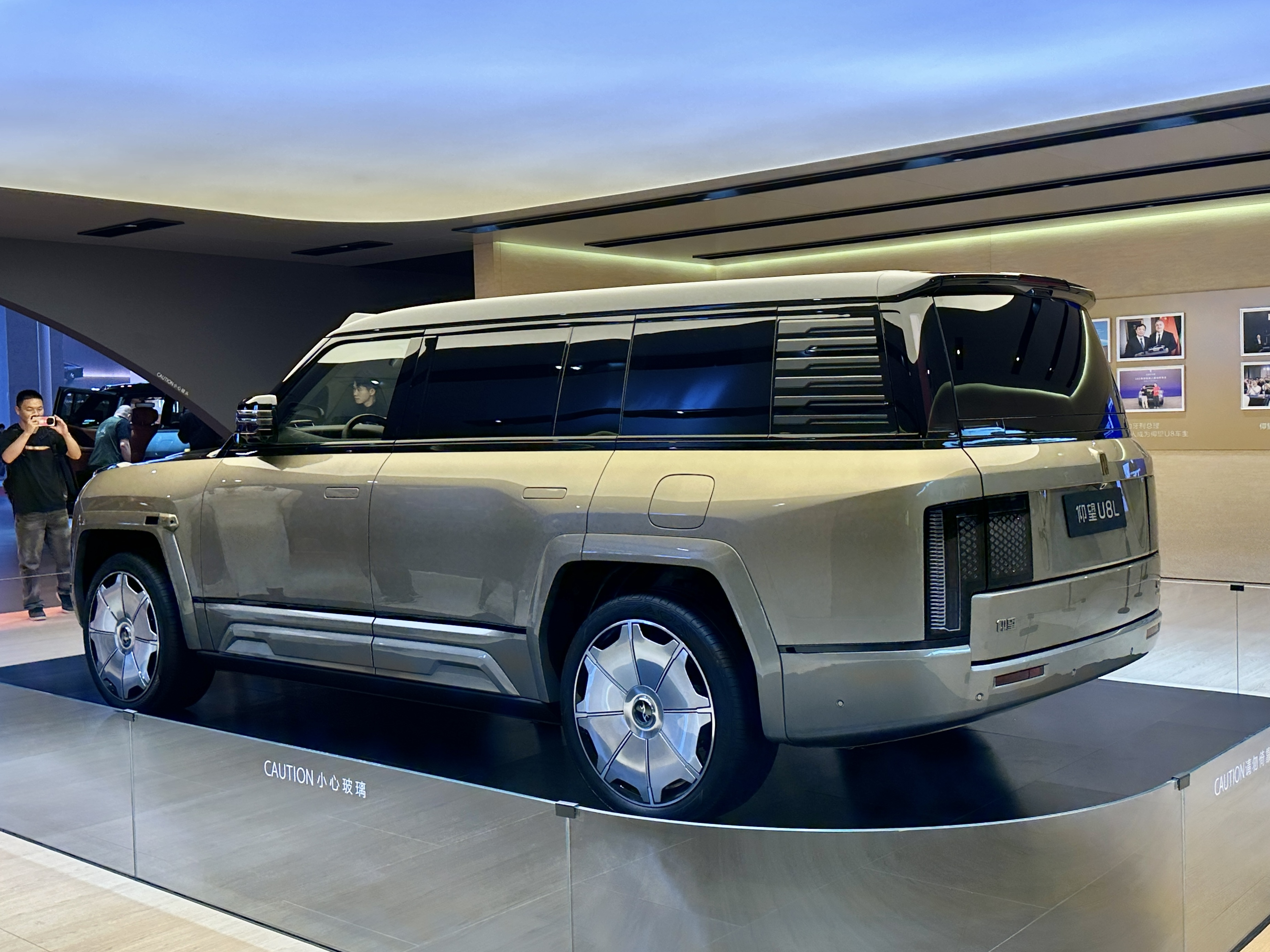
Rear view

== Marketing and sales ==
Since the U8's public debut at the Shanghai Auto Show in April 2023, as of 6 October 2023, U8 has received approximately 4,000 orders in China.

The U8 is slated to be exported by BYD, with BYD Australia confirming the U8 has been locked in for introduction in Australia.

The U8 had its European premiere at the Geneva International Motor Show 2024. However, the availability of the model in European markets has not been confirmed.

The U8 was showcased at the 2025 Seoul Mobility Show in South Korea.

Year	China		
Year	U8	U8L	Total
2023	2,001	—	2,001
2024	7,366	—	7,366
2025	1,054	1,575	2,629
