= Alfa Romeo 8C Competizione =

Alfa Romeo 8C Competizione Alfa Romeo 8C Spider
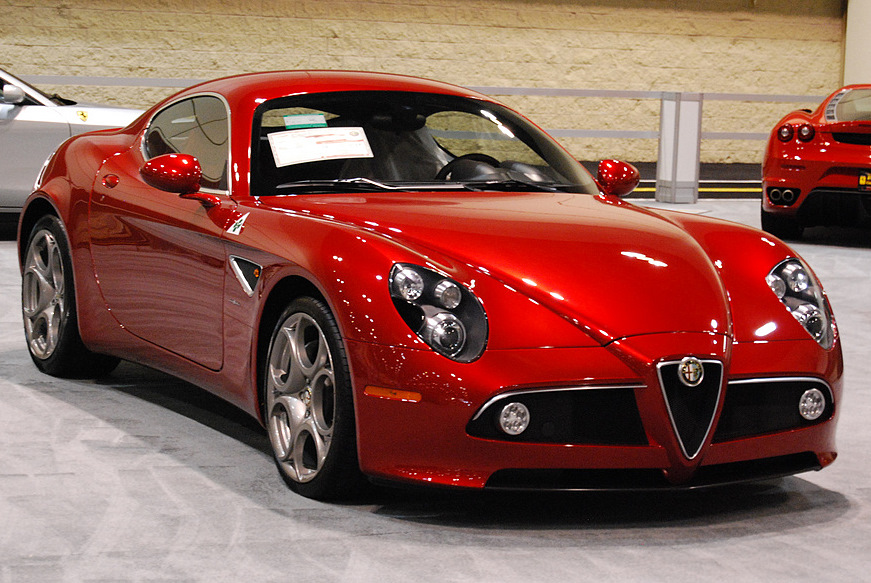

Overview
- Manufacturer: Alfa Romeo
- Production: 2007–2009 (coupé); 2008–2010 (spider); 829 produced
- Assembly: Italy: Modena (Maserati)
- Designer: Wolfgang Egger and Daniele Gaglione at Centro Stile Alfa Romeo

Body and chassis
- Class: Sports car (S)
- Body style: 2-door coupé 2-door spider
- Layout: Front mid-engine, rear-wheel-drive
- Related: Maserati Quattroporte V; Maserati GranTurismo; Maserati GranCabrio; Alfa Romeo BAT 11; Alfa Romeo Pandion; Alfa Romeo Disco Volante by Touring

Powertrain
- Engine: 4.7 L (4,691 cc) Ferrari/Maserati F136 YC DOHC 32v V8
- Power output: 331 kW (450 PS; 444 hp); 480 N⋅m (354 lbf⋅ft) of torque
- Transmission: 6-speed automated manual

Dimensions
- Wheelbase: 2,646 mm (104.2 in)
- Length: 4,381 mm (172.5 in)
- Width: 1,894 mm (74.6 in)
- Height: 1,341 mm (52.8 in) (coupé); 1,308 mm (51.5 in) (roadster)
- Curb weight: 1,585 kg (3,494 lb) (coupé); 1,675 kg (3,693 lb) (roadster)

The Alfa Romeo 8C Competizione is a sports car produced by Italian marque Alfa Romeo between 2007 and 2010. It was first presented as a concept car at the 2003 Frankfurt Motor Show. The name refers to the eight-cylinder (cilindro in Italian) engine (8C) and Alfa Romeo's racing pedigree (Competizione, Italian for 'competition'). Responsible for creating the production version were Maserati engineers, who were working with Ferrari at the time; the 8C includes components from both brands. Its development proceeded in parallel with the GranTurismo, and production coincided with the global crisis. The company received over 1,400 orders for the 8C after the official announcement that the car would enter production. However, only 500 customers ended up with the 8C Competizione and another 329 with the 8C Spider, bringing the production total to 829 cars. Maserati dealers were responsible for servicing in the United States.

== 2003 concept car ==
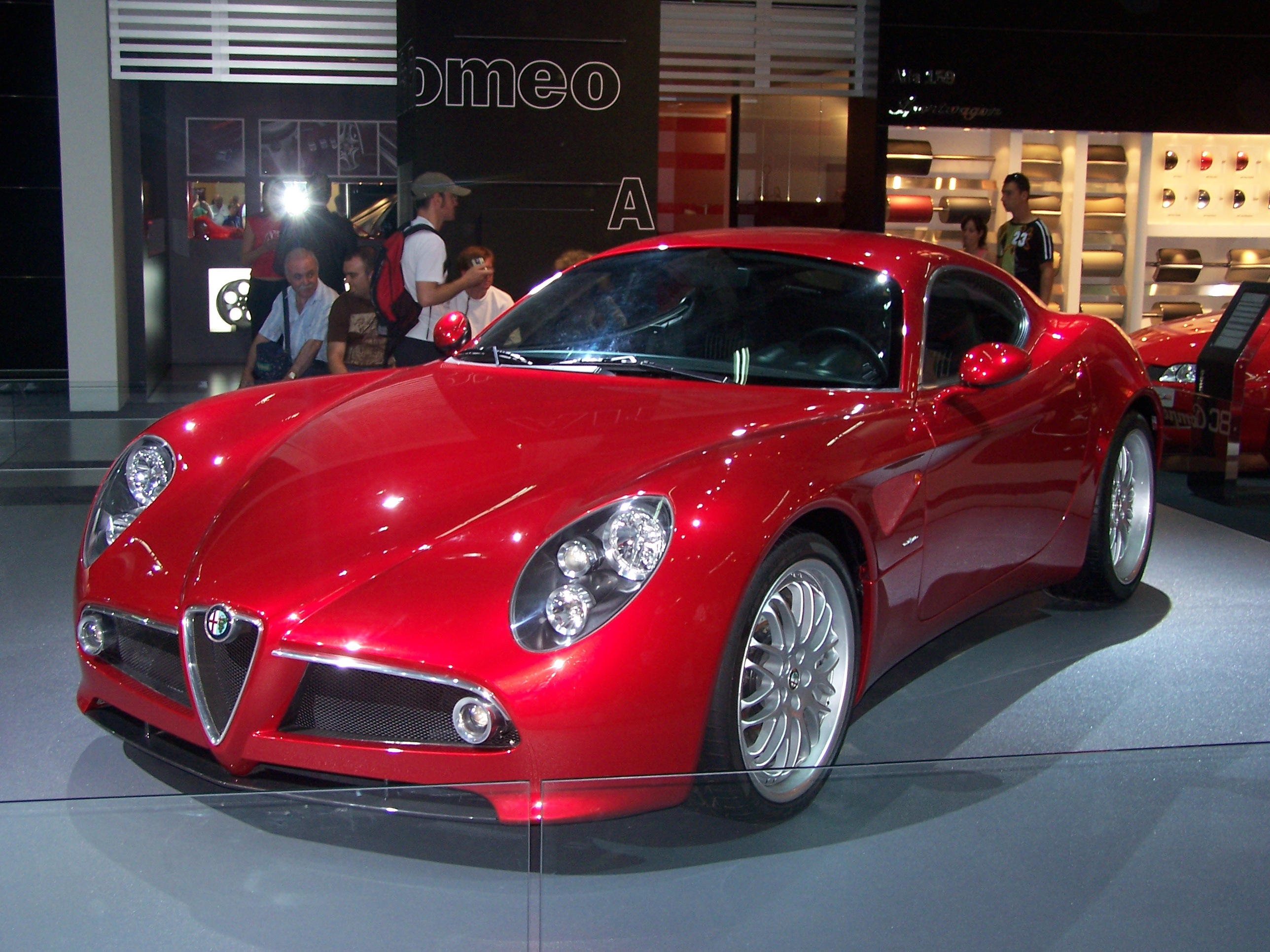
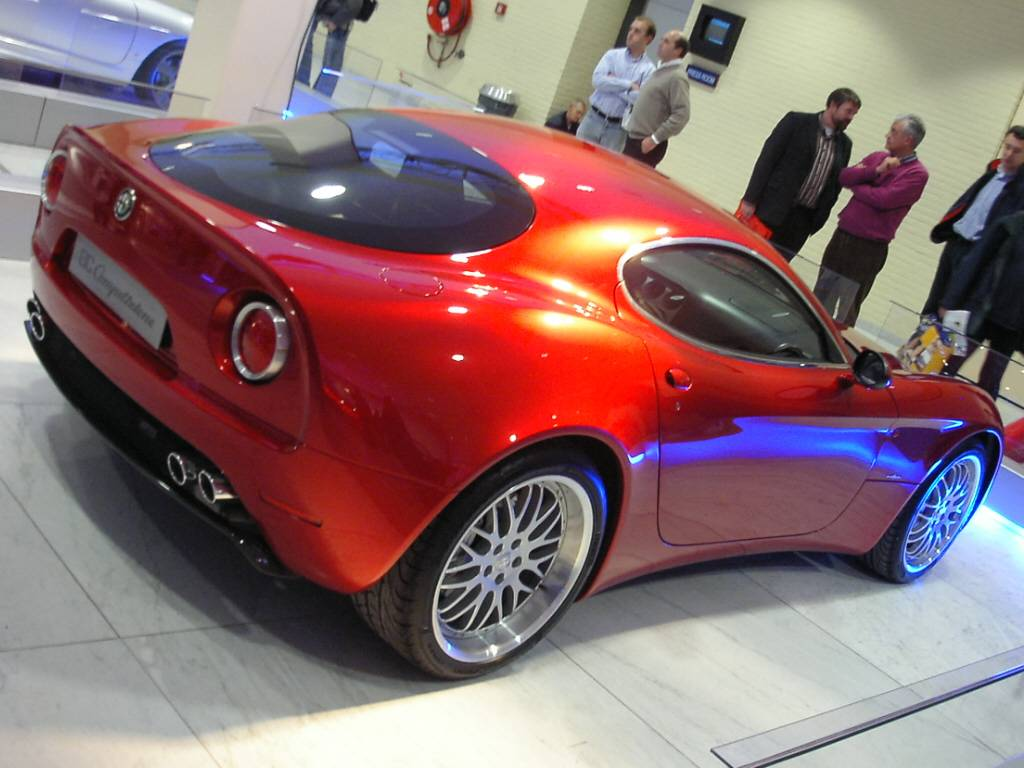
Alfa Romeo 8C concept

The 8C Competizione was first shown to the public at the Frankfurt Motor Show in 2003. Designed by Wolfgang Egger and Daniele Gaglione at Centro Stile Alfa Romeo, the lines of the twin seater are meant to echo the styling of Alfa Romeo automobiles of the 1950s and 1960s, and the "Competizione" name is a reference to the 1948 6C 2500 Competizione, which competed in the 1949 and 1950 Mille Miglia race and secured third position both times. It was in the latter of these two races that the car was driven by Juan-Manuel Fangio and Augusto Zanardi. It won the 1950 Targa Florio. A 3.0-litre prototype was built but not produced. These 6C 2500 models were among the last vehicles with links to the pre-war cars. The concept was purely meant to be a styling exercise with no drive train.

== 2007 production version ==
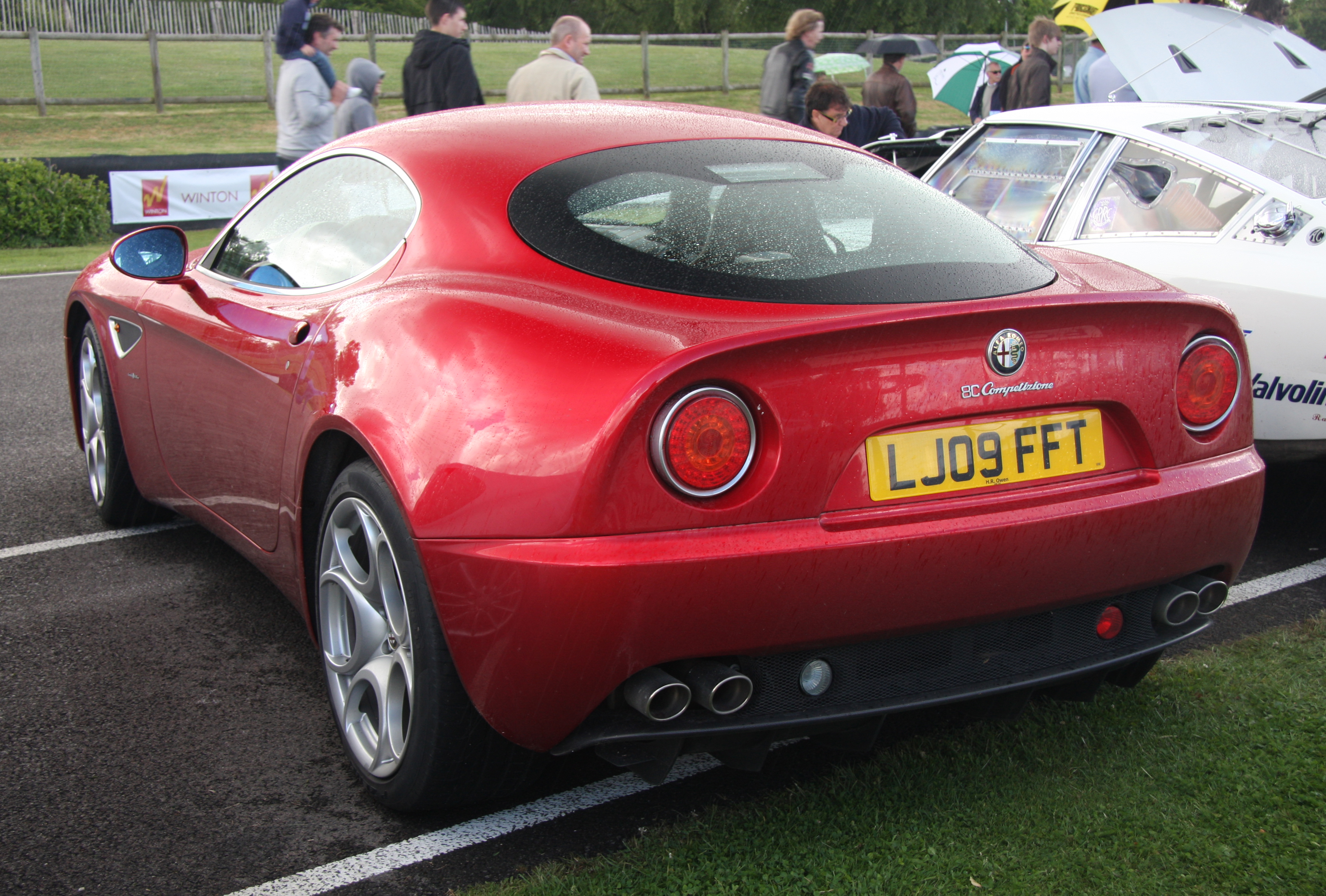
Rear view of the production version

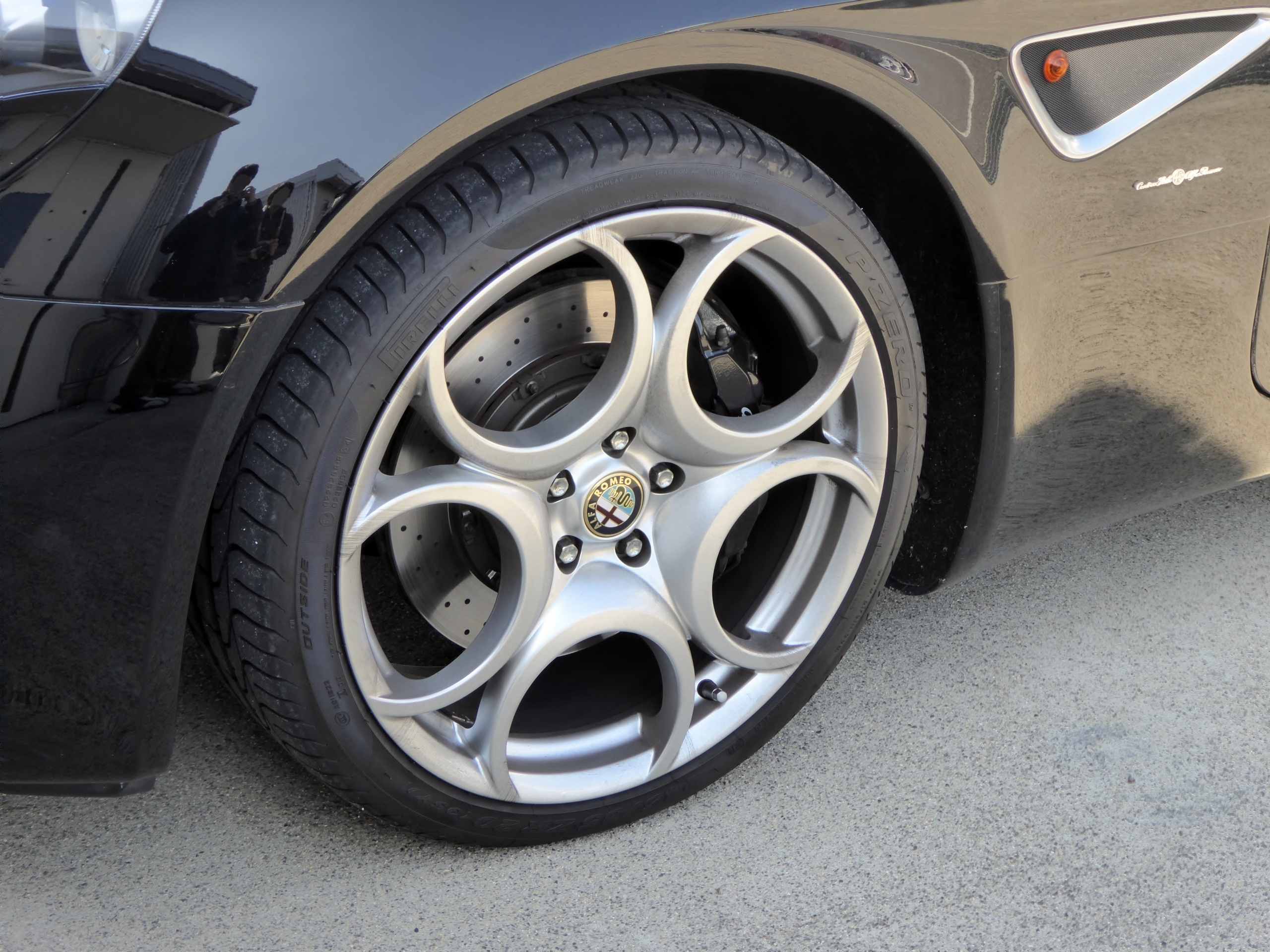
The 8C featured alloy wheels with a design that mimics the cloverleaf logo

During the Mondial de l'Automobile 2006, Alfa Romeo announced the production of the 8C Competizione (500 units). The production version is very similar to the concept; the biggest difference to the exterior being the rear-hinged hood. Other minor changes included the front lights, which used Xenon lamps, a standard wiper system, a mesh side vent, and the wheels, which had a design that mimicked the cloverleaf logo. The car came standard in Alfa Red or Black colours. Pearl Yellow and the Special Competition Red were also available as an option. Paint-to-sample colors were also available for an additional charge, and so, the cars were produced in a wide range of colours, such as white, with a Maserati range (Fuji White, Blue Avio, Blue Oceano, Grigio Nuvolari) and a Ferrari range (Blue Pozzi, Vinaccia {Aubergine}). The bodyshell is made of carbon fibre, produced by ATR Group.

The carbon fibre body is fitted to a steel chassis, made by Italian company ITCA Produzione. Final assembly took place at the Maserati factory in Modena.

An 8C Competizione was featured on the main sculpture at the 2010 Goodwood Festival of Speed. One of the two remaining Alfa Romeo P2s was also part of the display.

=== Powertrain ===
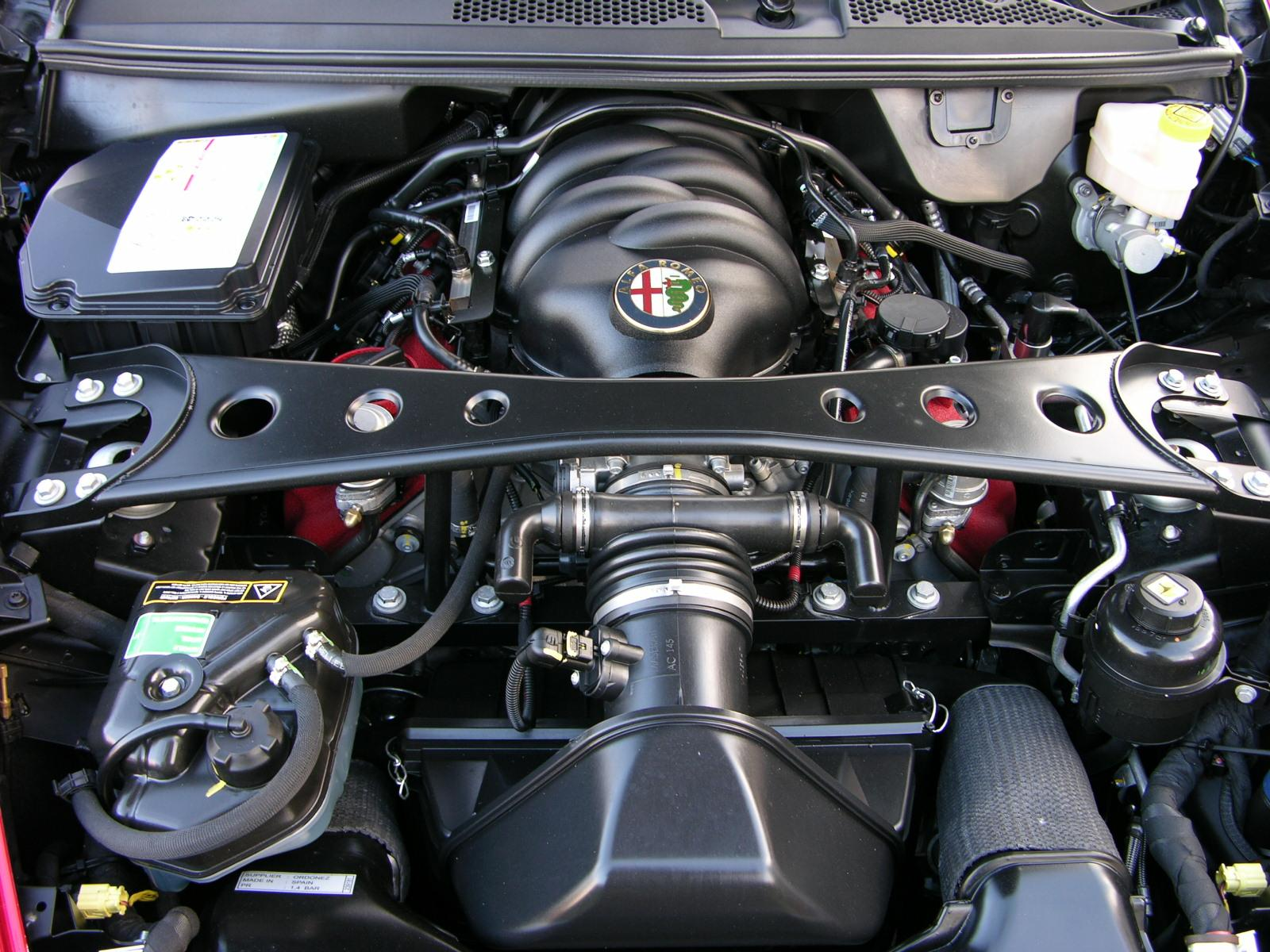
The Ferrari F136 Y V8 engine used in the 8C

The car uses a unique platform that shares several components with the Maserati GranTurismo. The powertrain features a Ferrari/Maserati derived cross-plane, wet sump lubricated 4.7 L (4,691 cc) 90° V8 engine assembled by Ferrari. The top engine performance figures may be summarized as a maximum power output of 331 kW (450 PS; 444 hp) at 7,000 rpm and a peak torque of 480 N⋅m (354 lb⋅ft) at 4,750 rpm (80% at 2,500 rpm) with an engine redline of 7,500 rpm and rev limiter of 7,600 rpm. The V8 engine has variable timing, intake valves and a compression ratio of 11.3:1.

The six–speed transaxle gearbox has computerized gear selection by means of paddles on the steering column and may be used in Manual-Normal; Manual-Sport; Automatic-Normal; Automatic-Sport and Wet modes. The gearbox can shift gears in 175 milliseconds when the Sport mode is selected. The car also features a limited-slip differential.

=== Performance ===
The 8C Competizione is fitted with specially developed 20-inch tyres: 245/35 at the front and 285/35 at the rear, wrapped around perforated wheels crafted from fluid moulded aluminium. The brakes of the car, which are Brembo carbon ceramic units, have been called "phenomenal" by Road & Track magazine, with a stopping distance of 32 m (105.0 ft), when travelling at an initial speed of 97 km/h (60 mph). The official top speed is officially quoted to be 292 km/h (181 mph) but it might be higher, with estimations that it could be around 306 km/h (190 mph) according to Road & Track magazine.

Alfa Romeo 8C Spider engine sound

Specifications
Top speed	292 km/h (181 mph) (official)
0–100 km/h (62 mph)	4.2 seconds
1/4 mile (402 m)	12.4 seconds at 116.4 mph (187.3 km/h)
Type	V8 engine
Displacement	4,691 cc (4.7 L; 286.3 cu in)
Power	331 kW (450 PS; 444 hp) at 7,000 rpm
Torque	480 N⋅m (354 lb⋅ft) at 4,750 rpm
Lateral Acceleration (200 feet (61 m) skidpad)	1.02 g
Fuel consumption (calculated from emissions)	16.25 L/100 km (17 mpg_{‑imp}; 14 mpg_{‑US})

== 8C Spider ==
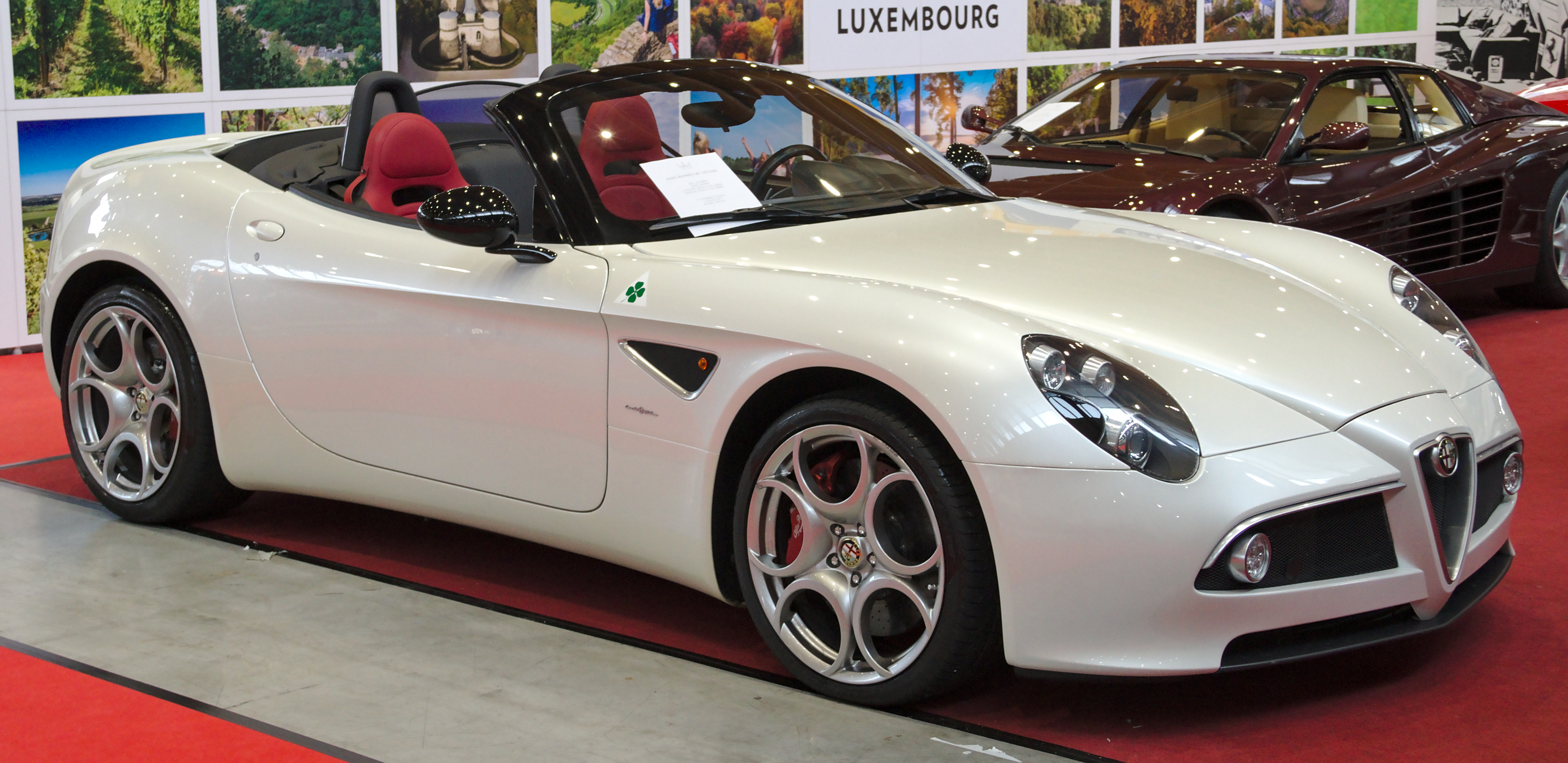
Alfa Romeo 8C Spider

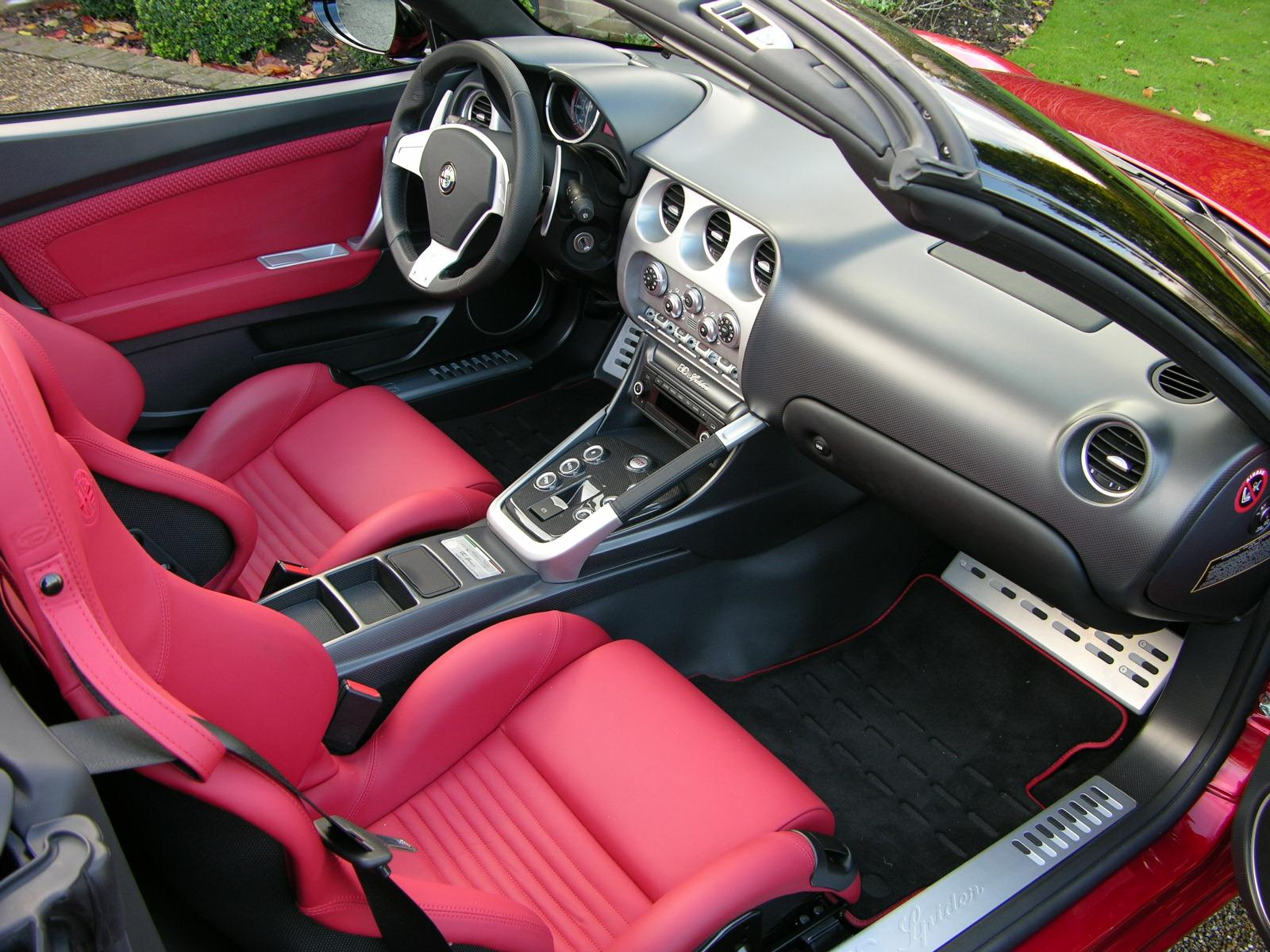
8C Spider interior

=== 2005 Spider concept ===
At the 2005 Pebble Beach Concours d'Elegance, Alfa Romeo unveiled the 8C Spider, a roadster version of the Competizione coupé concept presented in 2003. The Spider concept was built by Carrozzeria Marazzi. Production of the 8C Spider was confirmed by Sergio Marchionne on September 25, 2007. It was announced that the Spider would be built in a limited production run of 500 units and would cost around US$227,000 (€165,000), considerably more than the coupé version.

=== 2008 production version ===
The production version was unveiled at the 2008 Geneva Motor Show. Production of the 8C Spider began in 2009, in Modena, with Maserati in charge of manufacturing the cars as with the coupé. While 500 cars were originally to be produced, only 329 Spiders in total were produced due to the impact of the Great Recession. 35 of the 329 Spiders were destined for the United States. In the United States the 8C Spider had a base price of US$299,000. In the October 2011 issue of Evo (magazine) the 8C Spider won the title of the 'Best Sounding Car'.

Alfa Romeo claims that the 8C Spider's top speed is 290 km/h (180 mph), which makes it slightly slower than the coupé version. The brakes on the Spider are Brembo carbon-ceramic units. The Spider has a two-layer electrically operated fabric roof. The windshield frame is made of carbon fibre to try to maintain a 50/50 weight distribution.

== Coachbuilt variants ==
The 8C spawned bespoke versions from Carrozzeria Touring.

=== Alfa Romeo Disco Volante by Touring ===
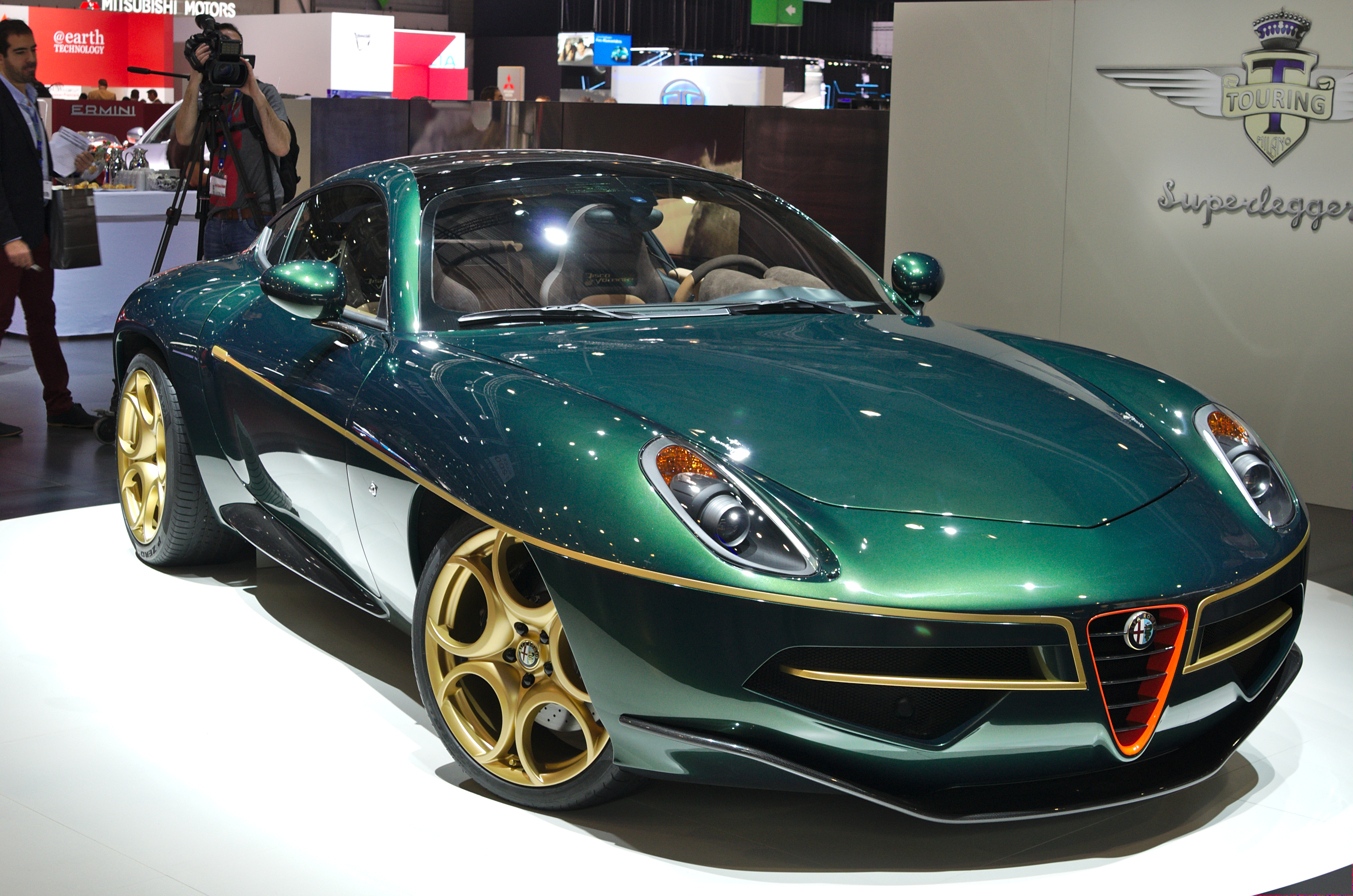
Alfa Romeo Disco Volante by Touring

The Alfa Romeo Disco Volante by Touring is a two-seater coupé based on the 8C Competizione, and built by Carrozzeria Touring in 2013. The model name is derived from the Disco Volante of the 1950s. Equipped with a front-mounted 4.7 litre V8, it produces 450 PS (331 kW; 444 hp) and 480 N⋅m (354 lbf⋅ft) of torque. The Disco Volante is rear-wheel-drive with a six-speed automated manual transmission. The transmission is a transaxle with a limited-slip differential, while the suspension is independent quadrilateral and made of aluminium.

The car is able to accelerate from 0 to 100 km/h (62 mph) in 4.2 seconds and can reach a top speed of 291 km/h (181 mph).

==== Spyder ====
A Spyder version of Disco Volante was presented at the Geneva Motor Show in March 2016. A limited series of seven cars were manufactured, based on the 8C Spider chassis.

== Production numbers, markets and notable owners ==
8C Competizione, original production numbers
Country	Number of cars
USA	90
Italy	80
Germany	80
Japan	70
France	40
United Kingdom	40
Switzerland	35
Others	65
Total	500

The 8C Competizione was built in a limited production run of 500 units, and Alfa Romeo originally earmarked the entire production among several specified markets (see table). The entire production of 500 cars quickly sold out. The 8C marked Alfa Romeo's return to the American market in 2008, after withdrawing in 1995. The first 8C was delivered to an Italian customer in October 2007. The first American-market 8C was seen in November 2008, wearing "001 USA" registration plates. The car was purchased by film director and stock exchange magnate James Glickenhaus, also known for being the owner of the bespoke Ferrari Enzo-based P4/5. The 8C's production run was completed by the end of 2008. The last Alfa Romeo 8C Competizione was delivered to the United States to an Italian-American car collector from the Boston area. The late Fiat CEO Sergio Marchionne owned both an 8C Competizione and an 8C Spider. Fiat President and owner John Elkann also owns an 8C Competizione in a special livery called Blu Oceano, which is part of the Maserati color range.
