= Yangwang =

Chinese luxury plug-in electric car brand owned by BYD Auto

Yangwang Auto
- Product type: Automobiles
- Current owner: BYD Auto
- Country: China
- Introduced: 2023; 3 years ago
- Markets: China
- Ambassador: Hu Xiaoqing (general manager)
- Website: yangwangauto.com

Chinese name
- Simplified Chinese: 仰望
- Traditional Chinese: 仰望
- Literal meaning: look up; admire
Transcriptions
Standard Mandarin
- Hanyu Pinyin: Yǎngwàng
- Wade–Giles: yang3-wang4
- IPA: /jɑŋ²¹⁴⁻²¹¹ wɑŋ⁵¹/
Yue: Cantonese
- Yale Romanization: yéuhng mohng
- Jyutping: joeng5 mong6
Southern Min
- Hokkien POJ: giáng-bōng

Yangwang Auto (Chinese: 仰望汽车; lit. 'looking up', 'admire') is a Chinese luxury electric car brand owned by BYD Auto and marketed by Shenzhen Yangwang Auto Sales Co., Ltd. The brand was introduced in January 2023. In the Chinese market, Yangwang vehicles occupies the price range above CN¥1 million (approximately US$140,000), competing with European luxury brands. As of 2024, Yangwang is positioned above two other BYD sub-brands, Denza and Fangchengbao.

Yangwang is the first brand to introduce BYD's proprietary individual wheel drive (IWD) technology platform called "e^{4}" (易四方). The brand logo is the Chinese character for "lightning" or "electricity" in oracle bone script.

== Products ==
The brand's first model, the U8 plug-in hybrid full-size SUV, was introduced on January 5, 2023, before its market launch in the Chinese market on April 18, 2023. During the presentation, BYD founder and CEO Wang Chuanfu personally drove a U8 onto the stage, while another U8 equipped with Mecanum wheels demonstrated the IWD technology by driving sideways and performing a tank-like rotation. Yangwang U8 is equipped with four electric motors and a 2.0-liter turbocharged engine. This power configuration will enable the vehicle's maximum output to reach 1,100 horsepower (820 kW). Under emergency situation such as floods, Yangwang U8 is able to float on the water like a car-boat.

At the same show, Wang also unveiled the U9, a battery electric sports car featuring the proprietary "DiSus" (云辇) active suspension system and a claimed 0-100 kph time of just 2 seconds. The "DiSus" system allows the vehicle to travel on three wheels when a tire bursts. BYD has divided the "DiSus" system into three different sub-systems named "DiSus-C", "DiSus-A" and "DiSus-P", while Yangwang U9 equips with the "DiSus-X" system (a special system reserved for the supercar) which combines all the attributes of three systems.

On September 7, 2023, BYD teased a new vehicle which is later named Yangwang U7, in a presentation at the annual Automobile Aerodynamics Academic Meeting hosted by the Society of Automotive Engineers of China (SAE). The new model reportedly has a drag coefficient of only 0.195.

=== Models ===
- Yangwang U7 (2025–present), full-size luxury sedan, PHEV and BEV
- Yangwang U8 (2023–present), full-size SUV range extended electric off-road capable, SUV
  - Yangwang U8L (2025–present), LWB variant of U8
- Yangwang U9 (2024–present), supercar, BEV
  - Yangwang U9X (2027–present), hypercar, BEV
- Yangwang Altior (2027–present), full-size ultra-luxury sedan
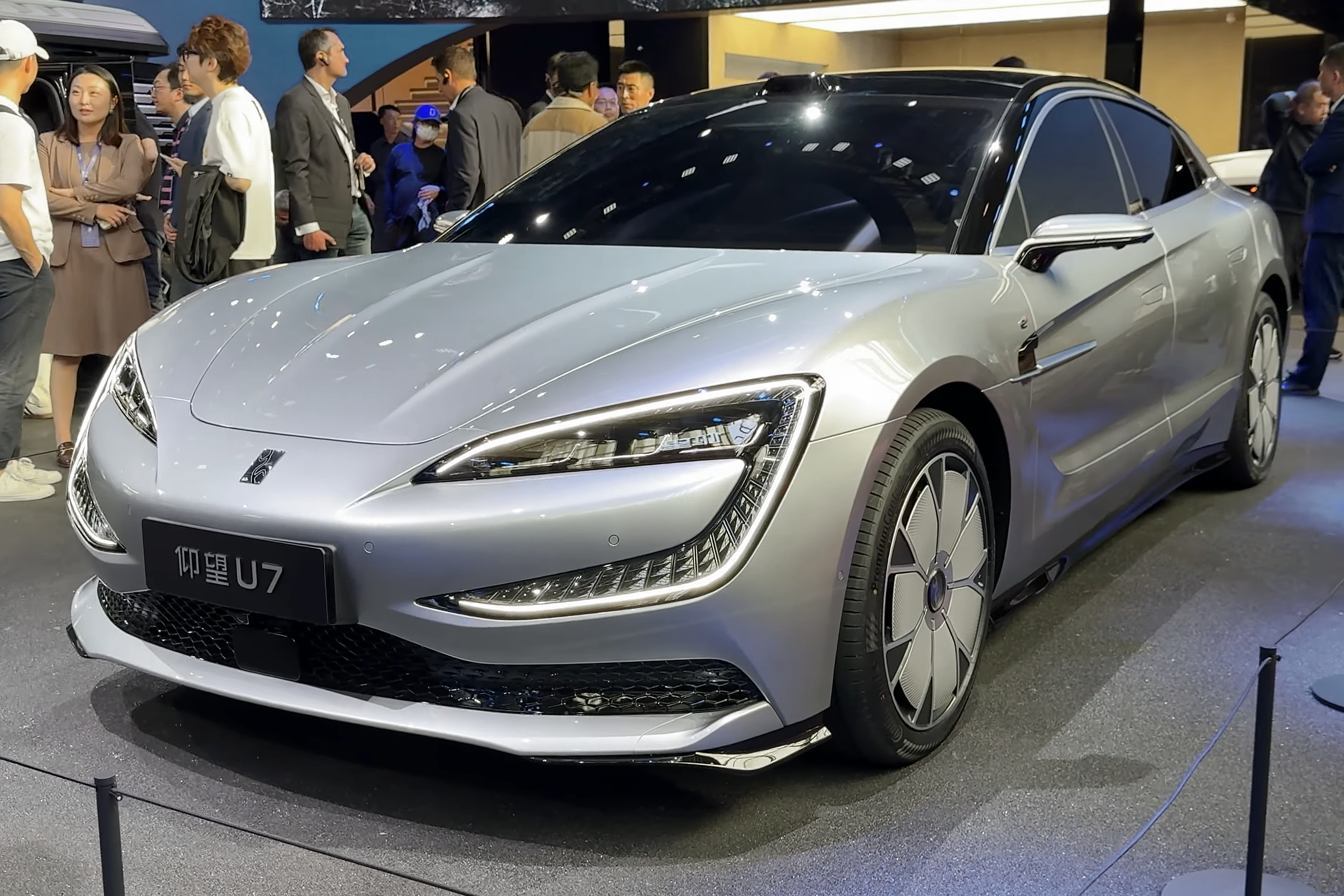
Yangwang U7

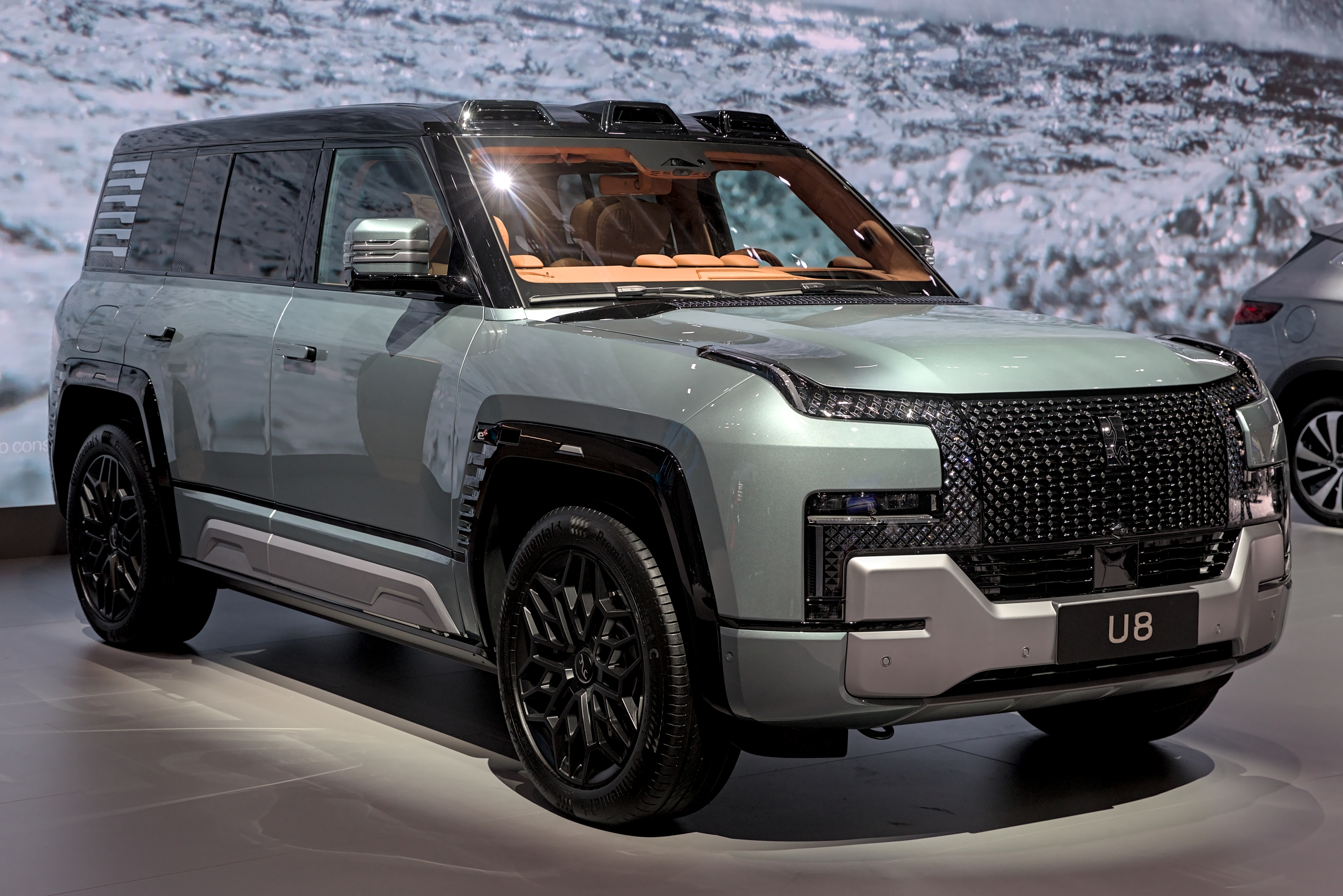
Yangwang U8

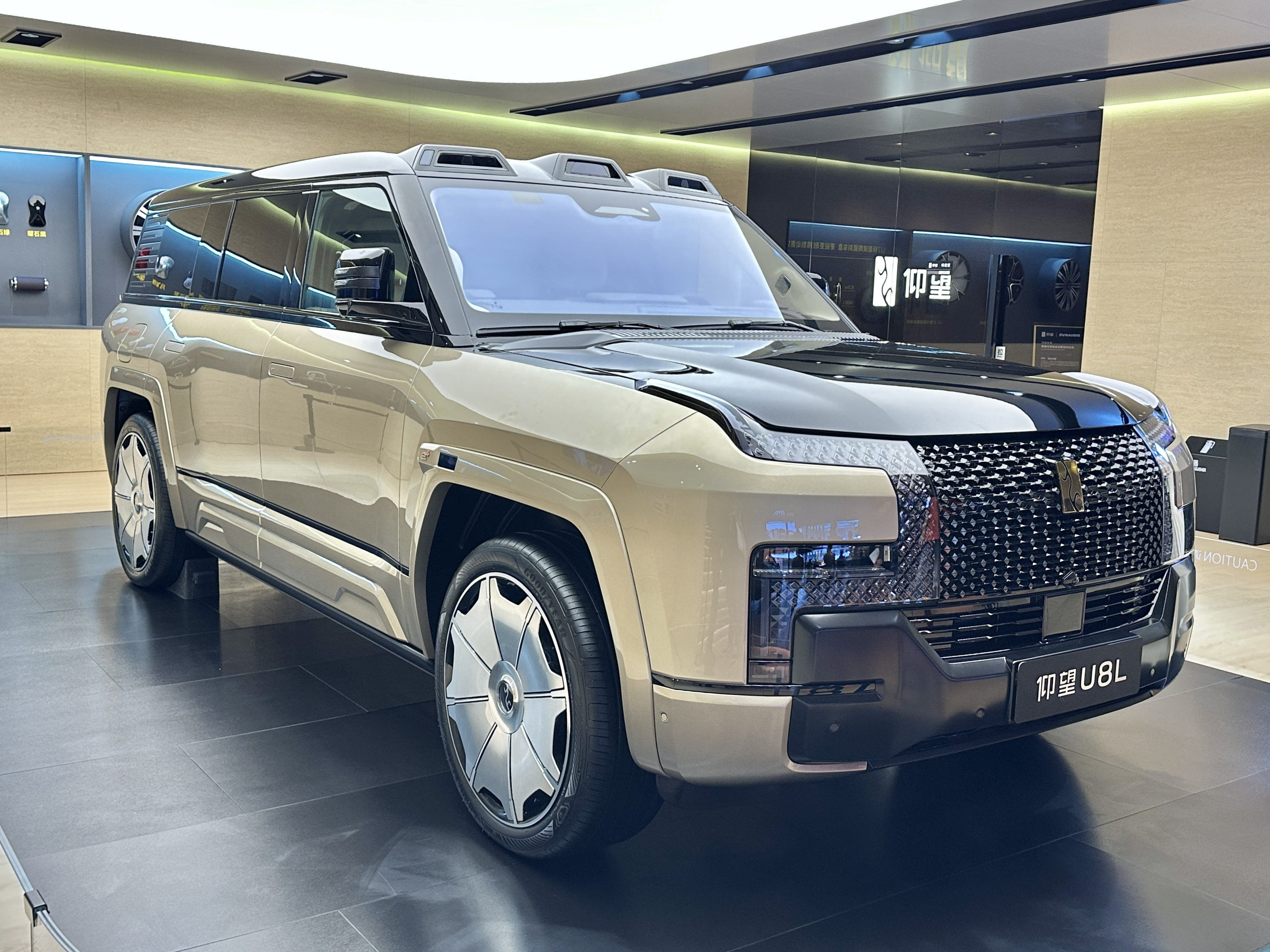
Yangwang U8L

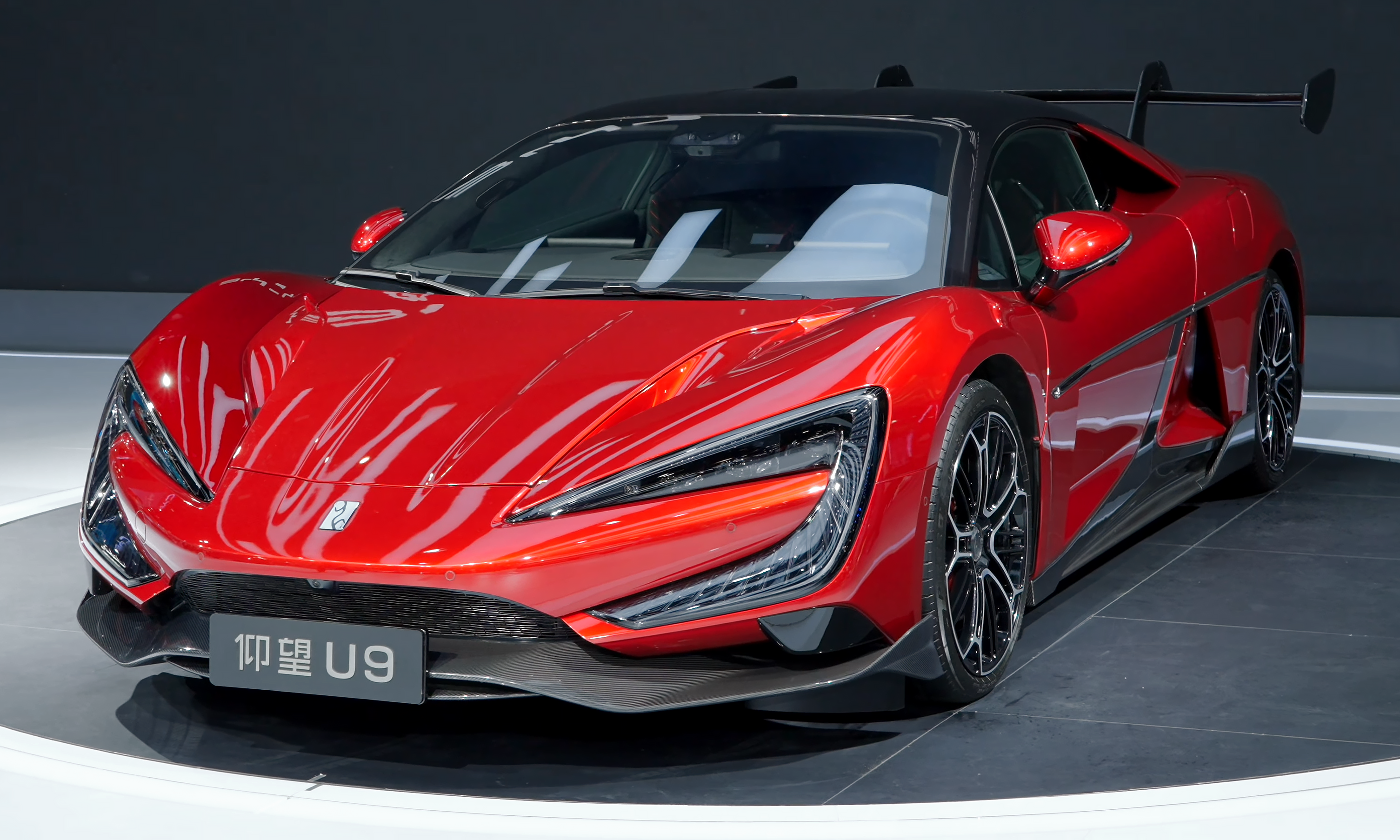
Yangwang U9

== Marketing ==
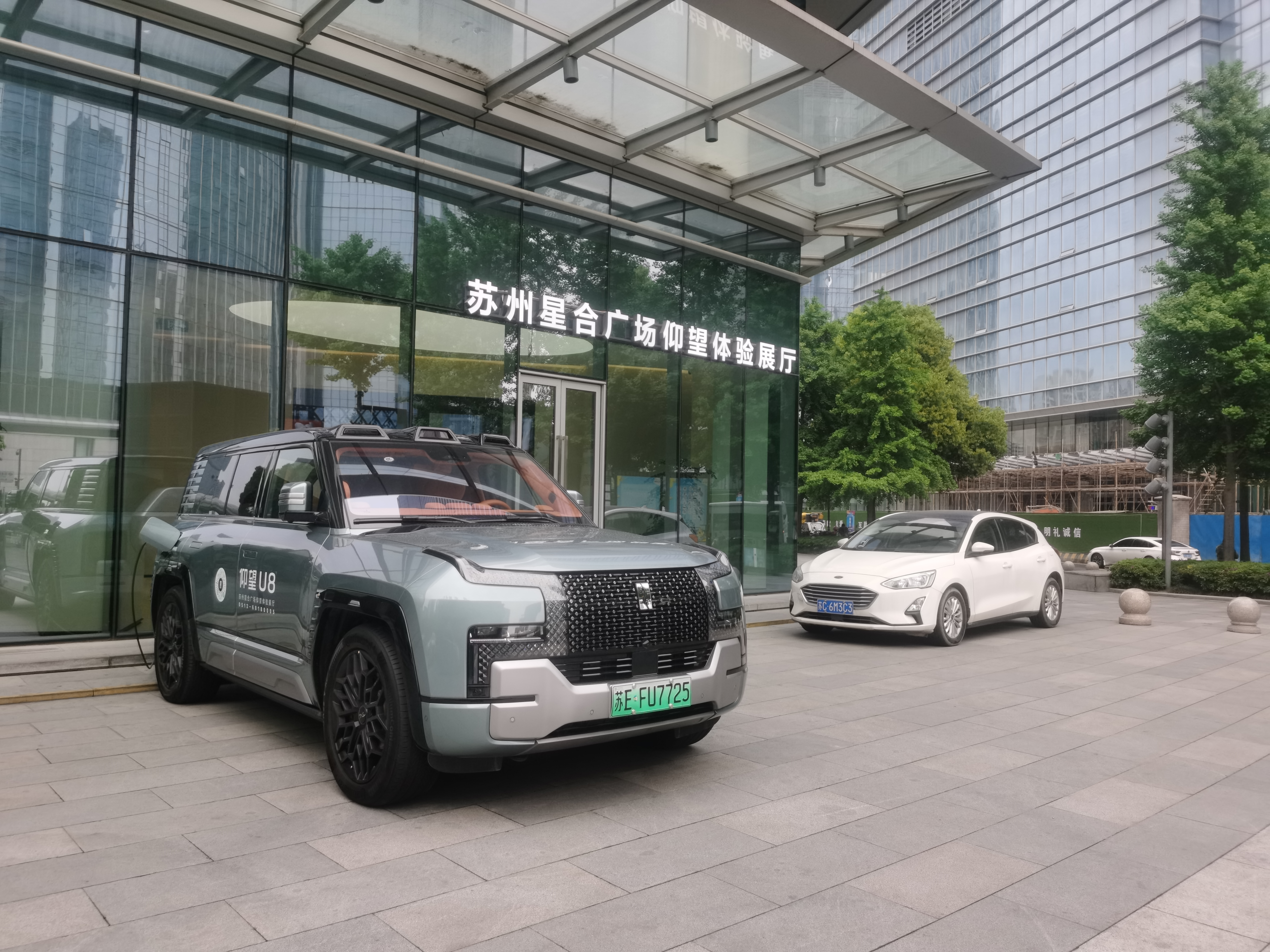
A Yangwang showroom in Suzhou

Yangwang opened its first showroom in Shanghai on 27 September 2023, located in the opposite of the Oriental Pearl Tower. As of October 2023, there were 60 Yangwang showrooms under construction, and the company plans to open 90 stores in 40 cities by the end of 2023 in China. Similar to Tesla in China, BYD implemented the opening of Yangwang showrooms as their first attempt into the direct-to-customer model for the sales of Yangwang products.

== See also ==
- BYD Auto
- List of BYD Auto vehicles
- Denza
- Fangchengbao
- Linghui
- Automobile manufacturers and brands of China
- List of automobile manufacturers of China
