= Yangwang U9 =

Battery electric super-coupe

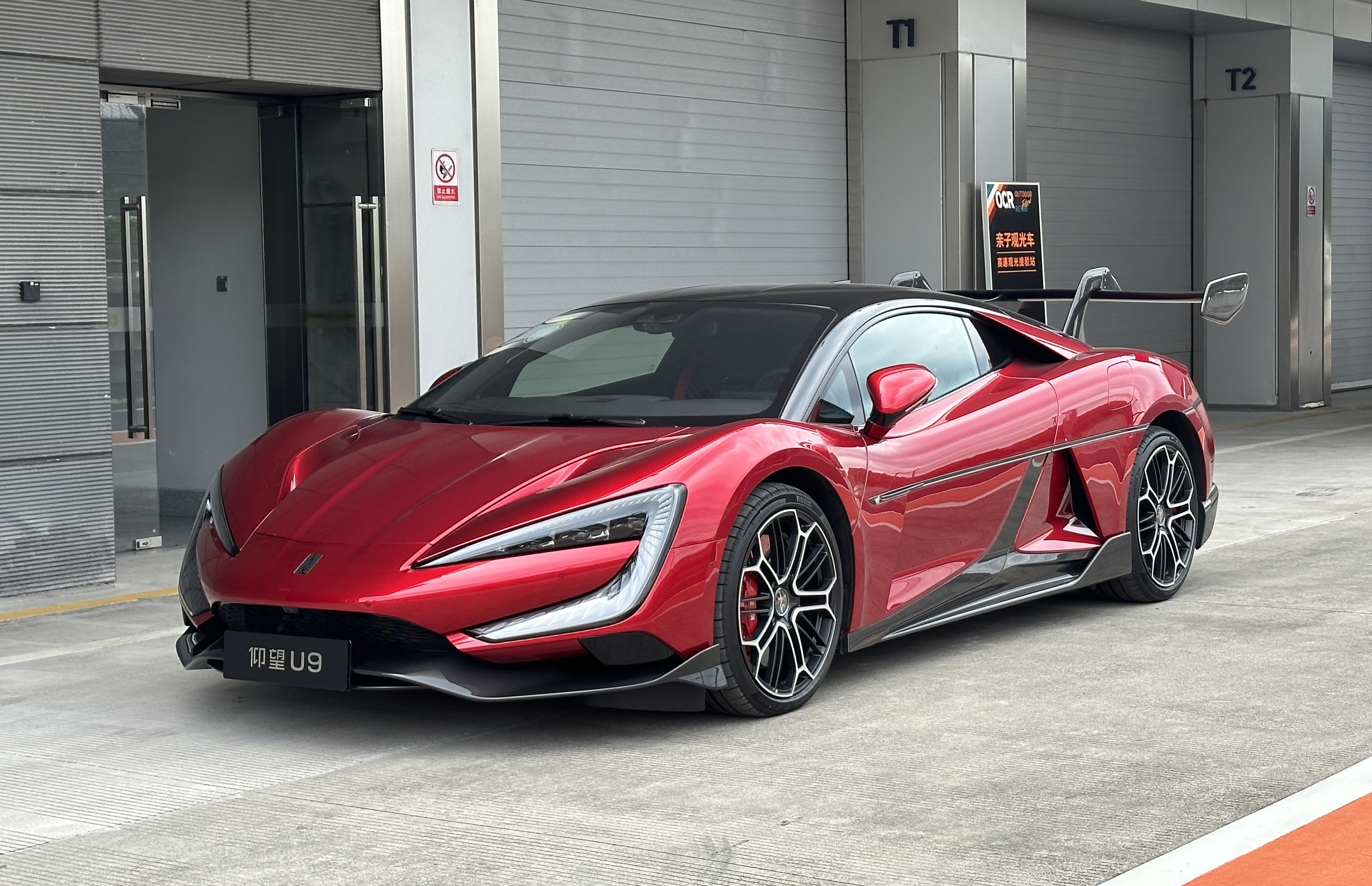

Overview
- Manufacturer: BYD Auto
- Production: August 2024 – present
- Assembly: China: Shenzhen, Guangdong
- Designer: Under the lead of Wolfgang Egger

Body and chassis
- Class: Sports car (S)
- Body style: 2-door coupe
- Layout: Four-motor, four-wheel-drive
- Platform: e⁴ platform (YiSiFang)
- Doors: Butterfly

Powertrain
- Electric motor: Permanent magnet
- Power output: 960–2,220 kW (1,287–2,977 hp; 1,305–3,018 PS)
- Battery: 80 kWh BYD Blade LFP
- Electric range: 450 km (280 mi) (CLTC)
- Plug-in charging: 7 kW (AC); 1200 V, 500 kW (DC, supports dual charging)

Dimensions
- Wheelbase: 2,900 mm (114.2 in)
- Length: 4,966 mm (195.5 in)
- Width: 2,029 mm (79.9 in)
- Height: 1,295 mm (51.0 in)
- Kerb weight: 2,475–2,480 kg (5,456–5,467 lb)

The Yangwang U9 (Chinese: 仰望U9; pinyin: Yǎngwàng U9) is a battery electric super-coupe manufactured by BYD Auto under its luxury car brand Yangwang. The U9 is the second vehicle from the Yangwang brand after the U8 off-road SUV, and was formally introduced on Auto Shanghai in April 2023. Its "Xtreme" variant has a top speed of 503.17 kilometres per hour (312.66 mph), a speed record that, as of November 2026, is officially recognised by the Guinness World Records as the fastest production car in the world.

== Overview ==
The U9 was developed by German car designer Wolfgang Egger, who previously was head designer for Alfa Romeo, Audi and Lamborghini, and began working for BYD in 2017.

The U9 was first introduced on 6 April 2023, and went on sale in February 2024. Mass production officially started on 16 August 2024.

The U9 achieved an uncertified Nürburgring Nordschleife lap time of 7 minutes and 17.9 seconds in November 2024. It also achieved a straight-line top speed of 391.94 km/h (243.54 mph), making it the fastest Chinese car in serial production.

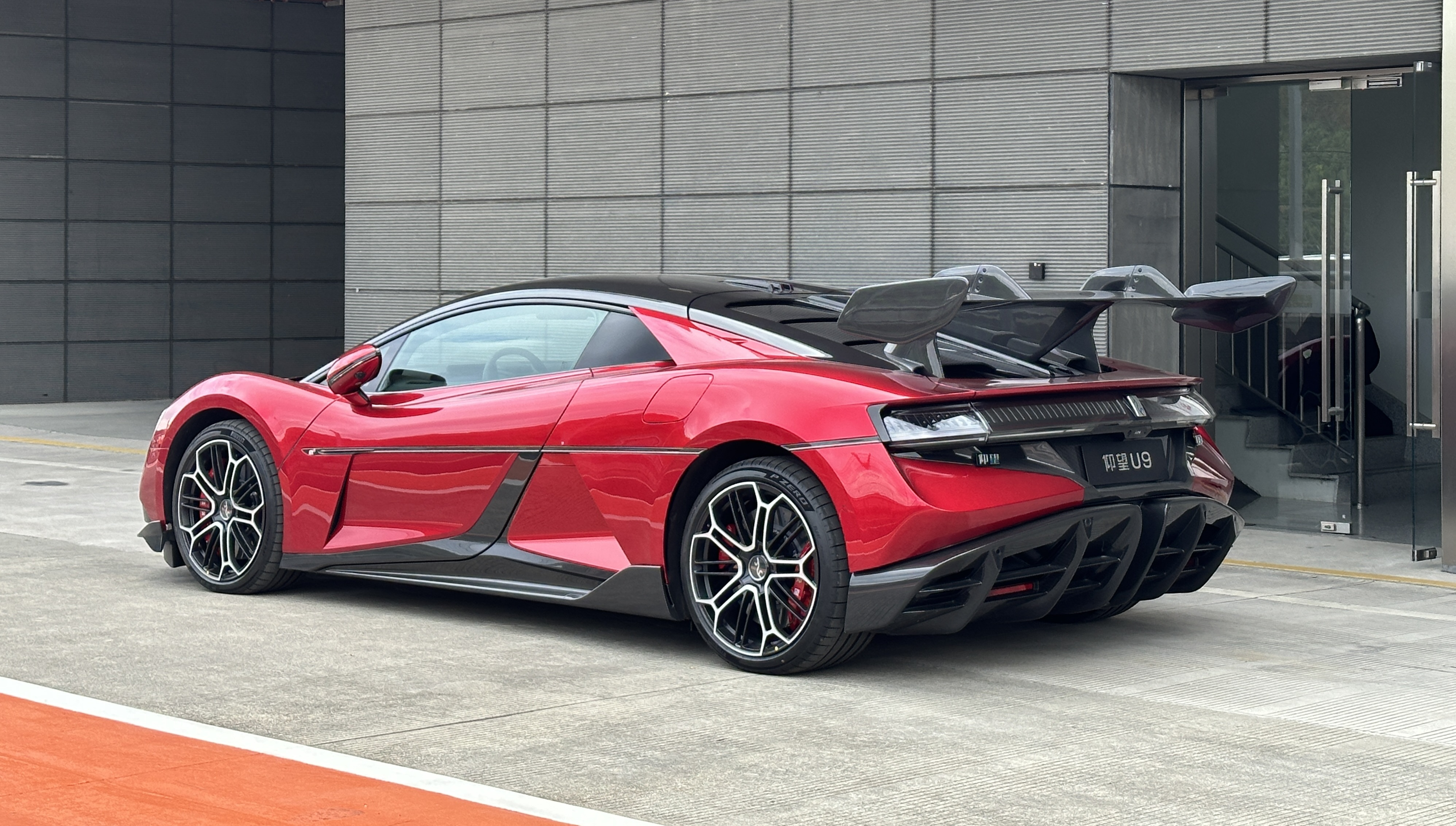
Rear view

== Specifications ==
The U9 is equipped with four 240 kW (322 hp; 326 PS) electric motors providing a total power output of 960 kW (1,287 hp; 1,305 PS) and a maximum range of 450 km (280 mi) on the China Light-Duty Vehicle Test Cycle (CLTC). BYD reported a 0–100 km/h (62 mph) acceleration time of 2.36 seconds, and a 1/4 mi (402 m) drag race time of 9.78 seconds.

The U9 is built with an 800V electrical architecture, with a maximum DC charging power of 500 kW. The charging duration between 30% and 80% is 10 minutes. The U9 also supports dual charging (plugging in two chargers simultaneously) to increase charging rate.

Like the U8, the U9 features BYD's proprietary "e^{4}" (易四方) individual wheel drive system, which enables the vehicle to redistribute torque among the four wheels in case of traction loss or a tyre puncture at speed; and the "DiSus" (云辇) active suspension system, which allows the wheels' ground clearance to be readjusted individually and even to perform a brief vertical jump. The active suspension consists of three different systems; DiSus-C controls variable damping, DiSus-A controls the air suspension, and DiSus-P controls the hydraulic system. Regarding the vertical jump, the U9 will shrink first, then bounce up, launching all four wheels off the ground at the same time. BYD has not announced the specific reason for the jump function on the U9, but the function demonstrates the "DiSus-X" body control system.

It was launched in 2024 with a price of 1.68 million Yuan (USD 236,000; EUR 215,000).

In August 2025, specifications of the Yangwang U9 Xtreme were released by the MIIT. It retains the individual wheel drive system, but changes the motors to the TZ240XYA model which output to 555 kW (744 hp; 755 PS) each for a total of 2,220 kW (2,977 hp; 3,018 PS), making it the most powerful production car ever built. It is equipped with smaller 20-inch wheels with the front tire width increasing from 275 mm to 325 mm to match the rears. In August 2025, an engineering test prototype of the U9X broke the record for the fastest top speed of an electric car, which reached 472.41 km/h (293.54 mph). In November 2026, the tyres were upgraded to Giti rated for 530 km/h (330 mph).Underline

== World records ==
On 14 September 2025, BYD officially unveiled the Yangwang U9 Xtreme, a track-focused version of the U9. It is currently the most powerful production model of the U9. It achieved a maximum speed of 496.22 km/h (308.33 mph) at Germany’s ATP Automotive Testing Papenburg. It was driven by German track specialist Marc Basseng. Yangwang also announced a Nürburgring Nordschleife lap time of 6 minutes 59.157 seconds. Production will be limited to 30 units for global markets.

On 1 November 2026, Yangwang U9 Xtreme broke its own record with an achieved speed of 503.17 kilometres per hour (312.66 mph) on the Sheikh Khalifa Bin Zayed International Road (E11) in Abu Dhabi, driven again by Basseng. The FIA officially recognised the record.

== Media ==
The U9 was added into Gran Turismo 7 as a playable vehicle alongside the Renault Twingo and the Porsche 911 Turbo S Leichtbau as a part of update 1.69, released in 22 April 2026.

== Sales and production ==
Year	Sales
Year	China
2024	88
2025	104
