= Uni Wheel =

Novel wheel design incorporating planetary gears

The Uni Wheel is a novel wheel design designed by Hyundai and Kia for use in electric vehicles. It incorporates several elements of the drive train into the wheel itself using a system of planetary gears. The name is an abbreviation of Universal Wheel Drive System.

The Uni Wheel is intended to gain the advantages of individual wheel drive without having to mount the motor directly to, or inside, the wheel. Instead, it subsumes the functions of constant-velocity joints, drive shaft and reduction gearing into a single system within the wheel.

The system has a central sun gear, linked by two articulated systems of pinion gears to an enclosing ring gear. It provides both gear reduction and decoupling of the rotation axis of the wheel from the rotation axis of the motor, allowing the motor to be mounted rigidly to the chassis, with the axial loads on the wheel being taken entirely by the suspension system, and also allowing the wheel to be driven at higher speed but lower torque by a smaller-diameter drive shaft.

The increased number of gears within the wheel has been identified as a point of concern in relation to possible noise and complexity problems.
