= Individual wheel drive =

Drivetrain where wheels receive torque from motors independent of each other

Concept (top view): In a vehicle, motors M1 through M4 drive respective wheels independently, possibly through respective gear arrangements.

Individual-wheel drive (IWD) is an automobile design in which the vehicle has an all-wheel drive powertrain that consists of multiple independent traction motors each supplying torque to a single drive wheel. The term was coined to identify electric vehicles with a four-motor layout, where each wheel is driven by an individual electric motor, as opposed to the differential drivetrain seen in conventional four wheel drive (4WD) ICE vehicles and the dual-motor 4WD design seen in many plug-in electric vehicles.

== Characteristics ==
These vehicles inherently have a range of characteristics built-in that can exceed the level of control commonly attributed to four-wheel drive vehicles or vehicles with extensive control systems. These characteristics may include:

- Precise individual control of torque to each wheel
- Anti-skid
- If one motor fails, the other motors are powerful enough to drive the vehicle to the nearest repair shop
- Easier replacement of motors
- No – possibly long and heavy – drive shafts, no central gear box and no mechanical differentials or lockers, reducing vehicle weight, reducing or eliminating transmission losses and simplifying its construction
- On-the-spot, zero-radius turning like a tracked vehicle by rotating the drive-wheels in opposite directions
- On-the-fly switching between front-wheel, rear-wheel and all-wheel drive configurations

The motors that are used in these vehicles are commonly wheel hub motors, since no transmission components are then required. Alternative layouts with inboard motors and drive shafts are also possible.

== Hydraulic wheel drive ==
Hydraulic wheel drives share many of the same features as an electric wheel drive. They also lack the need for a central gear box, mechanical differentials, drive shafts, and provide on the fly switching between front, rear and all-wheel drive. Hydraulic individual wheel drives are standard in various machines, such as zero-turn mowers, multi one lifts / front end loaders, and forklifts. Hydraulic drives are primarily found in machines that serve uses which benefit from the ability to "turn on a dime", i.e. with an exceptionally short turning diameter, and move between forward and reverse modes without shifting gears, such as lawn mowers and loading equipment.

== Examples ==
=== Quad-motor ===
- Rivian R1S
- Rivian R1T
- Zeekr 001 FR
- Yangwang U8
- Yangwang U9
- Mengshi 917
- Lotus Evija
- Rimac Nevera
- Mercedes-Benz G 580 with EQ Technology
- Lightyear 0
- Aspark Owl
- Ferrari Luce
- Jetour Shanhai T7

=== Tri-motor ===
- Tesla Cybertruck – The tri-motor version has individual motors on the rear wheels and a third motor shared between the front wheels.

== See also ==
- Direct-drive mechanism
- Drive-by-wire
- Skid-steer loader
- Torque steer
- Torque vectoring
- Uni Wheel
- Zero-turn mower
- Dual-motor, four-wheel-drive layout
