= Wolfgang Egger =

German car designer (born 1963)

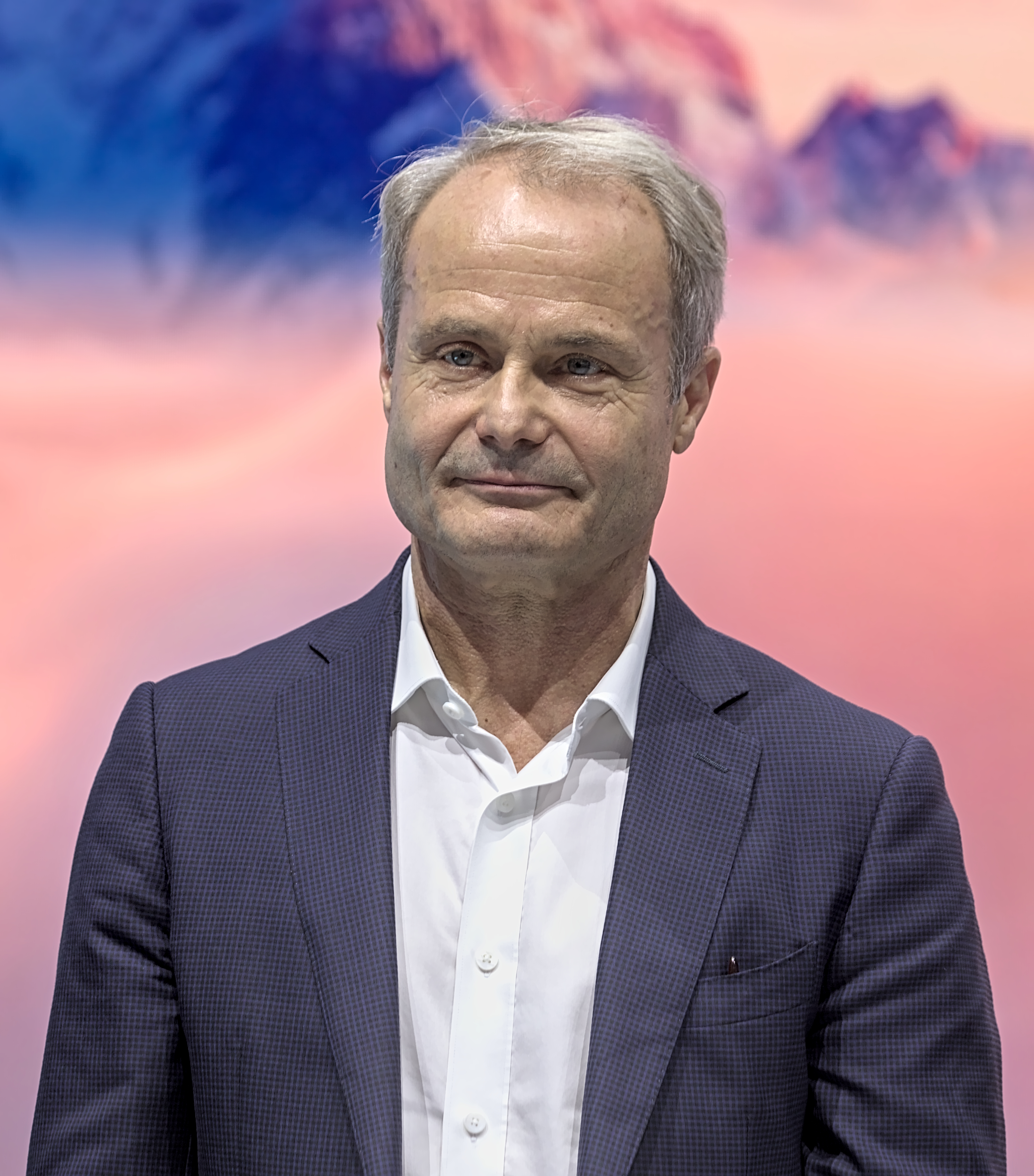
- Wolfgang Egger, 2023
- Born: 13 February 1963 (age 63); Oberstdorf, West Germany
- Education: International College of Arts and Sciences, Milan
- Occupation: Automotive designer

Wolfgang Josef Egger (born 13 February 1963) is a German car designer who formerly was a head designer for the European luxury car brands Alfa Romeo, Audi and Lamborghini, and currently is the head designer for Chinese electric vehicle manufacturer BYD Auto.

== Biography ==
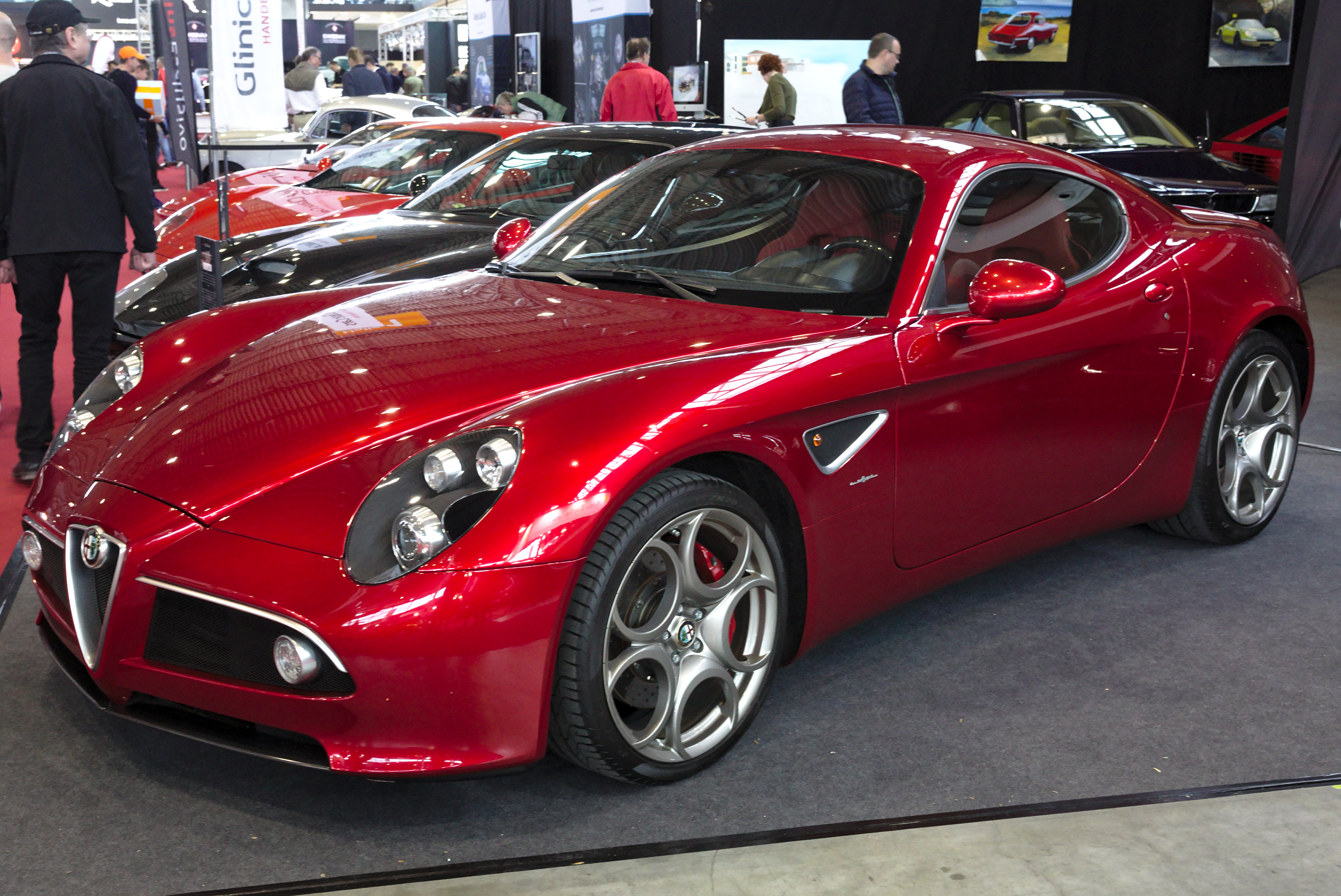
Alfa Romeo 8C Competizione, designed by Wolfgang Egger

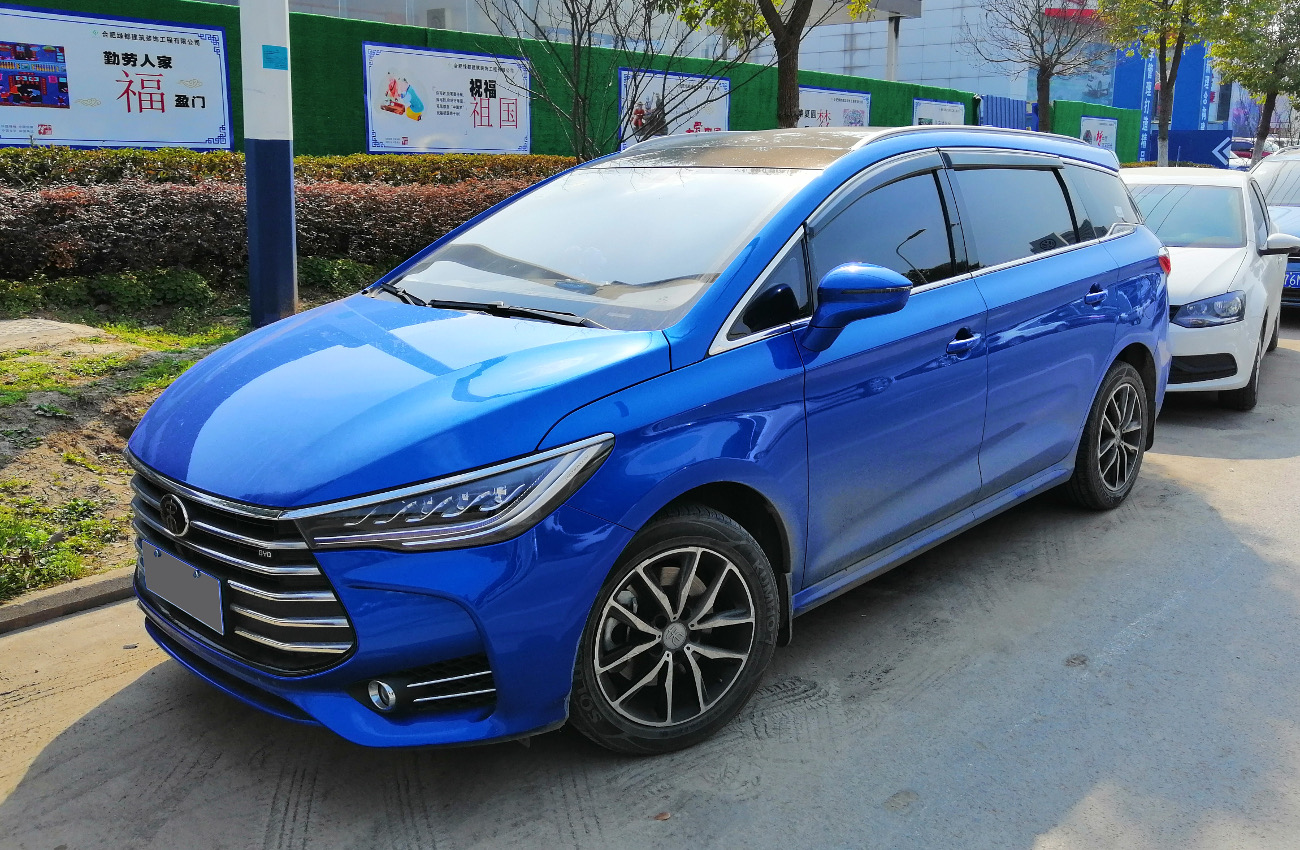
BYD Song Max, designed by Wolfgang Egger

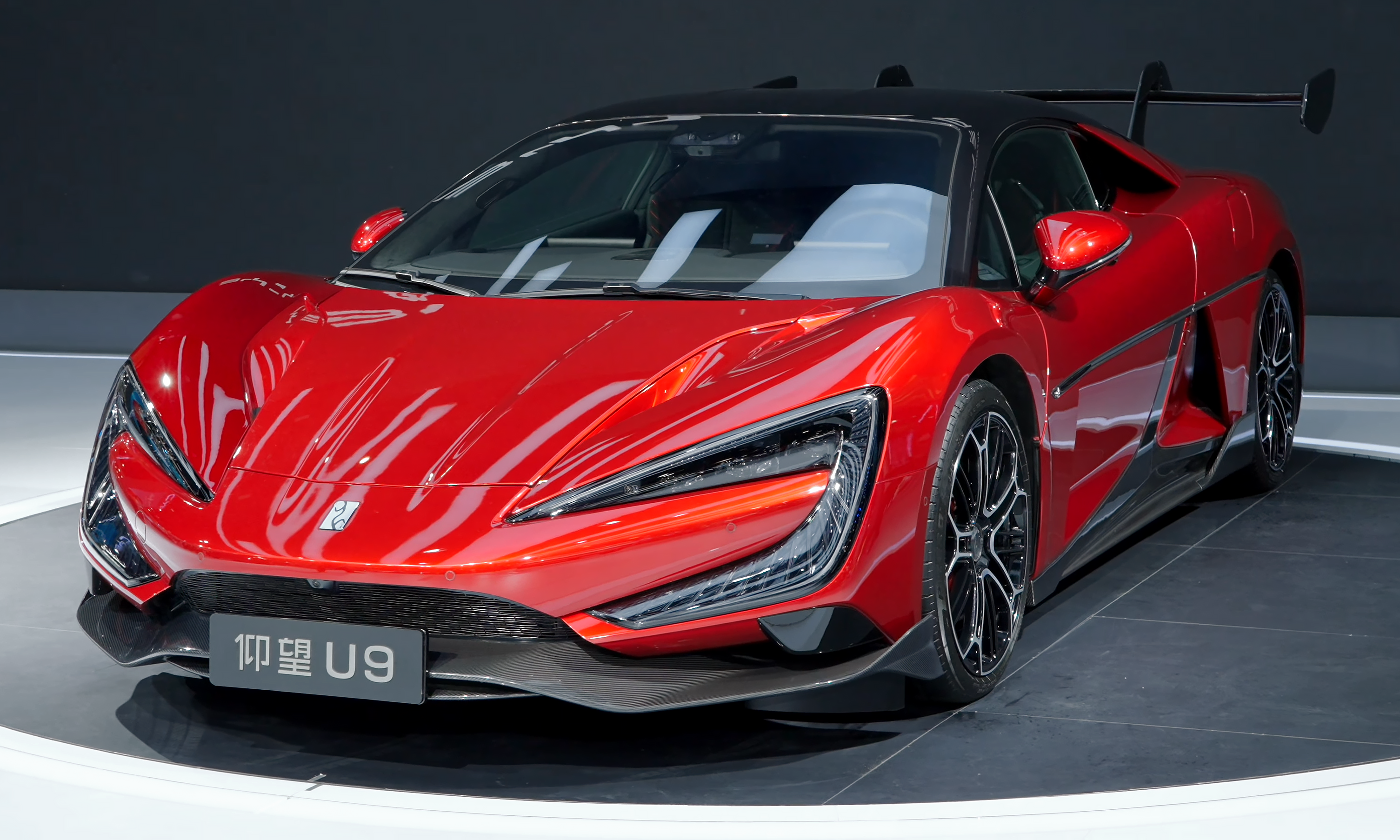
Yangwang U9, designed by Wolfgang Egger

Egger was born in Oberstdorf, Germany, and studied design at the International College of Arts and Sciences in Milan, Italy. In 1989, he graduated as an industrial designer. Egger began his professional career in 1989 in the Design department at Alfa Romeo. In 1993, he was appointed Chief Designer of Alfa Romeo.

In 1998, he became Chief Designer at SEAT, where he was able to input his personal style in, for example, the SEAT Ibiza, Cordoba and Altea.

In 2001, Egger was appointed Head of Design at Lancia. In the same year, however, he returned to Alfa Romeo as Chief Designer. Among the cars developed by Alfa Romeo under his direction were the Nuvola Concept, 156, 166, 147 and 8C Competizione.

On 1 May 2007, Egger succeeded Walter de Silva as Head of Audi Group Design. Then he was responsible for the Audi and Lamborghini brands.

On 6 Dec 2013, Egger left Audi design. Egger was replaced by Walter de Silva who became chief of design for all of VW's makes: Porsche, Audi, VW, Skoda, SEAT. In order to lure DeSilva to VW, VW added three Italian makes: Lamborghini, Ducati and ItalDesign coach house.

In 2017, Egger became design director for BYD. The Chinese automaker appointed him to create their design identity, starting with the hybrid model BYD Song Max and a series of other electric vehicles including the BYD B series bus. As such, he has also been responsible for the BYD group's sub-brands, including Denza, Fangchengbao and Yangwang.
