= RT1 =

RT1 or RT-1 may refer to:

- RT-1, an intercontinental ballistic missile design
- RT1 (Rodalies de Catalunya), a commuter rail line
- RT1, an electric car prototype developed by Seattle City Light

== See also ==
- RT (disambiguation)
- Rivian R1T, an electric pick-up truck
- TR1 (disambiguation)
