= Arty =

Arty may refer to:

== People ==
- Arty (queen), 8th century BC wife of Pharaoh Shebitku
- Arty (musician) (born 1989), Russian record producer and DJ born Artem Stolyarov
- Arty Ash, stage name of British actor Arthur Richard Dodge (1895–1954)
- A nickname of Ray Holmes (1914–2005), British Royal Air Force fighter pilot who rammed a German bomber during the Battle of Britain, protecting Buckingham Palace
- Arty Hill, 21st century American country music singer-songwriter
- Arty McGlynn (1944–2019), Irish guitarist
- Mary Ann Arty (1926–2000), American politician

== Other uses ==
- Arty (magazine), an independent British art fanzine started in 2001
- Military term for artillery

== See also ==
- Artie, a masculine given name
- Artie, West Virginia, United States, an unincorporated community
- RT (disambiguation)
- Artemis (disambiguation)
