= Artie =

Artie is usually a masculine given name, it is also usually a diminutive of Arthur. Notable people with the given name include:

== People ==
- Artie Bettles (1891–1971), Australian rules footballer
- Artie Butler (born 1942), American popular music arranger, songwriter and pianist
- Artie Cobb (born 1942), American poker player
- Artie Diamond (1929–1976), American boxer
- Artie P. Hatzes (born 1957), American astronomer
- Artie Kornfeld (born 1942), American musician, record producer and music executive best known as the music promoter for the Woodstock Festival
- Artie Lange (born 1967), American actor and comedian on The Howard Stern Show and Mad TV
- Artie Malvin (1922–2006), American composer and vocalist on The Crew Chiefs and with Glenn Miller's band
- Artie Pew Jr. (1898–1959), American college football and basketball player
- Artie Shaw (1910–2004), American jazz clarinetist, composer and bandleader
- Artie Simek (1916–1975), American calligrapher best known as a letterer for Marvel Comics
- Artie Smith (born 1970), American former National Football League player
- Artie Thomas (1884–1960), Australian rules footballer
- Artie Wood (1898–1959), Australian rules footballer and coach
- Artie Young (fl. 1930s–1940s), African-American dancer and actress

== Fictional characters ==
- Artie Abrams, on the FOX television series Glee
- Artie Bucco, on the HBO television series The Sopranos
- Artie Maddicks, a Marvel Comics character, affiliated with the X-Men
- Artie, the Strongest Man in the World, on the Nickelodeon sitcom The Adventures of Pete and Pete
- Artie Nielsen, on the television series Warehouse 13
- Artie Ziff, on the FOX animated sitcom The Simpsons
- Arthur Pendragon (Shrek), in the animated film Shrek the Third

== See also ==
- Arte Johnson, American comic actor
- Arty (disambiguation)
