= Rivian R1S =

American electric full-size SUV

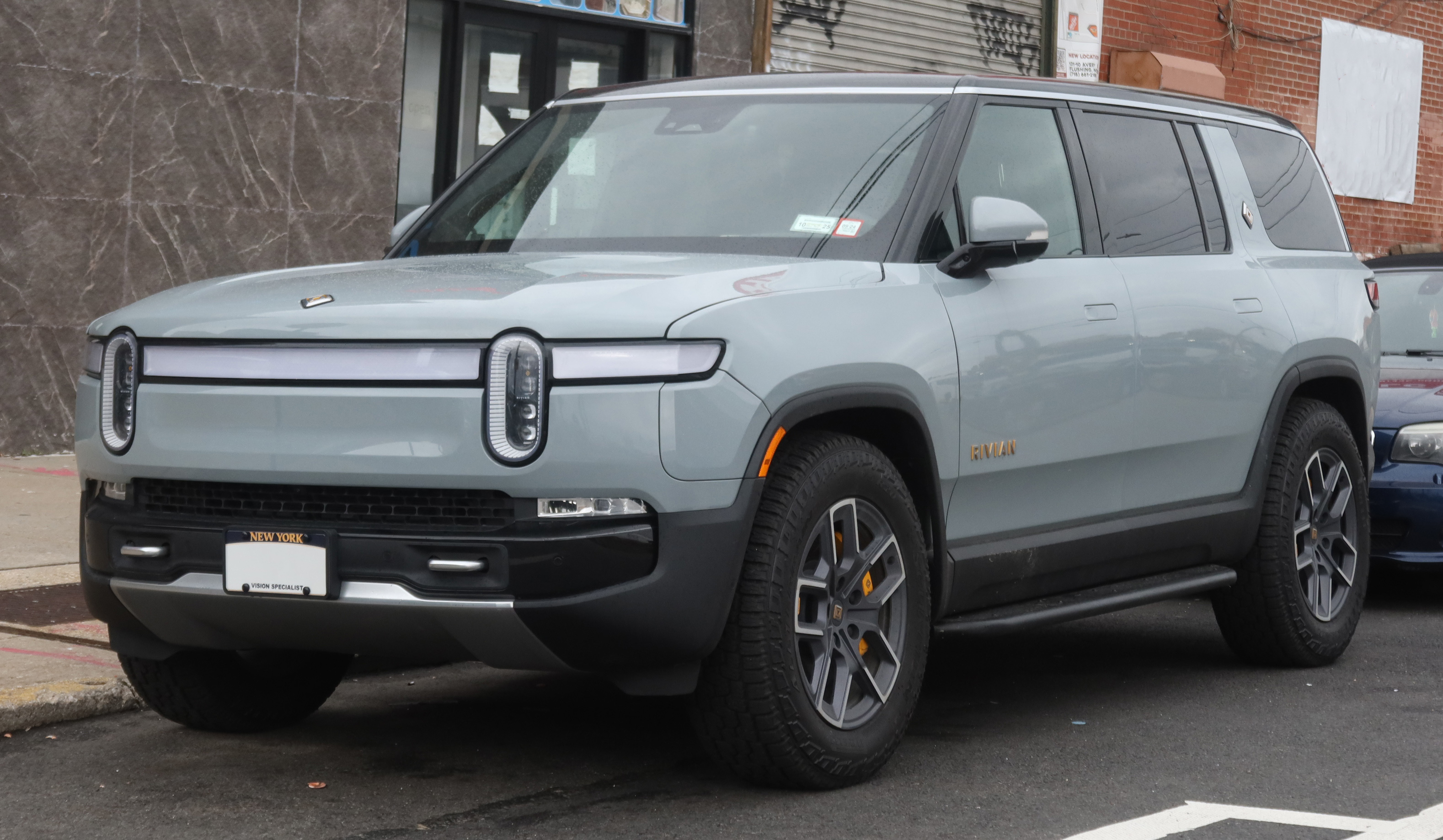

Overview
- Manufacturer: Rivian
- Production: 2022–present
- Model years: 2022–present
- Assembly: United States: Normal, Illinois
- Designer: Paul Hoste (2014)

Body and chassis
- Class: Full-size SUV
- Body style: 5-door SUV
- Doors: 4 doors + 1 in rear
- Related: Rivian R1T

Powertrain
- Power output: 402–1,025 hp (300–764 kW)
- Transmission: Single-speed
- Hybrid drivetrain: IWD 4x4
- Battery: 7,776 cells (2170 type) in a nine-module assembly for the 135 kWh liquid-cooled lithium-ion battery pack 1 cell in door torch for 7,777 cells
- Electric range: 316 miles (509 km)

Dimensions
- Wheelbase: 3,076 mm (121.1 in)
- Length: 5,100 mm (200.8 in)
- Width: 2,014 mm (79.3 in)
- Height: 1,816–1,963 mm (71.5–77.3 in)
- Curb weight: 3,206 kg (7,068 lb)

The Rivian R1S is an all-electric, seven-passenger, full-size, off-road SUV manufactured by Rivian. Customer deliveries started in 2022, after 10 years under development. Depending on the configuration, it has either two, three, or four electric motors.

== Design ==
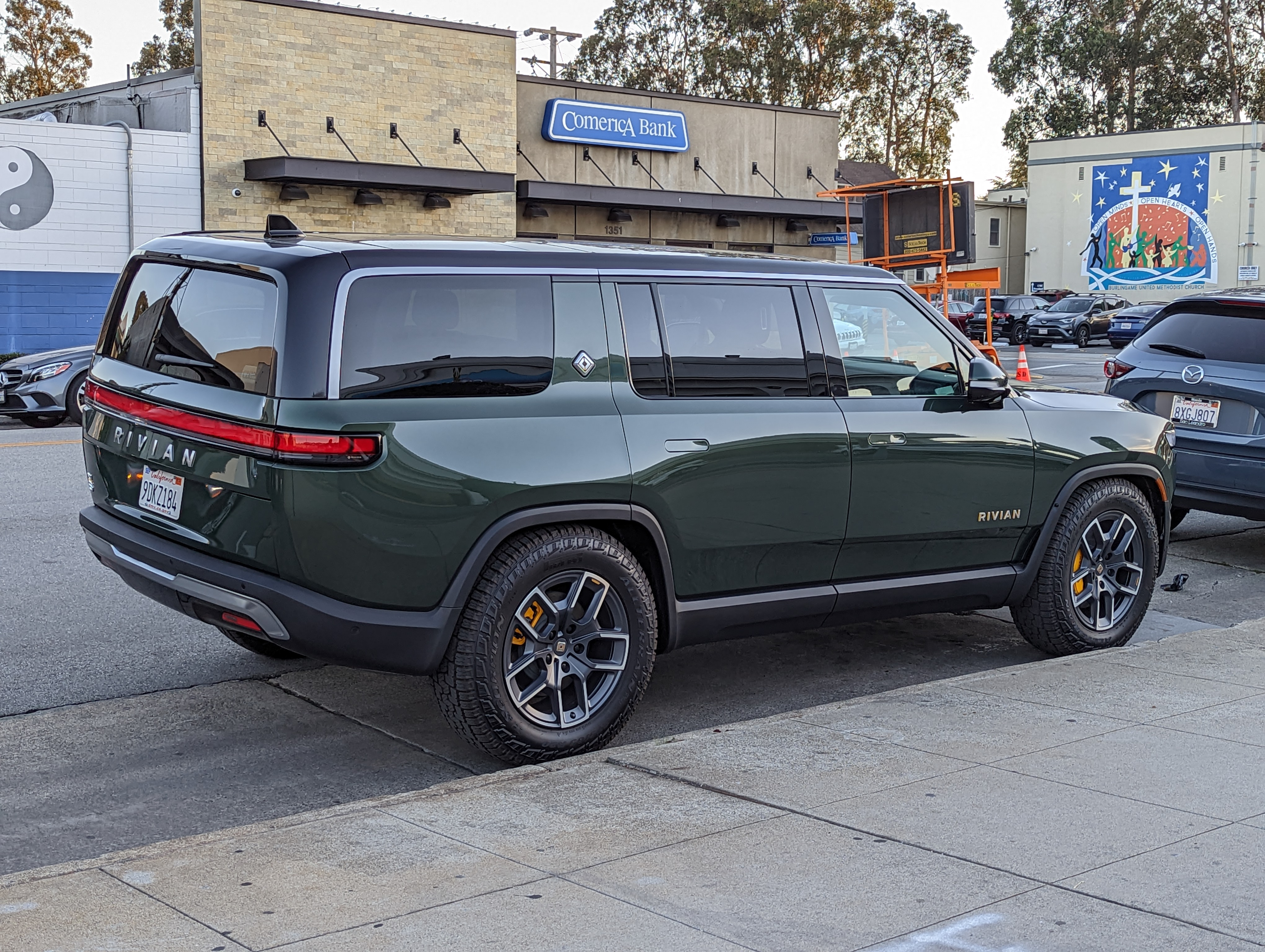
Rear view, Launch Edition

With a 0 to 60 mph (0.4 160mph) f 3 seconds, due to its 835 hp (623 kW; 847 PS) combined output power, the R1S shares 91% of its components with the company's R1T, noted for its low center of gravity. The vehicle is equipped for semi-autonomous driving according to level 3 and designed for road traffic and off-road driving.

=== Powertrain ===
As announced in 2018, the R1S was designed with three battery capacities and power outputs; all planned versions included four traction motors, in which each wheel is driven by an independent traction motor, allowing full-time all-wheel drive with torque vectoring. The quad-motor version (QM) uses electric traction motors developed by Robert Bosch GmbH, but these are carried on the vehicle's frame; the R1S does not use wheel hub motors like the Lordstown Endurance. As delivered in 2022, the QM R1S has a combined output of 835 hp (623 kW) and 908 lb⋅ft (1,231 N⋅m), split 415 / 420 hp (309 / 313 kW) and 413 / 495 lb⋅ft (560 / 671 N⋅m) front/rear.

R1S configurations
Motors Battery (kW-hr)		Dual-Motor (DM)	Performance Dual-Motor (PDM)	Quad-Motor (QM)
Motors Battery (kW-hr)		Range		
Standard	(105)	260 mi (420 km)	N/A	N/A
Large	(135)	340 mi (550 km)		321 mi (517 km)
Max	(149)	400 mi (640 km)	400 mi (640 km)	N/A
Output		533 hp (397 kW) & 610 lb⋅ft (827 N⋅m)	665 hp (496 kW) & 829 lb⋅ft (1,124 N⋅m)	835 hp (623 kW) & 908 lb⋅ft (1,231 N⋅m)

Rivian has announced plans to reduce prices by offering dual-motor (DM) versions starting in 2024, with independent traction motors for the front and rear axles, using "Enduro" motors developed by Rivian for the EDV. DM versions will be offered with two different battery capacities (standard and large) for the R1S, with slightly greater corresponding range as the weight and efficiency should improve with two motors. Maximum output of the dual-motor version is expected to be >600 hp (450 kW) and >600 lb⋅ft (810 N⋅m), which is a decrease from the quad-motor version; a "Performance Dual Motor" (PDM) option was added in April 2023, which raises output to approximately 700 hp (520 kW) through a software modification. Production of the "Enduro" motor drive units began in February 2023; most have been used to ramp up EDV production, but DM R1S SUVs with the Large battery pack were first delivered to customers in May 2023.

The extended range ("Max Pack") battery has been delayed until 2023. In addition, the smaller ("Standard") battery is not scheduled to be delivered until 2024; the Standard battery will use lithium iron phosphate (LFP) chemistry to reduce costs by eliminating nickel and cobalt.

=== Consumption and performance ===
The 2022 Rivian R1S was rated by the EPA with a consumption of 69 mpg‑e (49 kW⋅h/100 mi) for the combined city+highway driving cycle and a total range of 316 mi (509 km) when equipped with the "Large" 135 kWh battery and quad-motor drivetrain.

Acceleration from 0 to 60 mph (97 km/h) was tested by Motor Trend in August 2022 at 3.1 seconds on all-season tires and 3.2 seconds on all-terrain tires. Corresponding 1/4 mi (0.40 km) elapsed times and trap speeds were 11.6 sec at 111.2 mph (179.0 km/h) on all-season tires, slowing to 11.8 sec at 111.6 mph (179.6 km/h) with all-terrain tires.

=== Storage and towing ===
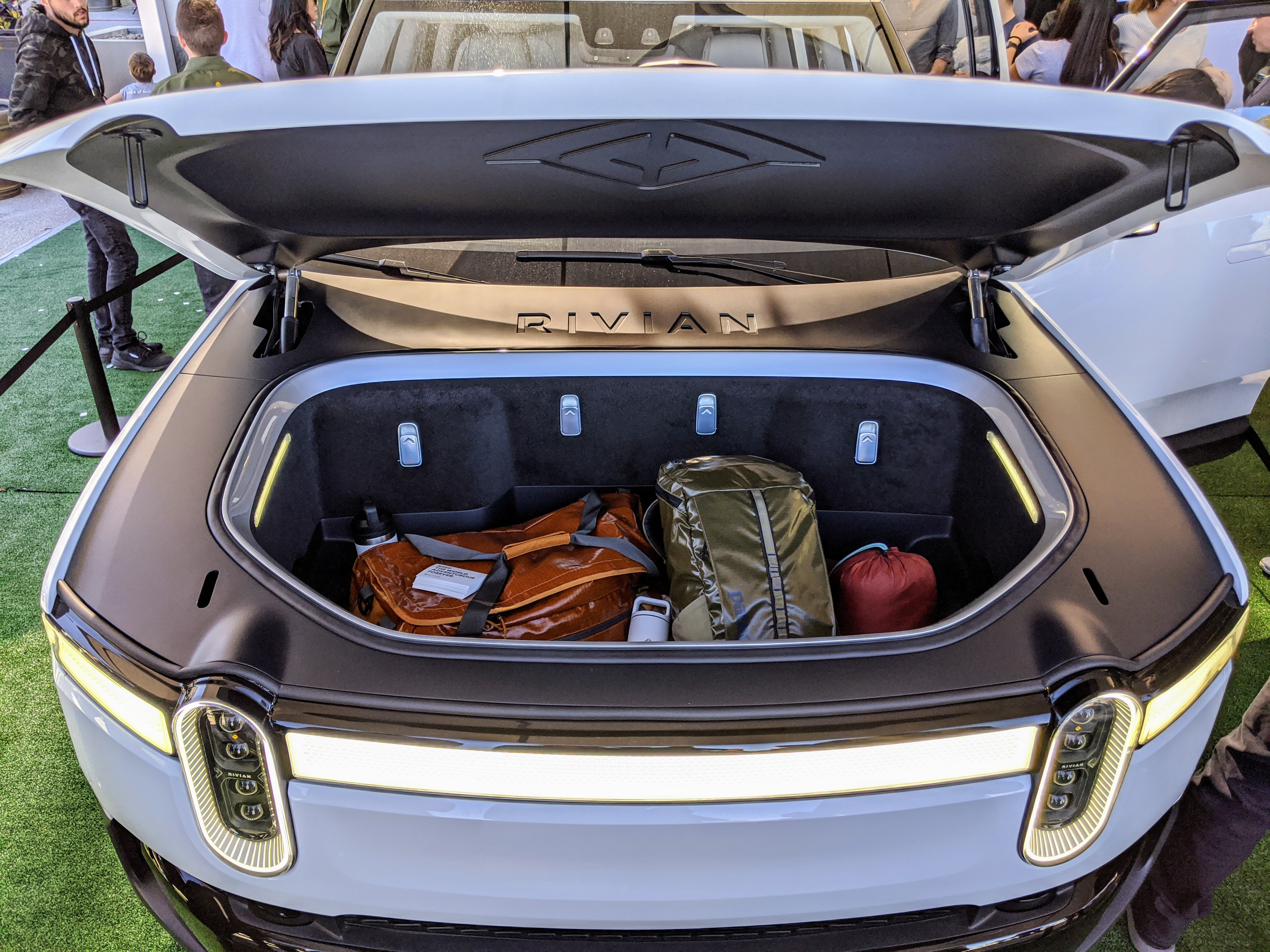
The frunk of a Rivian R1S

Total enclosed cargo volume is 104.7 cu ft (2.96 m^{3}) when the second and third rows of seats are folded down. A "frunk" under the hood, where the engine is in most conventional internal combustion engine vehicles, adds 11.1 cu ft (0.31 m^{3}) of lockable storage. In addition, there is a small compartment underneath the cargo floor.

Towing capacity is 7,700 lb (3,500 kg).

=== Interior ===
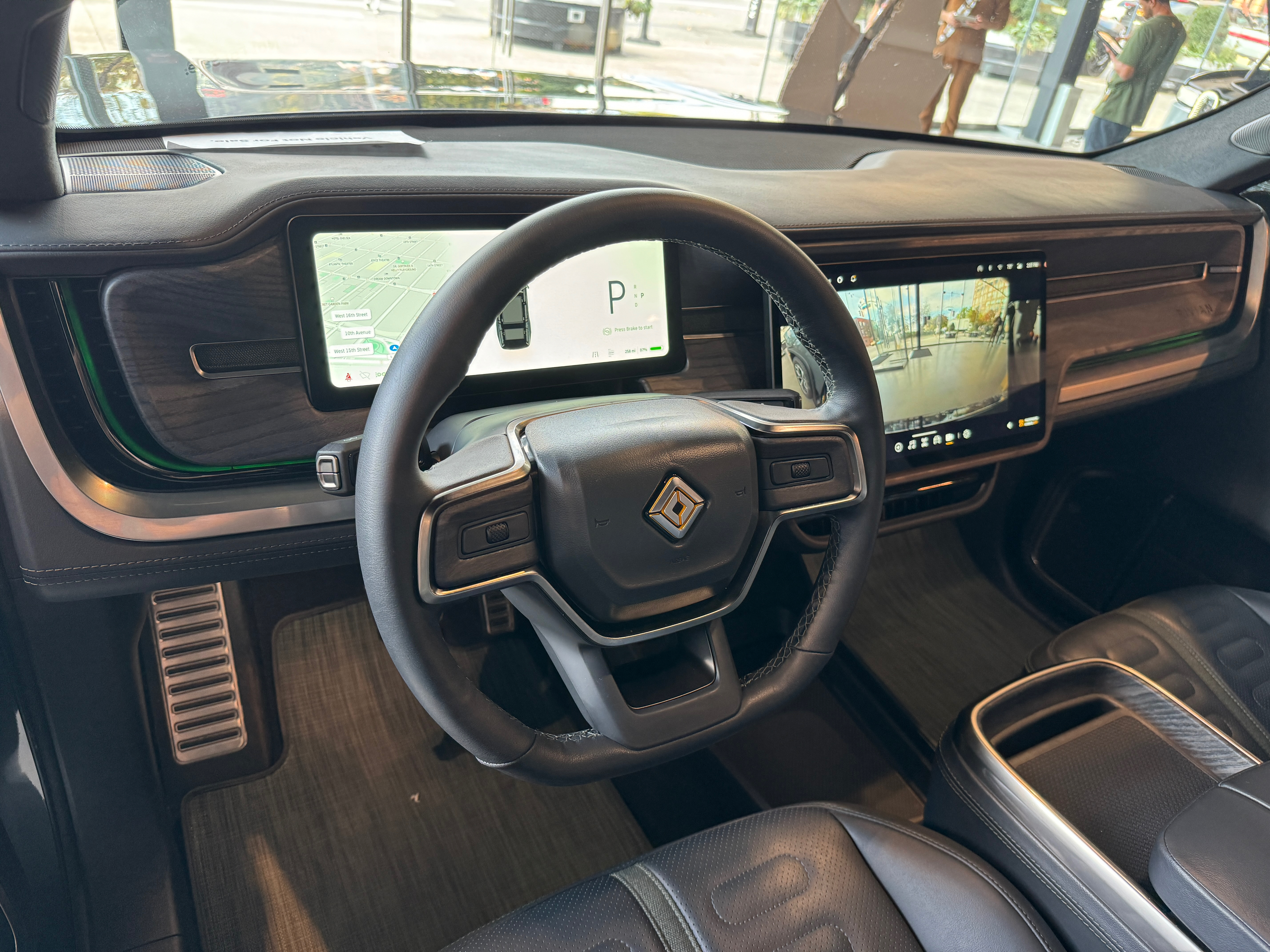
Interior

Pet comfort mode maintains a user-selected temperature inside the car when the driver is away from the vehicle. A five-passenger option deleting the third row was discontinued in March 2022 before production vehicles began to be delivered; all R1Ss are seven-passenger, three-row vehicles. Third-row seating was reported to be "a little tight for adults", with low cushion height resulting in most people adopting a posture with knees higher than their hips.

In their review, Motor Trend reported that the glass roof was not equipped with a sunshade and the resulting insolation made its reviewers uncomfortable during comparison testing in the desert at temperatures exceeding 100 °F (38 °C). They also criticized the infotainment system, which is not equipped with Apple CarPlay or Android Auto.

=== Chassis ===
The vehicle has an air suspension which allows for a maximum ground clearance of 14.9 in (380 mm), with individual wheels cross-linked to reduce body lean during cornering. In addition, there is a "Camp Mode" that allows the vehicle to level itself when parked on irregular terrain. Maximum wading depth in water is 43.1 in (1.09 m).

Compared to the R1T, which has a 135.8 in (3,450 mm) wheelbase, the R1S rides on a shorter 121.1 in (3,080 mm) wheelbase and has a shorter rear overhang, improving departure and breakover angles. This also results in a turning circle that is nearly 4 ft (1.2 m) smaller for the R1S.

=== Trim levels ===
The entry-level trim was called the Explore package, which included matte-black interior finishes and heated vegan leather seats. In August 2022, Rivian announced it had discontinued the Explore package citing low demand, simplified assembly and supply chain constraints that would be alleviated with a single option. By eliminating the base trim, Rivian effectively increased prices.

The Adventure package upgrades the interior with heated and cooled perforated vegan leather seats, Chilewich woven floor mats, wood or vegan leather accents, and a premium Rivian Elevation sound system designed by Meridian Audio which includes a removable Bluetooth speaker.

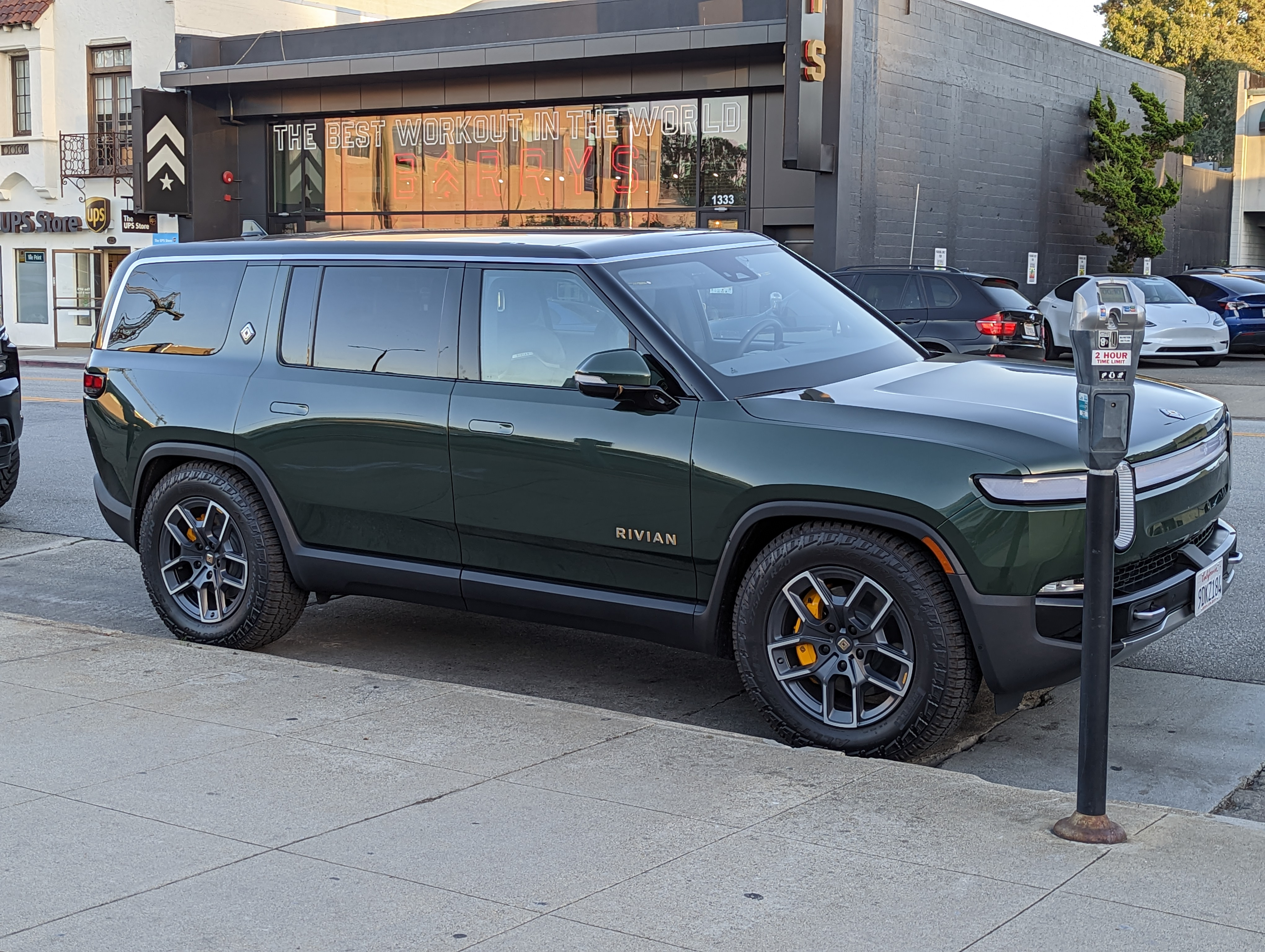
R1S Launch edition

The limited-availability Launch edition included the Adventure package, the large battery, an exclusive Launch green color, and an option to upgrade wheels and tires at no additional cost.

== History ==
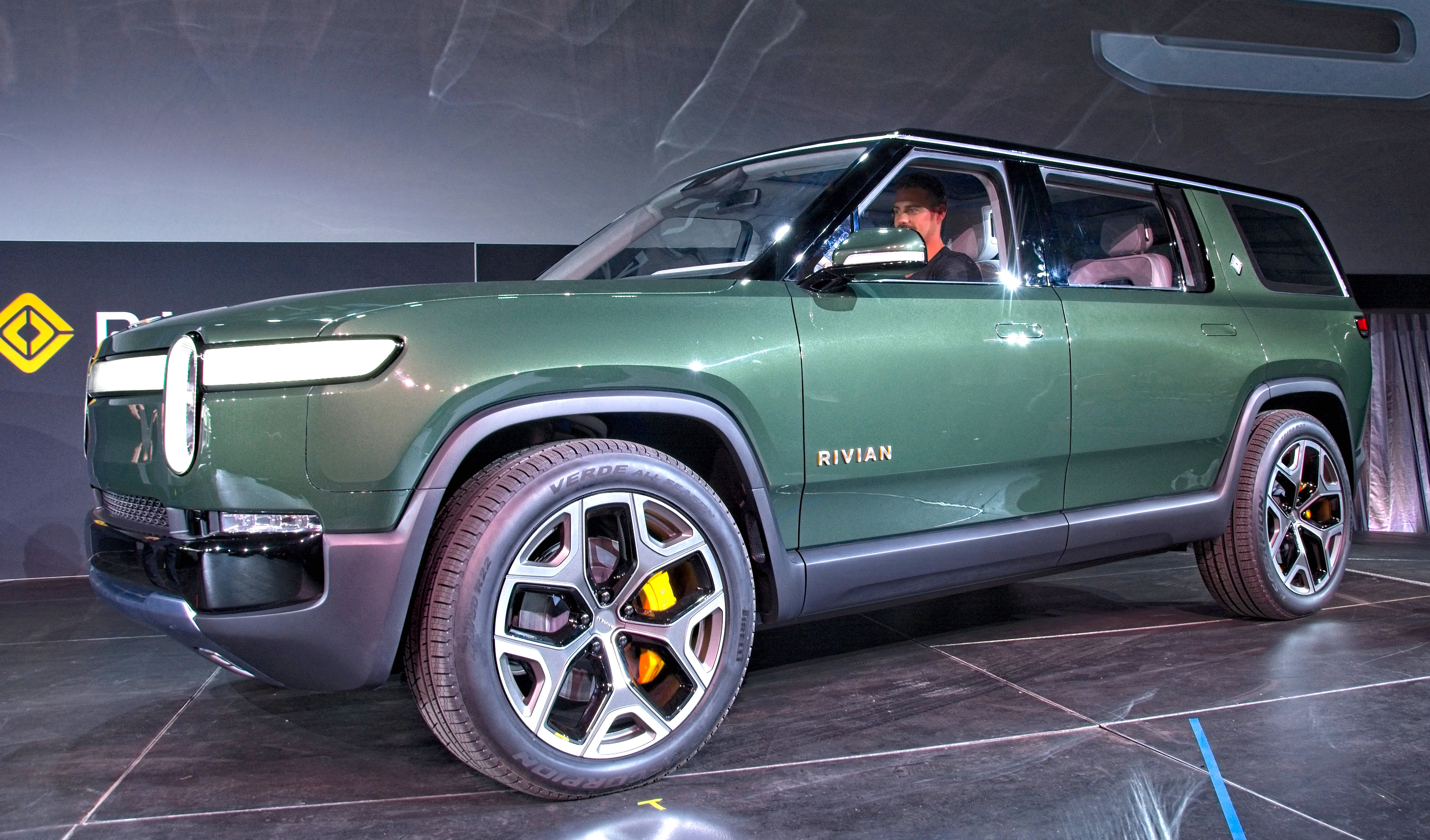
Concept Rivian R1S at the Nov 2018 LA Auto Show

The Rivian R1S debuted as a prototype model first shown at the Los Angeles Auto Show in November 2018. The prototype shown in LA was said to be in "production form". By December 2019, Rivian had raised $1.3 billion in new funding for this and the R1T Truck.

=== Delivery delays ===
The first two R1S vehicles were delivered to the CEO, R.J. Scaringe, and the CFO, Claire McDonough, in December 2021. Rivian announced in mid-June 2022 that there would be a delay for some deliveries of its R1S electric SUV. The company cited the delay was due to supply chain issues and limited service infrastructure. Deliveries to customers began in late August 2022. The first vehicles to be released were equipped with the large (135 kWh) battery and quad-motor drivetrain.

=== Price changes ===
In March 2022, Rivian announced the price of the R1S would increase by 20%, jumping to $84,500 from $70,000 for the base model. After receiving negative feedback, Rivian honored the original prices for pre-orders made before the price increase. In August 2022, Rivian cancelled the base Explore trim level, forcing people who pre-ordered the Explore to either cancel or upgrade to the more expensive Adventure trim.

== Awards ==
- R1S SUV as an IIHS TOP SAFETY PICK+ for the 2023 model year.
- 2024 Rivian Earns Most-Loved Brand Title from Consumer Reports

== Sales ==
Calendar year	U.S.
2022	800
2023	23,437
2024	19,712
2025	23,991
