= Rivian EDV =

Electric delivery van

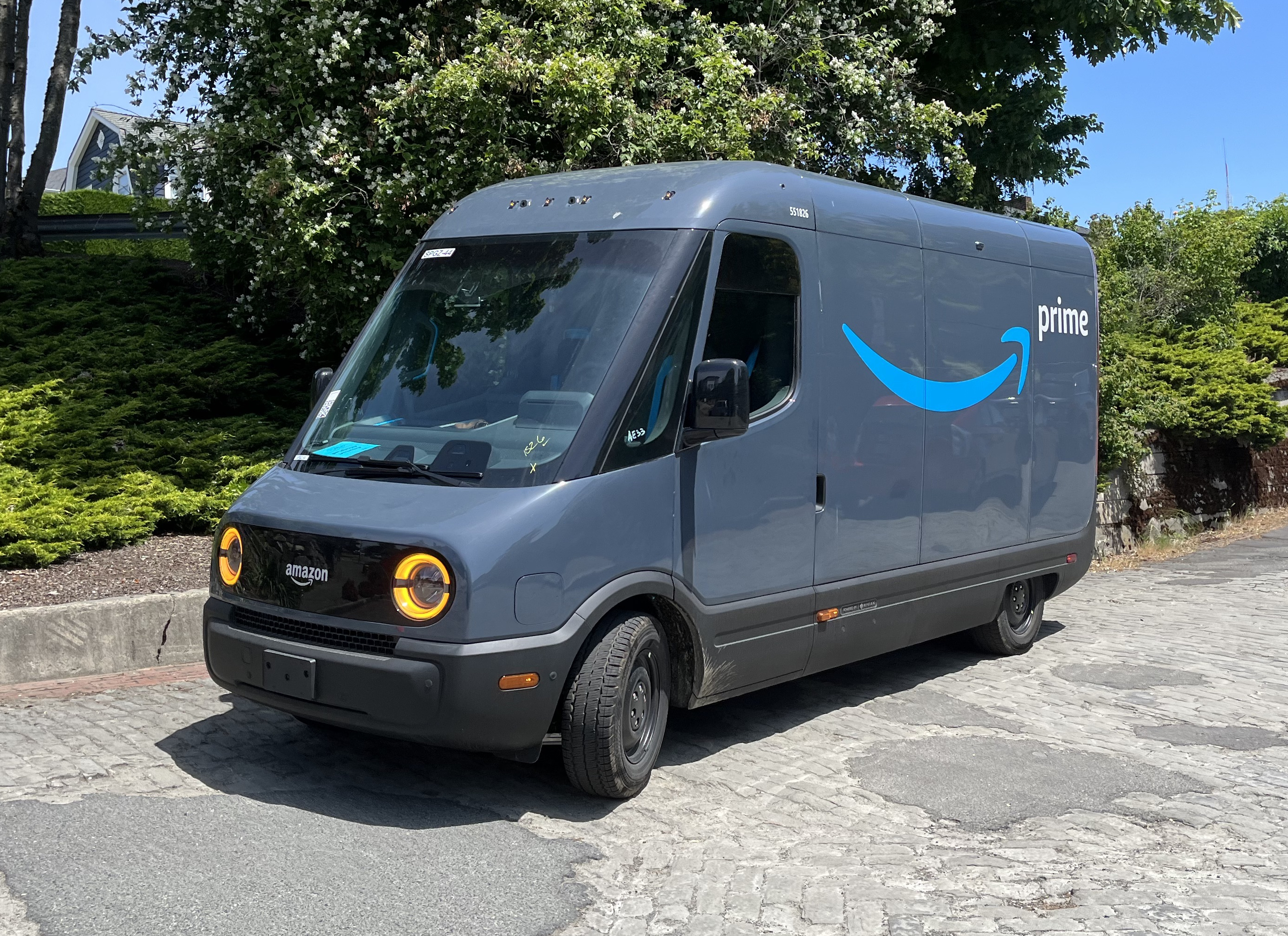
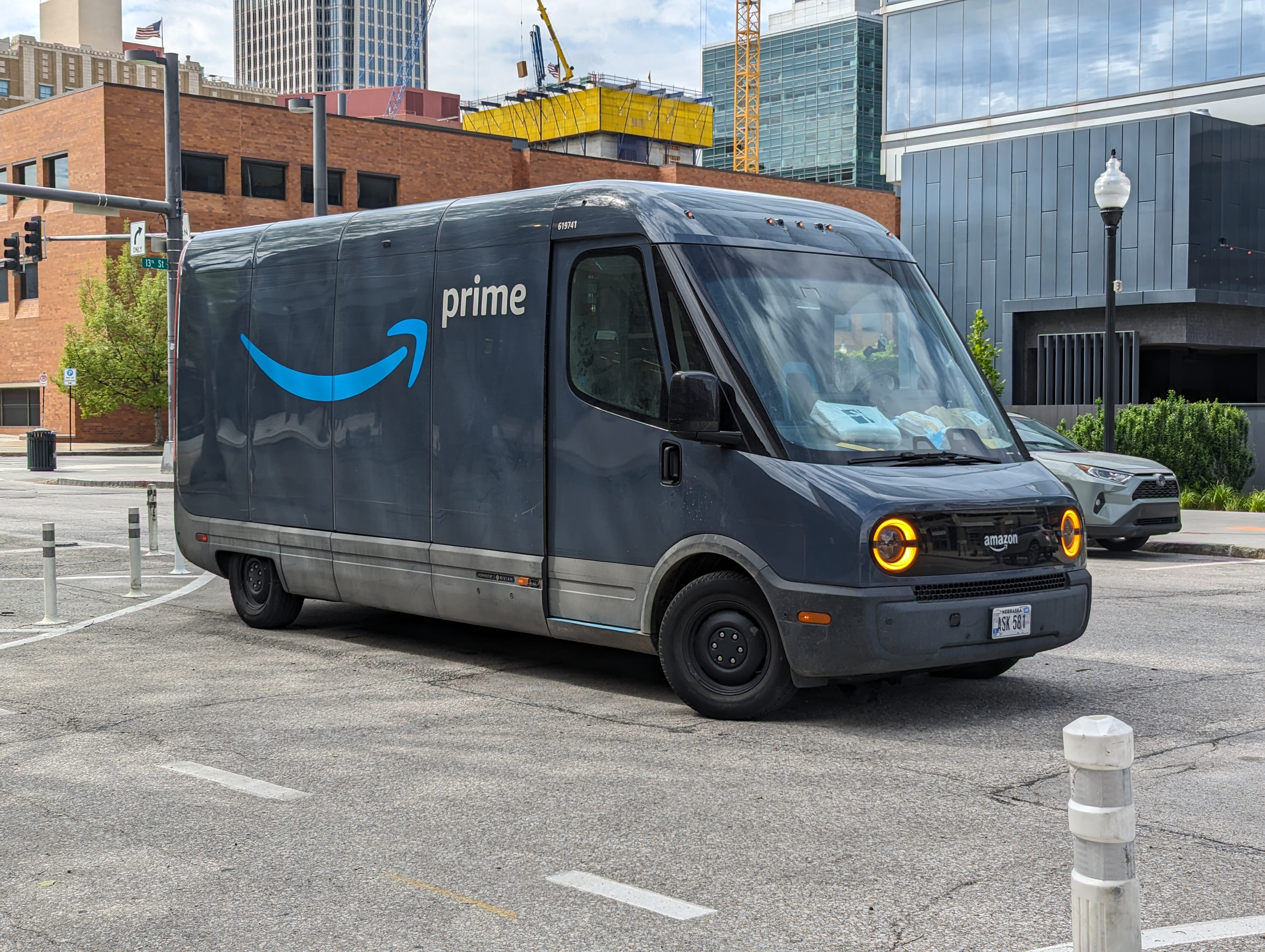
- Rivian EDV-500 (top) and EDV-700 (bottom)

Overview
- Manufacturer: Rivian
- Also called: Rivian ECV
- Production: 2021–present
- Assembly: United States: Normal, Illinois
- Designer: Jeff Hammoud

Body and chassis
- Body style: 2-door panel van
- Layout: FWD or AWD
- Platform: Rivian RCV
- Related: Rivian R1S; Rivian R1T

Powertrain
- Propulsion: battery-electric

Dimensions
- Wheelbase: 3,988–5,207 mm (157–205 in)
- Length: 6,299–8,153 mm (248–321 in)

The Rivian EDV (Electric Delivery Van) and ECV (Electric Commercial Van), also known as the Delivery, are a line of battery-electric cargo vehicles built by Rivian. Initially they were exclusive to its investor Amazon, which uses the EDV for package delivery, but in November 2023, sales were opened to other companies as the ECV / Delivery, with minor cosmetic changes. The EDV and ECV use the RCV (Rivian Commercial Vehicle) platform, which is derived from the R1 platform that underpins the manufacturer's R1T pickup truck and R1S sport-utility vehicles, and is built in three sizes. Specific models (ordered by increasing size) include the EDV/ECV-500/Delivery 500, EDV/ECV-700/Delivery 700, and EDV-900.

== History ==
In February 2019, Amazon announced it was leading a $700 million investment in Rivian. That September, Amazon Logistics ordered 100,000 battery electric delivery vehicles as part of a collaborative design effort between Rivian and Amazon. Initial schedules stated the first vans would be delivered to Amazon in 2021, with as many as 10,000 electric vans in operation by 2022, and the full order to be fulfilled by 2024. However, that date was later revised to 2030. The Rivian collaboration is part of Amazon's plan to convert its delivery fleet to 100% renewable energy by 2030. Amazon also will source electric vans and three-wheelers from other OEMs, such as Stellantis, Mercedes-Benz Group, and Mahindra.

By February 2020, Rivian had shown a full-size clay model of the van. A prototype Amazon electric delivery van with 150-mile (240 km) range was tested on public roads in early 2021, starting in Los Angeles and San Francisco. By April 2021, testing had expanded to Denver with additional plans to test in sixteen more U.S. cities in different climate zones. Tests in Oklahoma and Michigan were underway by July 2021. The first production EDV, an EDV-700, was completed in December 2021 and delivered to Amazon.

Deployment of the electric delivery vans began in nine U.S. cities in July 2022. By November, Amazon stated it had more than 1,000 EDVs in operation which had delivered a collective 5 million packages. In July 2023, one year after Amazon began receiving the vans, more than 5,000 had been delivered, and the first deliveries to Germany had begun. By October, that had doubled to 10,000 vans.

Under the initial agreement, Amazon had exclusive rights to purchase the EDV for four years after the first batch was delivered, and the right of first refusal over any other companies seeking to purchase the EDV from Rivian for two additional years after that. Exclusivity is contingent on Amazon ordering 10,000 vans for each of the first two years of production, and if Amazon does not order 100,000 vans in total, the exclusivity arrangement is terminated. After Amazon placed a minimum order for 10,000 EDVs in 2023, Rivian entered negotiations to terminate the exclusivity agreement.

Rivian listed the Delivery 500 and 700 on their website for other companies to purchase, starting in November 2023, prioritizing deliveries to larger fleets, scheduled to start in 2024; smaller fleets and individual vehicles are likely to start being delivered in 2025. The Delivery features the Rivian logo on the front instead of the Amazon logo. From March 25 to April 26, 2024, the United States Postal Service evaluated a Delivery 500 vehicle at the Vienna Post Office in Vienna, Virginia, as a potential commercial off-the-shelf vehicle for postal carriers.

Rivian provided over 15,000 EDV vehicles to Amazon as of July 2024. By the end of 2025, Rivian had delivered 30,000 vans to Amazon. Rivian is developing new variants of the EDV, with an AWD variant that operates better in snow and ice, and one with a larger battery pack that provides 30% extra range.

== Specifications ==
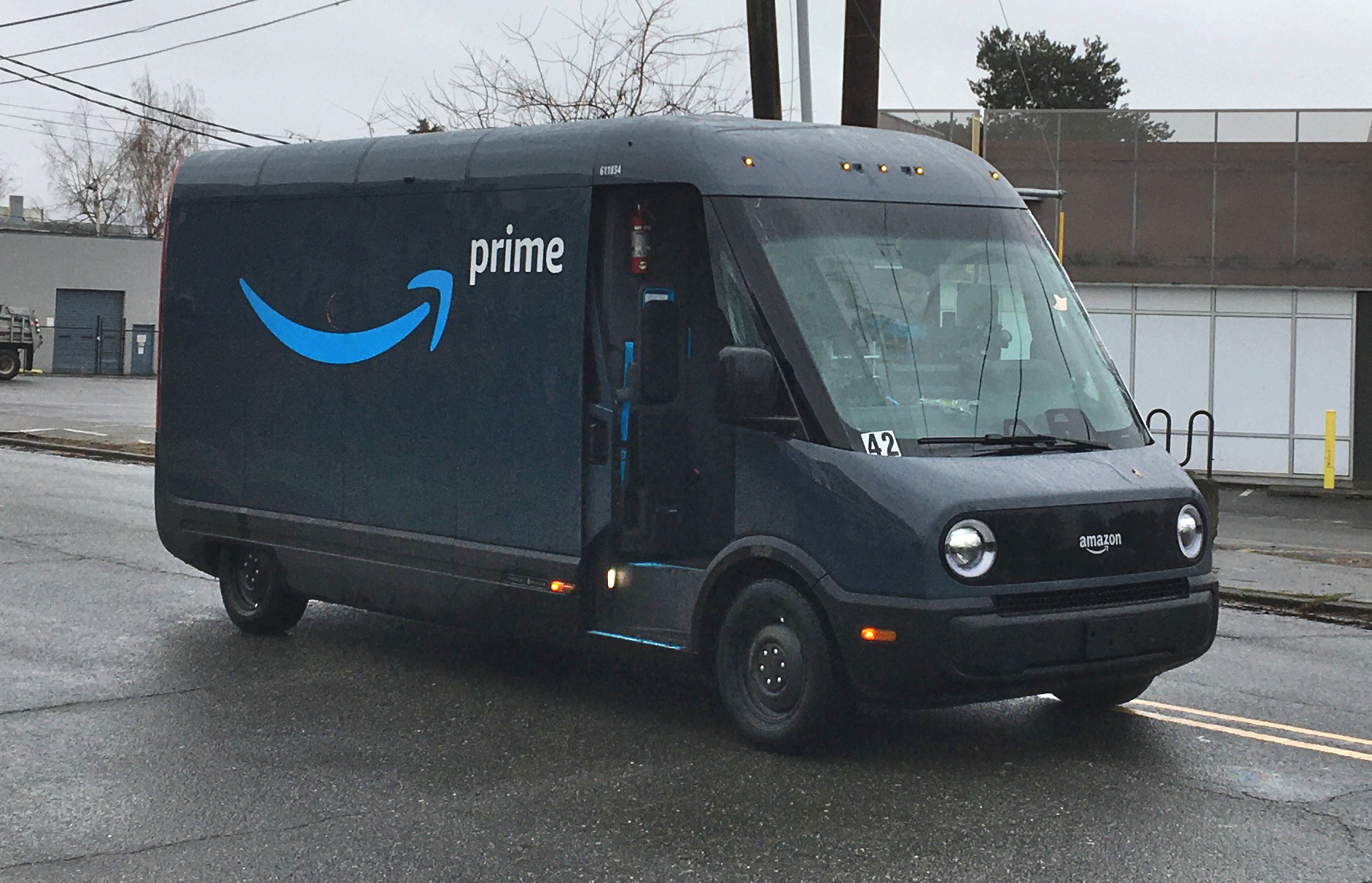
Rivian EDV-700

Rivian EDV/ECV summary
Model Parameter		ECV-500	EDV-500	ECV-700	EDV-700	EDV-900
Range		161 mi (259 km)	<150 mi (240 km)	153 mi (246 km)	<150 mi (240 km)	<120 mi (190 km)
Exterior	Wheelbase	157.5 in (4,000 mm)		187.0 in (4,750 mm)		205 in (5,200 mm)
Exterior	Length	248.5 in (6,310 mm)		278.0 in (7,060 mm)		321 in (8,200 mm)
Exterior	Height	115 in (2,900 mm)				?
Exterior	Width (incl. mirrors)	96.4 in (2,450 mm)		103.5 in (2,630 mm)		?
Weight	Curb	6,616 lb (3,001 kg)	?	6,986 lb (3,169 kg)	?	?
Weight	GVWR	9,350 lb (4,240 kg)		9,500 lb (4,300 kg)	9,350 lb (4,240 kg)	14,000 lb (6,400 kg)
Cargo	Volume	487 ft^{3} (13.8 m^{3})	500 ft^{3} (14 m^{3})	652 ft^{3} (18.5 m^{3})	660 ft^{3} (19 m^{3})	840 ft^{3} (24 m^{3})
Cargo	Length	137.3 in (3,490 mm)	?	166.8 in (4,240 mm)	?	?
Cargo	Width (wall-to-wall, min)	70.4 in (1,790 mm)	?	77.4 in (1,970 mm)	?	?
Cargo	Height (min)	79.8 in (2,030 mm)				
Cargo	Payload	2,734 lb (1,240 kg)		2,513 lb (1,140 kg)		?

The van is built in three sizes, with nominal storage capacities of 500, 700, or 900 ft^{3} (14, 20, or 25 m^{3}). Each size shares the same stand-up interior height, but the smallest -500 model is narrower than the others. All of the vans are built on the same platform—basic electrical and network architecture, ECUs, and battery-pack design—as the Rivian R1 models, and use a basic single-motor e-axle drive unit. The van is built with a steel chassis on a "low-feature-content" assembly line to keep costs down. The van is explicitly designed to allow Amazon to reduce costs and shrink its carbon footprint.

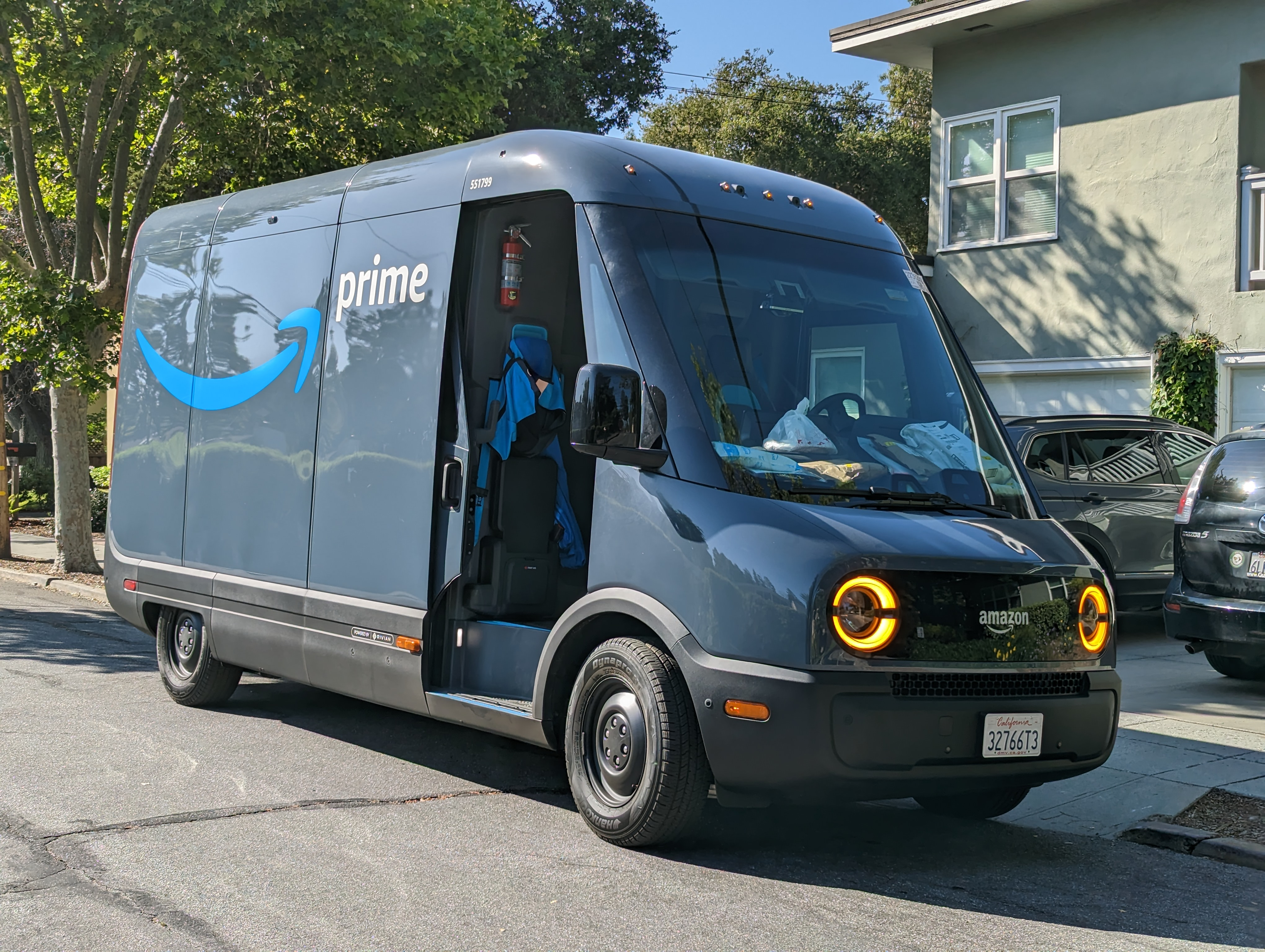
Rivian EDV-500, photographed in Menlo Park, California

Because the EDV-500 is used in Europe, it is 7 in (180 mm) narrower than the -700, and the -500 also is available in a right-hand drive version. Externally, the different sizes can be distinguished by counting the number of "segments" behind the side doors: the EDV-500 has three, the -700 has four, and the -900 has five.

=== Chassis ===
The RCV platform uses a typical electric vehicle skateboard-type chassis with double wishbone front suspension and a twist beam trailing arm rear suspension on a steel ladder frame. The coil-sprung rear axle uses a track bar for lateral support, while the front suspension uses a transverse composite leaf spring. Payload capacity ranges from 1,960 to 2,750 lb (890 to 1,250 kg).

=== Traction motors ===
According to a vehicle identification number encoding document that Rivian filed with the NHTSA, there would have been three drivetrain options: front-wheel drive using one or two traction motors, or all-wheel drive with two motors. However, Rivian does not plan to produce the AWD model with two traction motors.

The first EDV-700s have a dual-motor front-wheel drive arrangement, using motors sourced from Robert Bosch GmbH. The output has been detuned from the comparable front axle unit fitted to the R1T and R1S.

In the first quarter of 2023, Rivian transitioned to using a single "Enduro" motor on the front axle, developed in-house. The "Enduro" motor was developed to reduce costs and alleviate a production bottleneck due to a shortage of power semiconductors used in the Bosch-sourced traction motors; Enduro motors will be shared with dual-motor powertrain variants of the R1T and R1S. Production of the Enduro drive units began in February 2023.

For the RCV, the single-motor model has a maximum rated output of 320 hp (240 kW) and 299 lb⋅ft (405 N⋅m).

=== Battery ===
The high-voltage traction battery is carried beneath the body floor. Initially, only one traction battery size would be manufactured, with the same 135 kW-hr capacity and composition as the "Large" battery for R1T and R1S vehicles, using Samsung NCA battery chemistry in 2170-sized cylindrical cells. However, Rivian announced they plan to migrate commercial vehicle batteries to a lithium iron phosphate chemistry, sized to meet a target range of 150 mi (240 km), and completed the migration to LFP batteries in the first quarter of 2023, simultaneous with the switch to the single Enduro motor.

The model which contains the largest cargo volume, the EDV-900, also contains the smallest battery. As these trucks deliver bulky yet relatively light packages, these vans mostly operate in dense neighborhoods, which do not require a very long range. The tested range with the NCA battery and dual-motor front-drive is 201 mi (323 km) under the EPA driving cycle, but for the vans delivered to Amazon, the range is limited by software to 150 mi (240 km).

The vehicle supports DC fast charging speeds of up to 100 kW, although initial models were limited to 50 kW. An on-board charger is capable of accepting AC power at a maximum speed of 11 kW, intended for overnight charging. Regenerative braking is standard on all models.

=== Safety ===
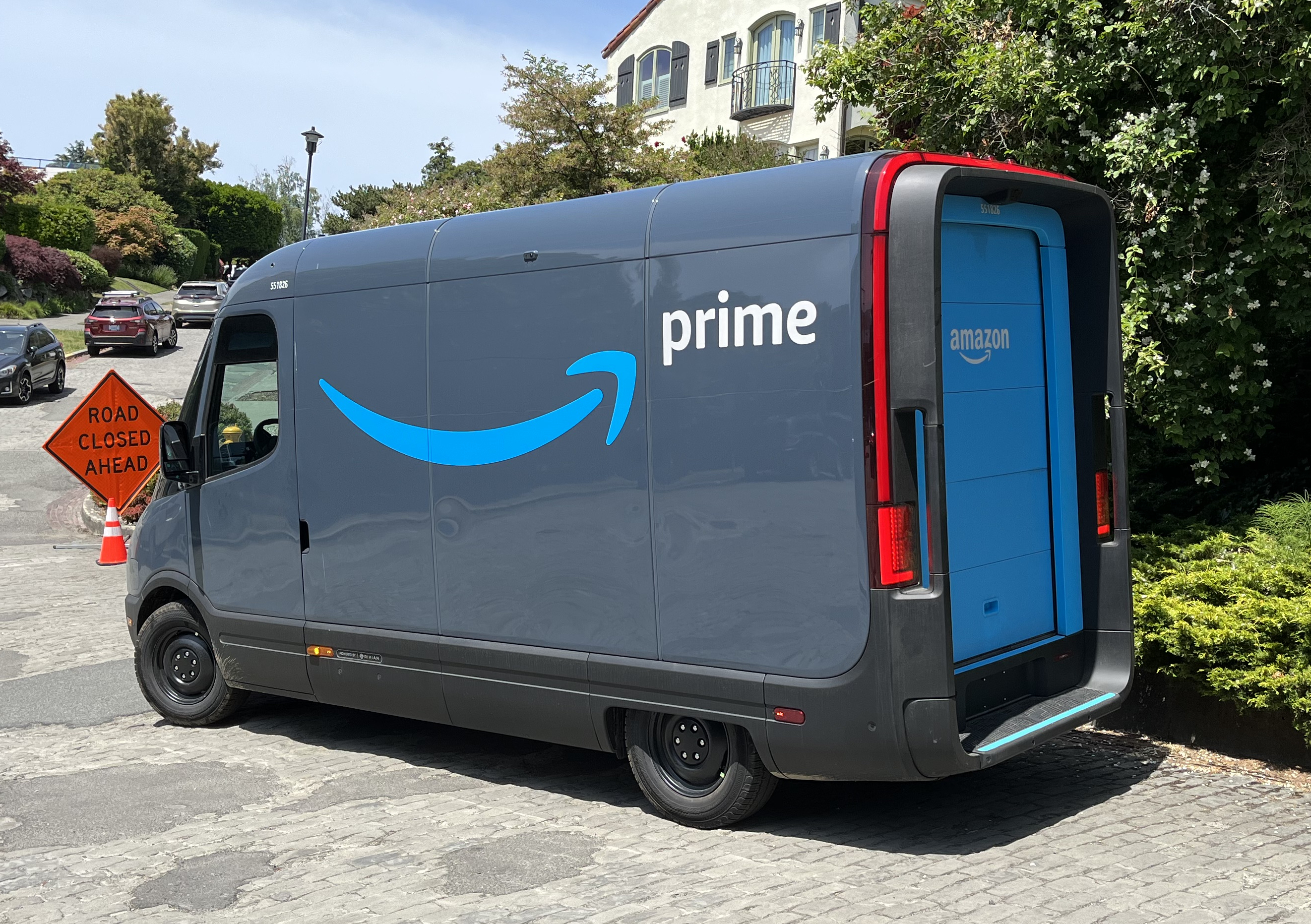
Rivian EDV-500, rear view

To aid the driver's vision, the van is equipped with an enlarged windshield and stitched exterior cameras that are used to display a view of the entire surroundings. For visibility to other motorists, the rear sides and roof of the van are outlined with a large red taillight. Warning noises were developed through testing in Seattle that ensured the vans would be audible to pedestrians outdoors but not people inside buildings. The EDV also is equipped with radar which along with the cameras enables advanced driver-assistance systems including forward collision warning, automatic emergency braking, and lane-keeping assistance.

The curb-side door is a sliding door, while the street-side door for the driver is a conventional forward-hinged door, which provides better side impact resistance. The rear cargo area is accessed either through an exterior roll-up door or an interior sliding door separating the cargo area from the driver's compartment; input from Amazon delivery partners resulted in non-slip steps integrated into the rear bumper and handgrips to aid access.

=== Styling ===
The front of the vehicle was deliberately styled to be friendly and appealing, featuring circular headlights surrounded by semi-circular rings that act as daytime running lights or turn indicators; Automotive journalist Jason Torchinsky wrote the EDV "looks friendly and eager, like a whale who's here to help."

The EDV/ECV is equipped with large touchscreens and navigation software to aid the driver on their route.
