= RT =

RT may refer to:

== Arts and media ==
- RT (TV network), a Russian television news channel (formerly Russia Today)
  - RT America, defunct U.S. channel (2010–2022)
  - RT UK, defunct British channel (2014–2022)
  - RT France, defunct French channel (2014–2022)
  - RT Arabic, Arabic-language channel
  - RT Spanish, Spanish-language channel
  - RT Documentary, RT's documentary channel
- RT!, Canadian music-video director
- Radio Times, a British listings magazine
- Radio Thailand, a Thai public radio station
- Rooster Teeth, an entertainment production company
- Rotten Tomatoes, a review aggregator website

== Science and technology ==
=== Biology and medicine ===
- Radiation therapy or radiotherapy
- Rapid test
- Reaction time, a term used in psychology
- Respiratory therapist
- Resuscitative thoracotomy
- Reverse transcriptase, an enzyme that transcribes RNA to DNA
- Richter's transformation, in chronic leukemia
- $R_t$ or effective reproduction number, a measure of the spread of an infection in epidemiology

=== Computing and telecommunications ===
- IBM RT PC, a computer
- Windows RT, for ARM processors
- Radiotechnique, a French electronics manufacturer
- Radiotelephone
- Request Tracker, a ticketing system
- Retweeting, a sharing function on Twitter
- RT-Mobile, spun off from Rostelecom in Russia

=== Other uses in science and technology ===
- RT (energy), the product of the gas constant (R) and temperature
- Relevance theory, a linguistic framework for understanding utterance interpretation
- RT-2, a vision-language-action model developed by Google DeepMind in July 2023

== Sports ==
- Russian Time, a Russian motor racing team
- Right tackle, in American and Canadian football

== Transportation ==
- R/T (Road/Track), a Dodge car performance designator
- AEC Regent III RT, London Transport bus, 1938–1979
- Rapid transit
  - Line 3 Scarborough of the Toronto Subway, Scarborough RT or "The RT"
- Sacramento Regional Transit District, SacRT or RT
- Route number in the US
- UVT Aero, an airline (IATA code RT)

== Other uses ==
- Lil RT (born 2014), American rapper
- Ruby Tuesday (restaurant) (NYSE symbol), a restaurant chain
- Rukun tetangga, an administrative division of Indonesia

== See also ==
- Real-time (disambiguation)
- The Right Honourable, abbreviated "Rt Hon."
- Arty (disambiguation)
- RT1 (disambiguation)
