= Artie Diamond =

American boxer (1929–1976)

Artie Diamond (born abt 1929– February 1976) was a Jewish-American welterweight and middleweight boxer who fought professionally from 1949 to 1951. Diamond turned pro in 1949 when he was 20 and fought for a little over a year before retiring in 1951 with a 24–9 record. After retiring, he got in trouble with the law and was sentenced to 7.5–15 years for armed robbery. After he got out, he worked for a time as an assistant trainer to José Torres before he was jailed again. Diamond later worked as a security guard and was killed when he and a night club owner were shot by a stranger.

== Boxing career ==
Diamond served in the Navy before moving to New York City where he was trained by Cus D'Amato, who later trained Floyd Patterson, José Torres, and Mike Tyson. As an amateur, Diamond fought 20 fights, winning 18 (15 by knock out).

Diamond turned pro in 1949. His boxing record was W24(16KO) and L9(4KO) and DRAW-0. He boxed 150 rounds and finished with a 48.48 KO%. He was known for never ducking a punch. In fact, D'Amato was so concerned that Diamond took too many punches that Diamond was forced to retire in 1951.

== Later life ==
Later that year, Diamond and some friends decided to rob an armoured truck. Diamond was sentenced to 7.5–15 years and spent time in Clinton Correctional Facility in New York for shooting a guard during the robbery. His first day in Clinton, he beat up all the boss heads including one fight where he bit off another inmate's ear. He got a month in solitary confinement for biting another inmate's ear.

After almost 8 years, Diamond was paroled and got a job as assistant trainer for conditioning for Jose Torres. However, Diamond got in trouble again for planning a payroll robbery. Diamond was sent to Green Haven prison where he was jumped by four inmates and was unconscious for several days. After his release, he got a job as head of security for a night club.

== Death ==
Diamond and his boss were shot by a stranger. He died aged 46 at Bellevue Hospital in New York City. Predeceased by his first wife Catherine, Artie was survived by his second wife and a daughter, Debbie.

Diamond was featured in Inside Sports in February 1982 in a 5-page article titled "Artie Diamond: The Toughest SOB Who Ever Lived".

== Bouts ==
Date	Weight (lb)	Opponent	Weight (lb)	Record	Venue	Result	notes
28 December 1951	158¼	Jimmy Herring	158	45-9-2	Madison Square Garden	L TKO	Diamond was down in the 3rd, the bout was stopped by the ring doctor after he felt Diamond had taken a severe beating.
7 December 1951	158¾	Jimmy Herring	159	44-9-2	Madison Square Garden	L points	
17 November 1951	161	Bob Stecher	160	40-8-1	Ridgewood Grove	W TKO	
16 May 1951	161	Jimmy Herring	157½	41-7-2	St. Nicholas Arena	L points	This was the main event. 1,497 were in attendance.
23 March 1951	159	Aldo Minelli	153	25-22-2	Madison Square Garden	L points	
23 February 1951	159½	Rocky Compitello	153¼	16-4-0	Madison Square Garden	W TKO	
27 December 1950	160	Jimmy Flood	162½	38-2-2	St. Nicholas Arena	L TKO	Diamond was ahead on points in a vicious slugging match, when the fight was stopped in round 8 because of a bad cut over Diamond's right eye.
2 November 1950	158	Tommy Bazzano	153½	35-27-6	Eastern Parkway Arena	L TKO	
21 October 1950	159	Armando Amanini	156¾	7-13-1	Ridgewood Grove	W KO	
22 September 1950	158¾	Sonny Levitt	157½	26-8-3	Madison Square Garden,	W TKO	
31 August 1950	157¾	Johnny Noel	156	7-4-0	Dexter Park Arena	W SD	
21 August 1950	155¾	Tommy Ciarlo	146½	30-24-4	Coney Island Velodrome	W UD	
7 August 1950	155	Sammy LaRotta	153	14-5-1	Coney Island Velodrome	W UD	Unanimous 8th-round decision.
17 July 1950	154½	Joey Fernandez	154½	8-6-4	Elizabeth, New Jersey	W PTS	Diamond awarded 6 of 8 rounds
26 June 1950	152½	Hurley Sanders	155	17-12-3	Ridgewood Grove	W UD	
12 June 1950	152¼	Tony Bove	146¾	16-1-1	Ridgewood Grove	W TKO	Won in the 5th round.
20 May 1950	155¾	Eddie Edwards	154	18-8-1	Ridgewood Grove	W PTS	
6 May 1950	155¾	Eddie Edwards	154	18-7-1	Ridgewood Grove	W PTS	
15 April 1950	156½	Tommy Englehardt	155½	17-5-2	Ridgewood Grove	W PTS	
1 April 1950	156¾	Ben Jones	156½	10-15-1	Ridgewood Grove	W TKO	
18 March 1950	157	Kid Pambele	153½	7-12-2	Ridgewood Grove	W KO	Knockout in the 1st of 6 rounds.
4 March 1950	156	Johnny Crosby	151	2-17-1	Ridgewood Grove	W KO	
23 February 1950	156	James Suber	151½	6-12-2	Sunnyside Garden	W KO	
16 February 1950	155½	Gordon Hunt	157	0-1-0	Broadway Arena	W KO	
11 February 1950	157½	Louis Johnson	154½	1-1-0	Ridgewood Grove	W KO	
6 February 1950	150	Jimmy DeCerio	151	8-8-4	Eastern Parkway Arena	W KO	
29 December 1949	154½	Mike Santonino	156	17-11-1	Broadway Arena	W KO	Middleweight match.
15 December 1949	151	Sammy LaRotta	149	11-3-1	Broadway Arena	L points	
28 November 1949	151½	Frankie Navedo	144½	1-8-0	Jamaica Arena	W KO	
27 October 1949	159½	Tony Bove	145¾	9-0-1	Broadway Arena	L TKO	
15 September 1949	147	Vince Martinez	147	8-0-0	Fort Hamilton Arena	L points	
2 September 1949	146	Engel Cordova	148½		Long Beach Stadium	W KO	
21 July 1949	147½	Joe Esposito	145½	1-0-1	Fort Hamilton Arena	W KO	Knockout 2:23 minutes into the first of four rounds.
