= Artie, West Virginia =

Unincorporated community in West Virginia, United States

- Unincorporated community
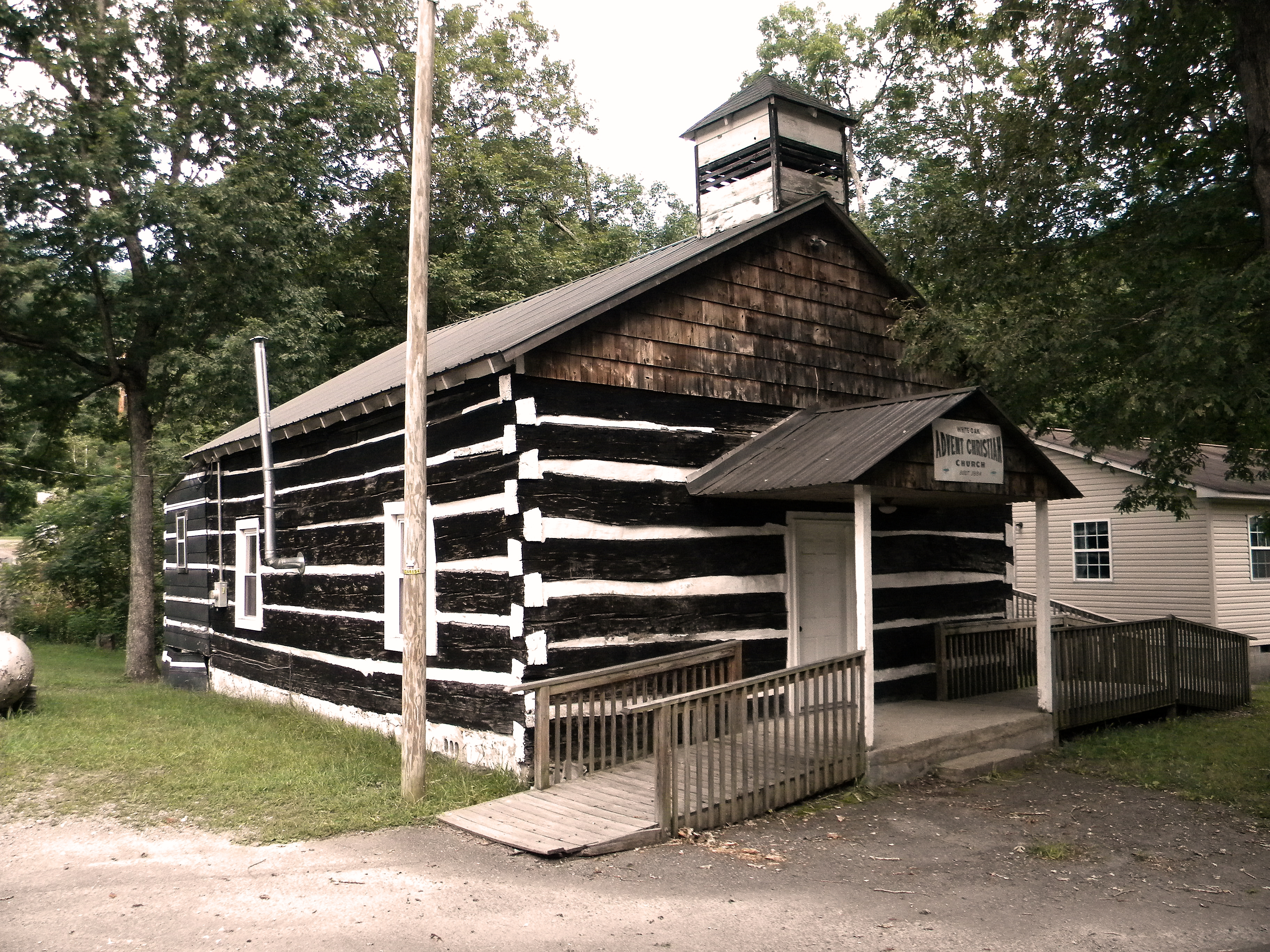
- White Oak Log Church at Artie, West Virginia

- Location within West Virginia Location within the United States
- Coordinates: 37°55′57″N 81°21′34″W
- Country: United States
- State: West Virginia
- County: Raleigh

Government
  - Type: none
- Elevation: 1,348 ft (411 m)
- Time zone: UTC-5 (Eastern (EST))
  - Summer (DST): UTC-4 (EDT)
- ZIP code: 25008
- Area codes: 304 & 681
- GNIS feature ID: 1553754

Artie is an unincorporated community in Raleigh County, West Virginia, United States. Artie is 5.5 miles (8.9 km) west-northwest of Pax. Artie had a post office, which opened on October 5, 1903, and closed on February 1, 1997.

The main road through Artie is County Route 1, also known as Clear Fork Road. The Clear Fork describes the river in Artie, which is part of the headwaters of the Big Coal River. County Route 1 crosses the river twice in Artie via roadway bridges. Both bridges have been named for United States Armed Services members, US Army PFC Shelby Dean Stover, and USAF SMSgt Billie Edward Hodge.

In 2014, standout West Virginia sports player and coach, Tex Williams, opened a museum of sports artifacts inside the old Post Office building.
