= Rivian R1T =

American electric mid-size pickup truck

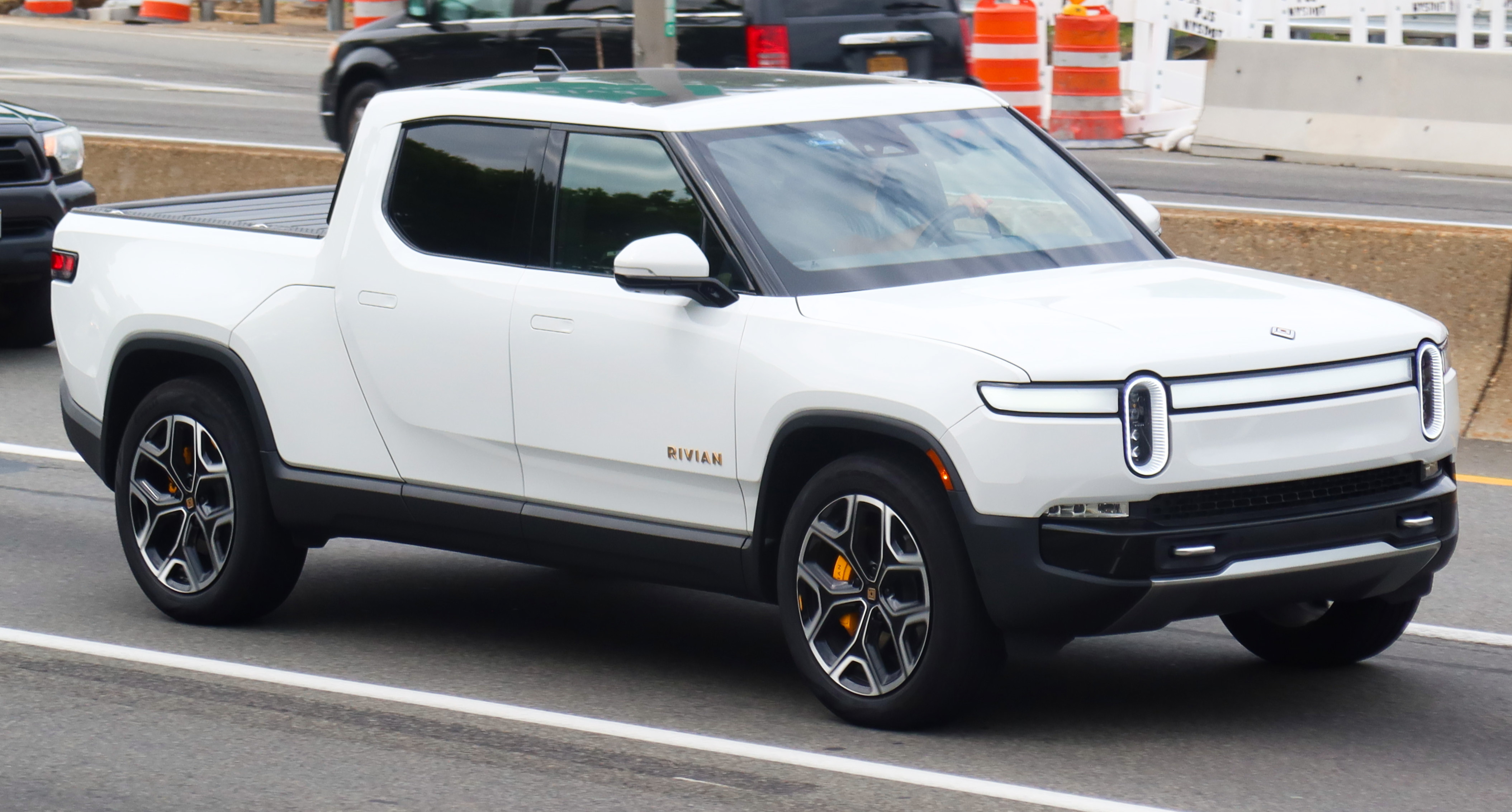

Overview
- Manufacturer: Rivian
- Production: 2021–present
- Model years: 2022–present
- Assembly: United States: Normal, Illinois
- Designer: Jeff Hammoud

Body and chassis
- Class: luxury mid-size pickup truck
- Body style: 4-door crew cab
- Layout: Dual-motor four-wheel drive with differential at each axle; Quad-motor four-wheel drive, individual wheel drive
- Chassis: Body-on-frame (chassis is bolted and glued to body, not welded)
- Related: Rivian R1S

Powertrain
- Electric motor: AC permanent magnet motors
- Power output: 533 hp (397 kW) – Dual-Motor; 665 hp (496 kW) – Dual Motor Performance; 835 hp (623 kW) – Quad Motor; 1,025 hp (764 kW) – Quad Motor Gen 2
- Transmission: Single-speed
- Battery: 105, 135 or 149 kWh Li-ion pack
- Electric range: 105 kWh – up to 231 mi (372 km) EPA; 135 kWh – up to 314 mi (505 km); 149 kWh – up to 401 mi (645 km)
- Plug-in charging: DC: 210 kW, 400 V (135 kWh); AC: 1.44 kW, 120V or 11.52 kW, 240 V

Dimensions
- Wheelbase: 135.9 in (3,452 mm)
- Length: 217.1 in (5,514 mm)
- Width: 81.8 in (2,078 mm) (mirrors folded)
- Height: 75.7 in (1,923 mm) (Note: With antenna.)
- Curb weight: 6,949 lb (3,152 kg) (Note: On-road package, 135 kWh pack, no spare)

The Rivian R1T is a battery electric mid-size pickup truck produced by the American company Rivian. The first production R1T was manufactured in Illinois on September 28, 2021, and was delivered to a customer. The official EPA range for the Rivian R1T (MY 2022–2024) ranges from 255–420 miles (410–676 km), depending on drivetrain, battery pack capacity and wheel size.

== History ==
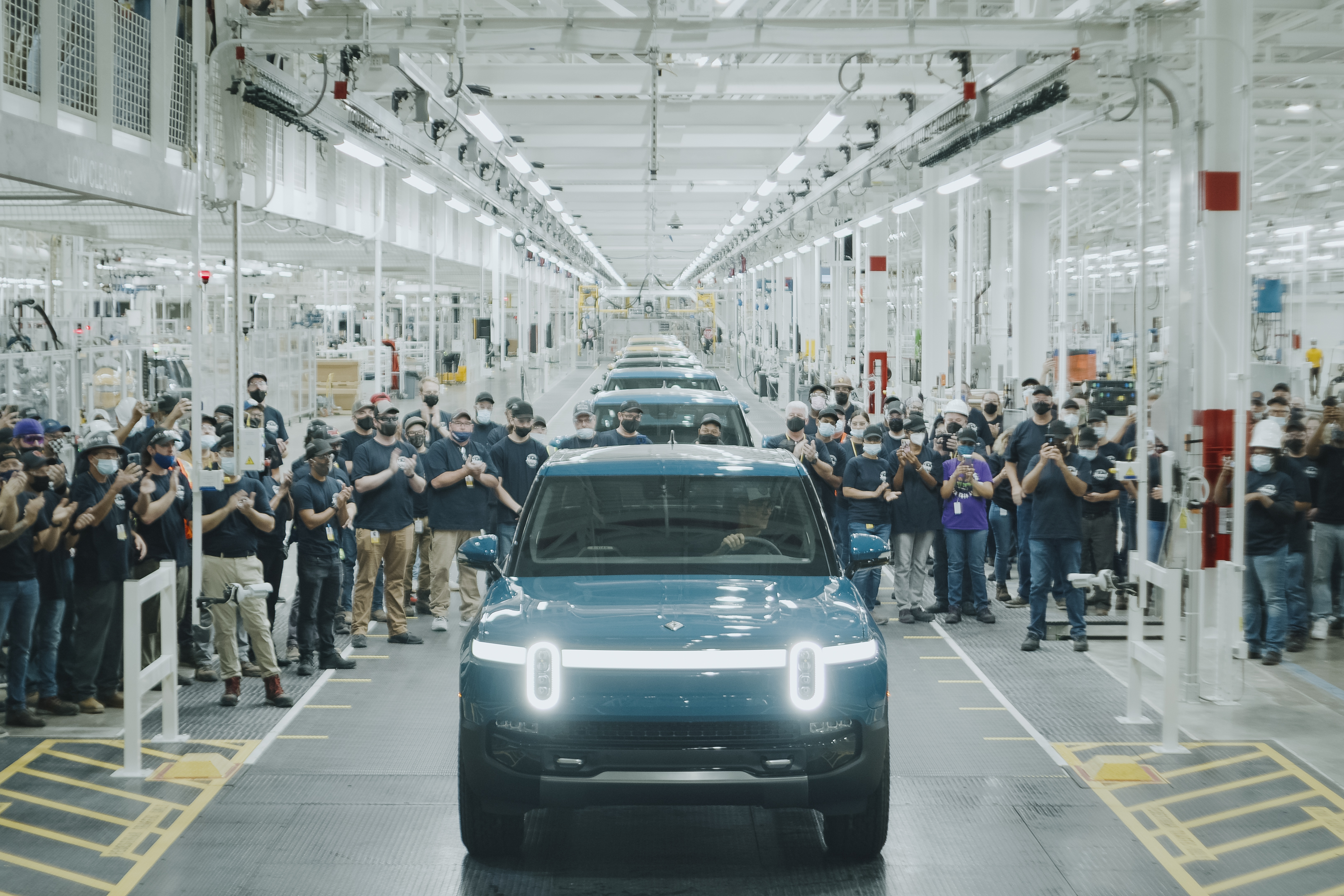
First production Rivian R1T rolls off the Normal, Illinois assembly line, September 2021.

Rivian unveiled the upcoming truck under the working name A1T in May 2018 but rebadged the vehicle in November 2018 as the R1T. Designed to be off-road capable, the 2018 concept design was planned to have 14 in (360 mm) of ground clearance, feature an 800 hp (600 kW) electric motor, with the most expensive models being designed to achieve approximately 450 miles (720 km) on a charge. The company claimed that early prototype testing showed the truck to be able to accelerate from 0–60 mph (97 km/h) in under 3.3 seconds, wade through 3 ft 7 in (1.1 m) of water and climb a 45 degree incline. These design objectives were largely achieved in the 2021 production vehicle release. Rivian said it was designing the vehicles to facilitate "car-sharing" with their autonomous features.

In 2018, Rivian stated it intended to license its electric chassis to other manufacturers as a design base for machinery such as cars and other components. As of 2018, Rivian stated it planned to begin production of the R1T in 2020.

In September 2021, the first customer vehicle rolled off the production line and was delivered to a customer. Rivian began delivering the first R1T trucks to customers in October 2021.

== Design and specifications ==
As initially delivered in 2021, the Rivian R1T is an all-electric, battery-powered, individual wheel drive light duty pickup truck.

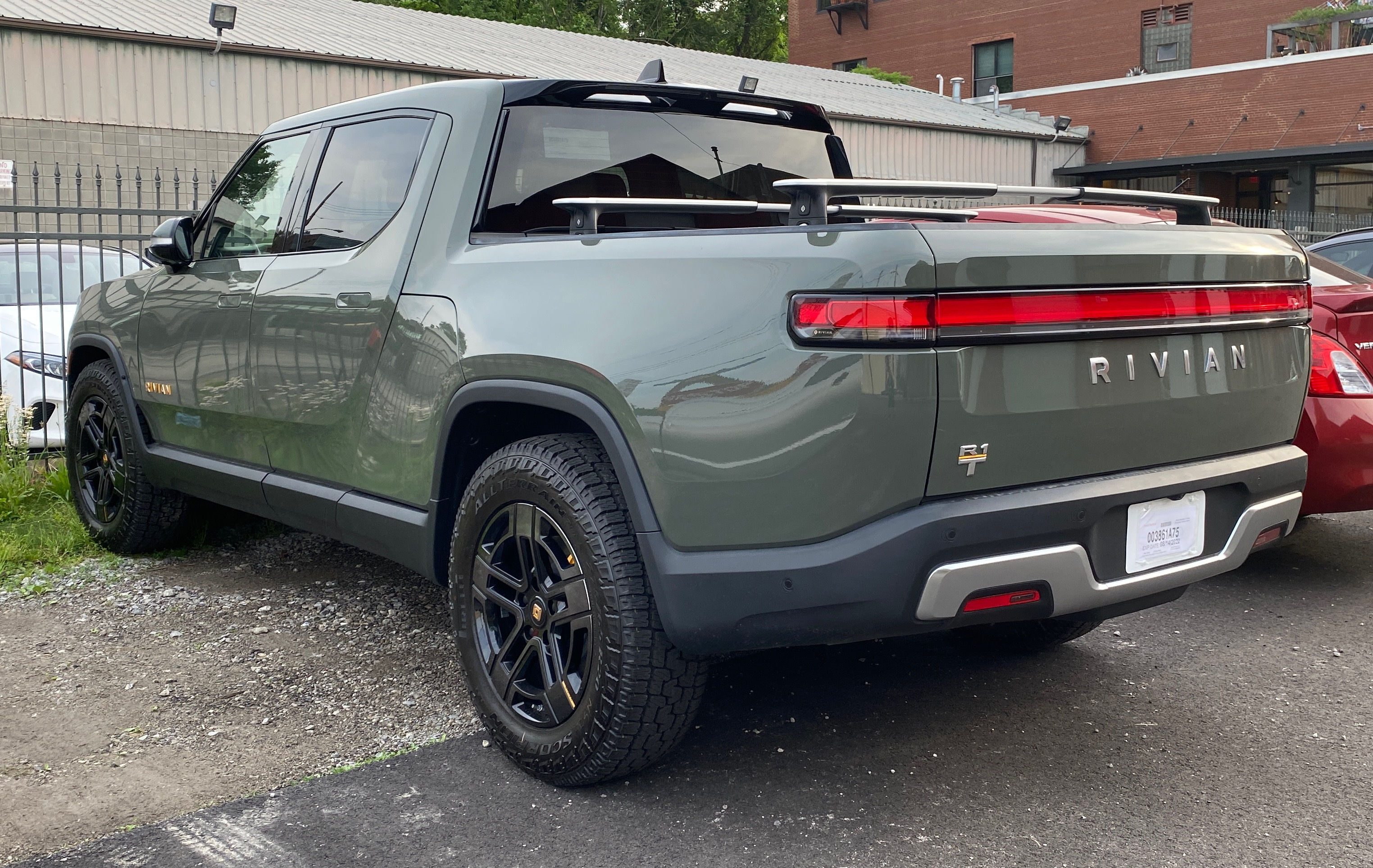
Rivian R1T Launch Edition, rear view

Rivian R1T Adventure with the Road Trip Package and the "Range" wheels - these maximize range thanks to low rolling resistance tires and aerodynamic wheel covers

=== Drivetrain ===
==== Quad-Motor ====
The initial version of the R1T features four electric motors, one on each wheel, that combine to produce 835 hp (623 kW) and deliver 908 ft⋅lb (1,231 N⋅m) of torque. Each motor is an AC permanent magnet motor designed by Robert Bosch GmbH and produced by Rivian under license. The front two motors produce 415 hp (309 kW) and 413 ft⋅lb (560 N⋅m) of torque while the rear two motors produce 420 hp (310 kW) and 495 ft⋅lb (671 N⋅m) of torque. The four motors are carried near the centerline of the chassis and use direct-drive transaxles to each wheel; the quad-motor setup allows the use of a torque vectoring wheel control system, which senses slip on each wheel with millisecond granularity and responds by "distribut[ing] the proper amount of power to each wheel, precisely as needed."

==== Dual-Motor ====
In March 2022, Rivian announced it would develop and sell a dual-motor powertrain for the R1T, with one electric motor for each axle. The price of the dual-motor (DM) version would start around the same initial price at which the quad-motor (QM) version was offered, while the QM version would increase in price by almost 20%. The output of the DM version was expected to be more than 600 hp (450 kW) and 600 lb⋅ft (810 N⋅m) of torque, but was later published by Rivian at 533 hp (397 kW) and 610 lb⋅ft (830 N⋅m) of torque. The largest ("Max") battery was removed as an option for the QM version in December, limiting availability to DM versions only. The "Enduro" traction motors for the DM versions were developed by Rivian in-house and reduce the number of semiconductors used compared to the QM, alleviating a key component supply restraint; production began in February 2023, although most of the initial production were diverted to Rivian EDVs.

In April 2023, Rivian introduced a "Performance Dual-Motor" option (PDM), which uses software to unlock enhanced performance from the DM motors. With the PDM option, the R1T will produce approximately 700 hp (520 kW) and 700 lb⋅ft (950 N⋅m) of torque. As tested by Motor Trend, each PDM traction motor has a maximum output of 350 hp (260 kW) and 428 lb⋅ft (580 N⋅m); combined output is slightly less than double, at 665 hp (496 kW) and 829 lb⋅ft (1,124 N⋅m). Externally, the PDM (silver accented badging, black brake calipers) can be distinguished from the QM (yellow accented badging and yellow brake calipers).

The first R1T DM was completed on May 25, 2023, with deliveries to commence in June.

R1T configurations
Motors Battery (kW-hr) [wheel]			Dual-Motor (DM)	Performance Dual-Motor (PDM)	Quad-Motor (QM)
Motors Battery (kW-hr) [wheel]			Output		
Motors Battery (kW-hr) [wheel]			533 hp (397 kW) & 610 lb⋅ft (827 N⋅m)	665 hp (496 kW) & 829 lb⋅ft (1,124 N⋅m)	835 hp (623 kW) & 908 lb⋅ft (1,231 N⋅m)
Motors Battery (kW-hr) [wheel]			Range		
Standard	(105)	[21"]	270 mi (430 km)	N/A	
Standard	(105)	[22"]	255 mi (410 km)	N/A	
Standard	(105)	[20"AT]	not yet available	N/A	
Standard+	(121)	[21"]	315 mi (507 km)		
Standard+	(121)	[22"]	300 mi (480 km)		
Standard+	(121)	[20"AT]	280 mi (450 km)		
Large	(135)	[21"]	352 mi (566 km)		328 mi (528 km)
Large	(135)	[22"]	341 mi (549 km)		303 mi (488 km)
Large	(135)	[20"AT]	307 mi (494 km)		274 mi (441 km)
Max	(149)	[21"]	410 mi (660 km)		N/A
Max	(149)	[22"]	380 mi (610 km)		N/A
Max	(149)	[20"AT]	355 mi (571 km)		N/A

==== Storage batteries ====
The Rivian R1T was initially offered with three different batteries sized 105 kWh ("Standard"), 135 kWh ("Large"), and 180 kWh ("Max") of energy storage. The ("Max") battery pack was later revised to 142kWh usable capacity, and that was the capacity that was delivered. Rivian R1T has an estimated range of 230 mi (370 km) with the smallest battery, 314 mi (505 km) for the medium battery, and over 400 mi (640 km) for the largest battery. Additional batteries can be mounted in the R1T's bed for improved range. Those backup/auxiliary batteries can be charged by another R1T, if no charging infrastructure is available. The auxiliary pack and Rivian-to-Rivian charging features have thus far failed to materialize, however.

The "Large" battery pack consists of 7,776 cells (2170 type) in a nine-module assembly for the 135 kWh battery pack. The Li-ion cells are manufactured by Samsung; battery pack is assembled by Rivian in Normal, Illinois. A flashlight is available on the driver-side door containing a Li-ion cell identical to the cells used in the main battery, bringing the total cell count in the vehicle to 7,777.

The "Standard" battery pack will use LiFePO_{4} chemistry, which eliminates the use of nickel and cobalt, reducing costs. R1T vehicles with "Standard" batteries are expected to ship in 2023.

==== Efficiency and range ====
The U.S. EPA rates the 2022 model year R1T QM at 70 mpg‑e (48 kW⋅h/100 mi) for the combined city/highway driving cycle, tying it with the Ford F-150 Lightning as the most efficient "Standard Pickup Truck" sold for that model year. City economy is slightly better at 74 mpg‑e (46 kW⋅h/100 mi) than the rated highway economy of 66 mpg‑e (51 kW⋅h/100 mi). According to Car and Driver magazine, the real world range with the "Large" 129 kWh battery ranges from 220 to 280 miles (355 to 450 km) highway driving, depending on tire choice. Wheel size also affects estimated range.

Regenerative braking is possible at up to 0.21 g, which charges the battery with energy dissipated during braking. The R1T can charge at up to 225 kW and supports Plug&Charge.

=== Chassis ===
The chassis includes braking, suspension, and cooling systems with a battery in the center. Rivian's relatively flat, low center of gravity chassis is a typical electric vehicle skateboard, which enables straightforward modification by the manufacturer for other body types. The suspension uses a "sophisticated suspension architecture" with dynamic roll control. The air suspension allows adjustment of the ride height through a range of 6.5 in (170 mm), giving the R1T a variable ground clearance of 7.9–14.4 in (200–370 mm). Adaptive dampers are used for all four wheels; the front uses unequal-length double-wishbone suspension while the rear uses a multi-link suspension.

The front-to-rear weight distribution is 51/49. Overall, the vehicle is 217.1 in (5.51 m) long, 81.8 in (2.08 m) wide (with mirrors folded), and 72.1–78.3 in (1.83–1.99 m) tall. The gross vehicle weight rating is 8,532 lb (3,870 kg) when carrying its maximum load of 1,700 lb (770 kg) (driver + cargo + passengers). The coefficient of drag is 0.30.

Rivian has applied for a patent on a novel tight-turning technique where differential motor torque between the turned front wheels and back wheels is applied. Previously referred to as "Tank Turn" mode, the software to support the feature was not ready and so it was not included with the initial production trucks in late 2021. In June 2023, Rivian announced it would not release the feature, as using it could damage roadways and surfaces.

=== Performance ===
The R1T QM has a tested acceleration time of 3.0 seconds from 0 to 60 mph (97 km/h). Top speed is 110 mph (180 km/h).

=== Interior features ===
The R1T has four electrical outlets: dual 15A/120V AC outlets in the cargo bed; single 15A/120V AC outlet in the frunk and another in the gear tunnel.

The interior display size is 12 in (30 cm) for the driver's instrument cluster plus a 15 in (38 cm) combined display to control infotainment, navigation, climate, comfort functions in the center of dashboard.

=== Storage and towing ===
Rivian R1T storage and interior

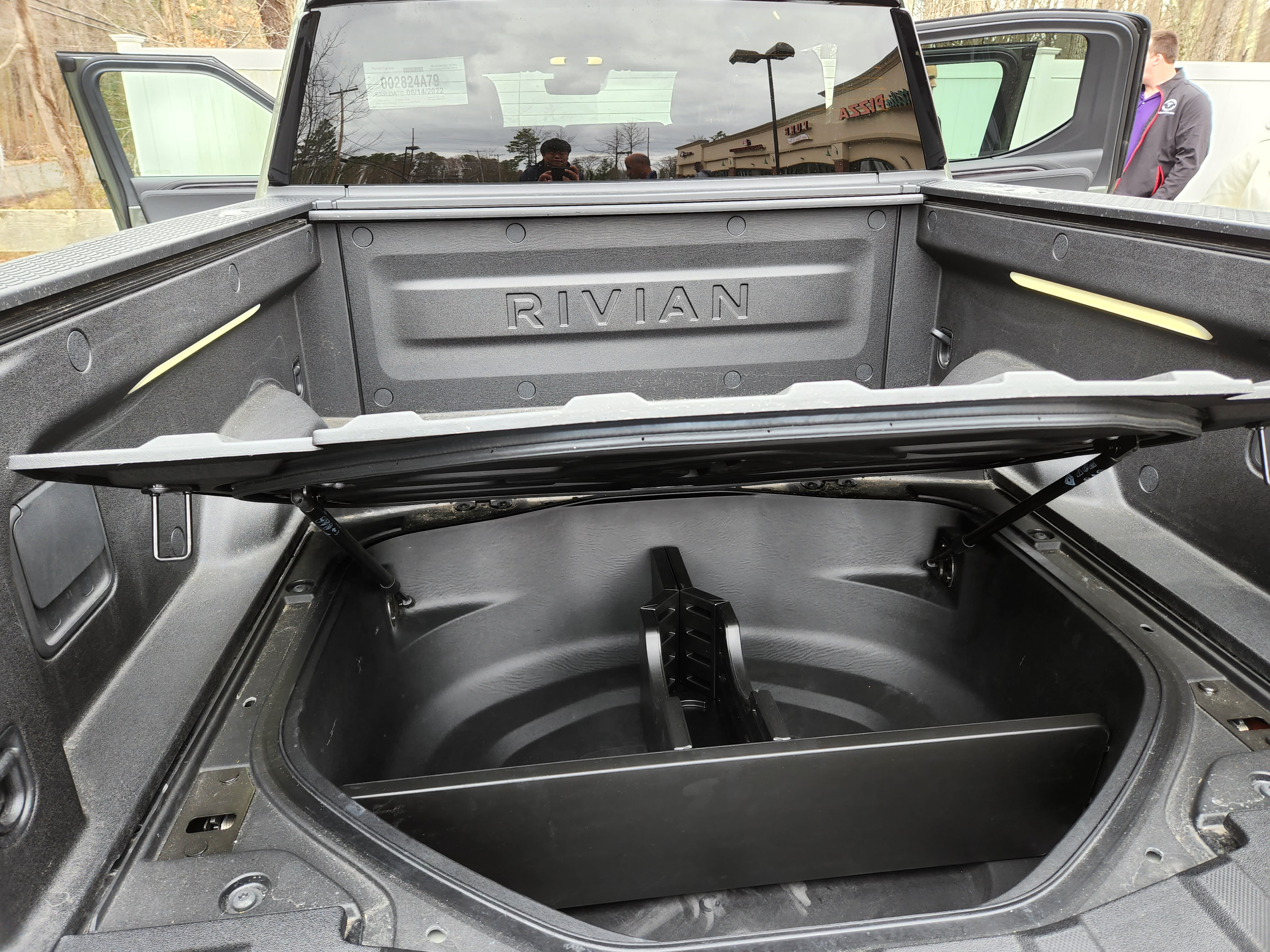
Storage space underneath the cargo bed

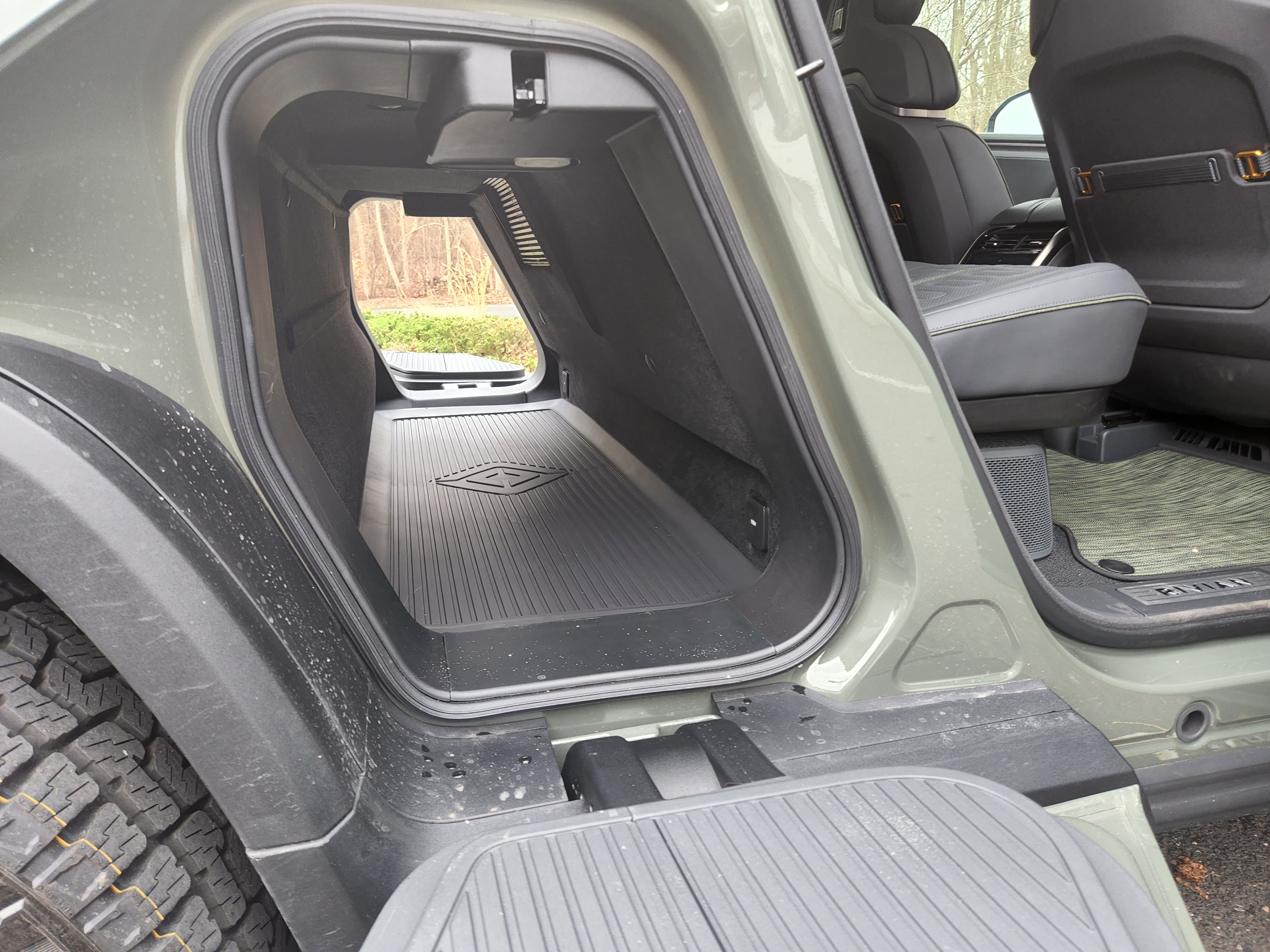
The Gear Tunnel runs the full width of the vehicle behind the rear seating row, providing additional storage space

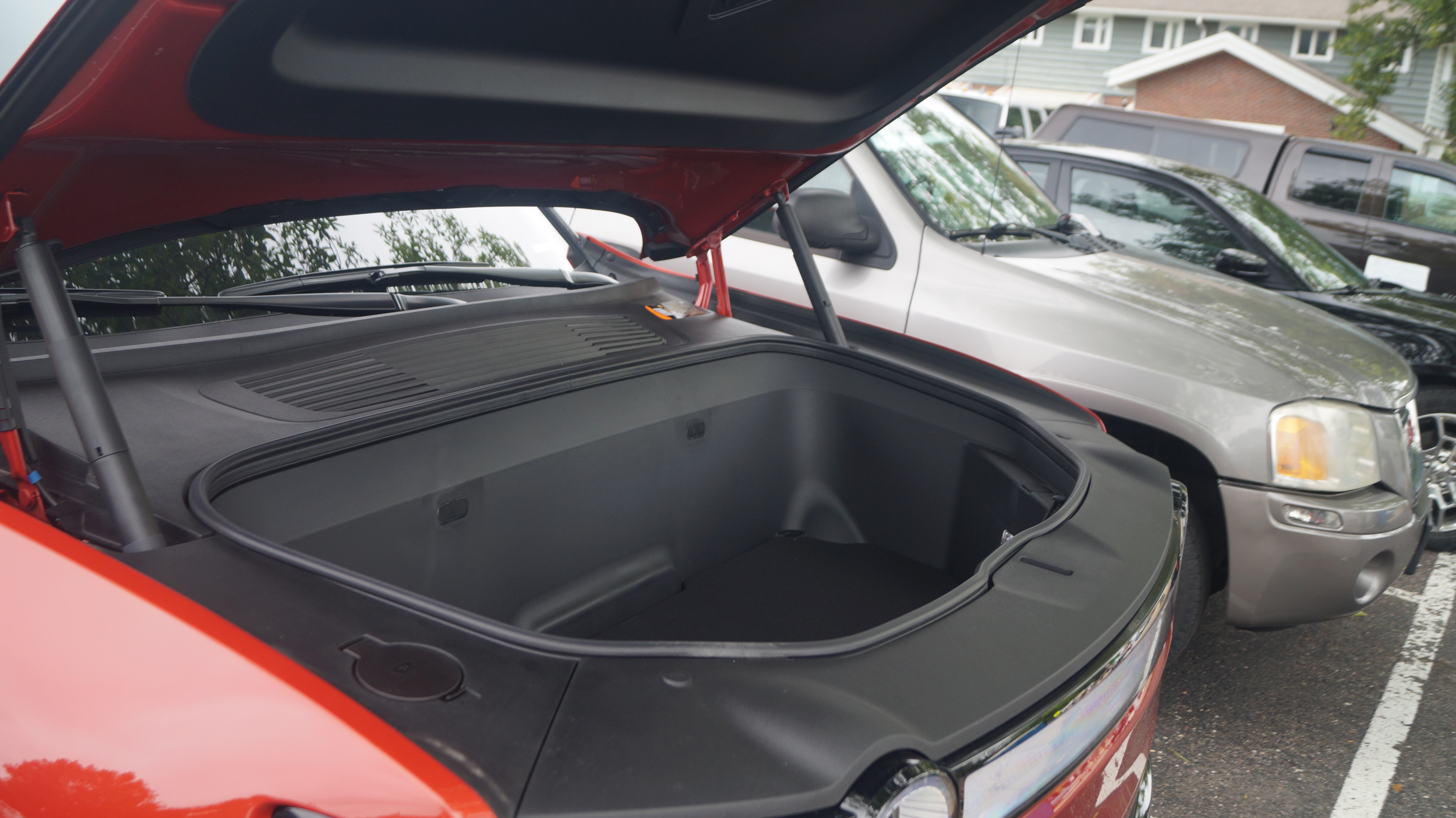
The "frunk" (front trunk)

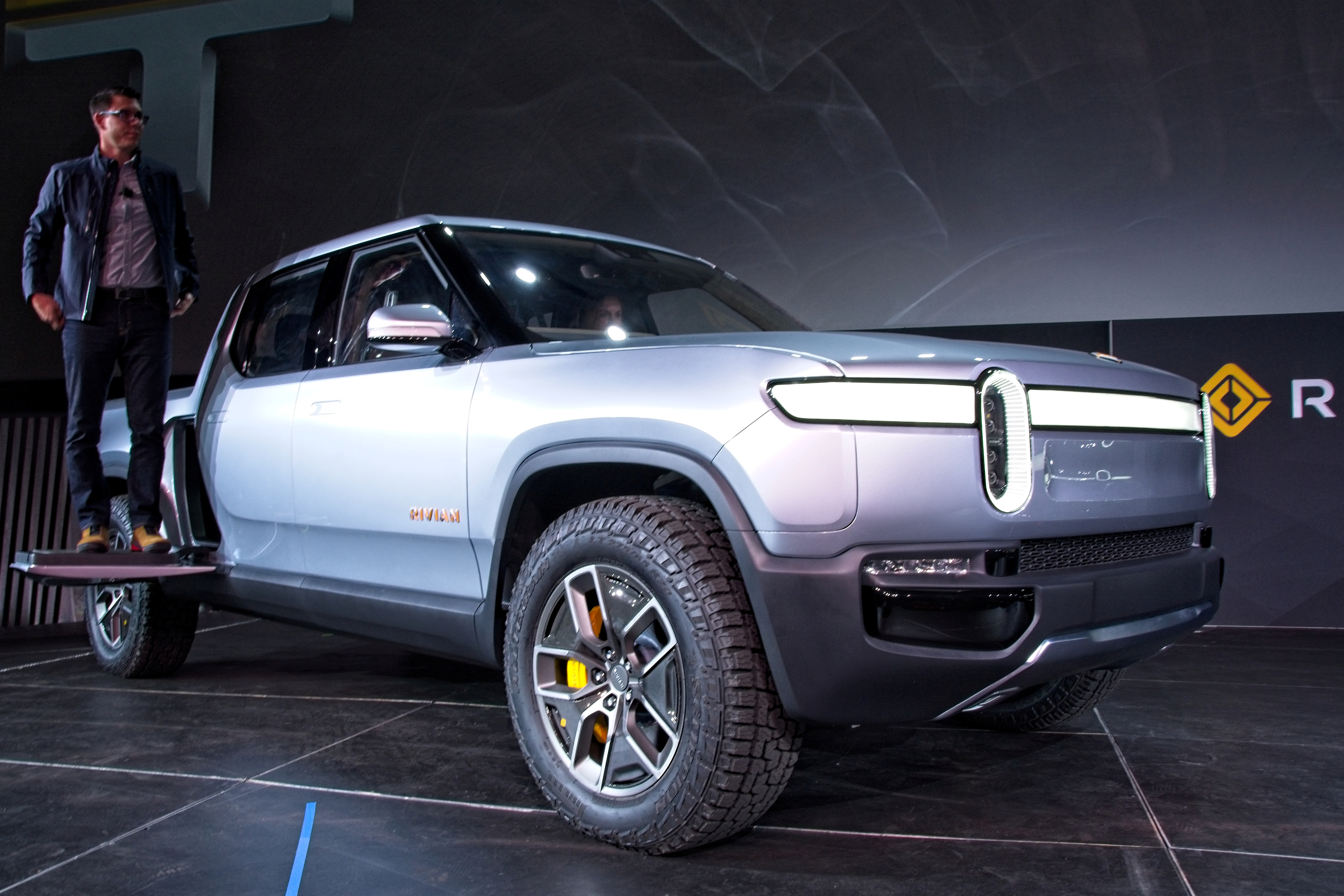
RJ Scaringe, Rivian CEO, demonstrates the Gear Tunnel door strength

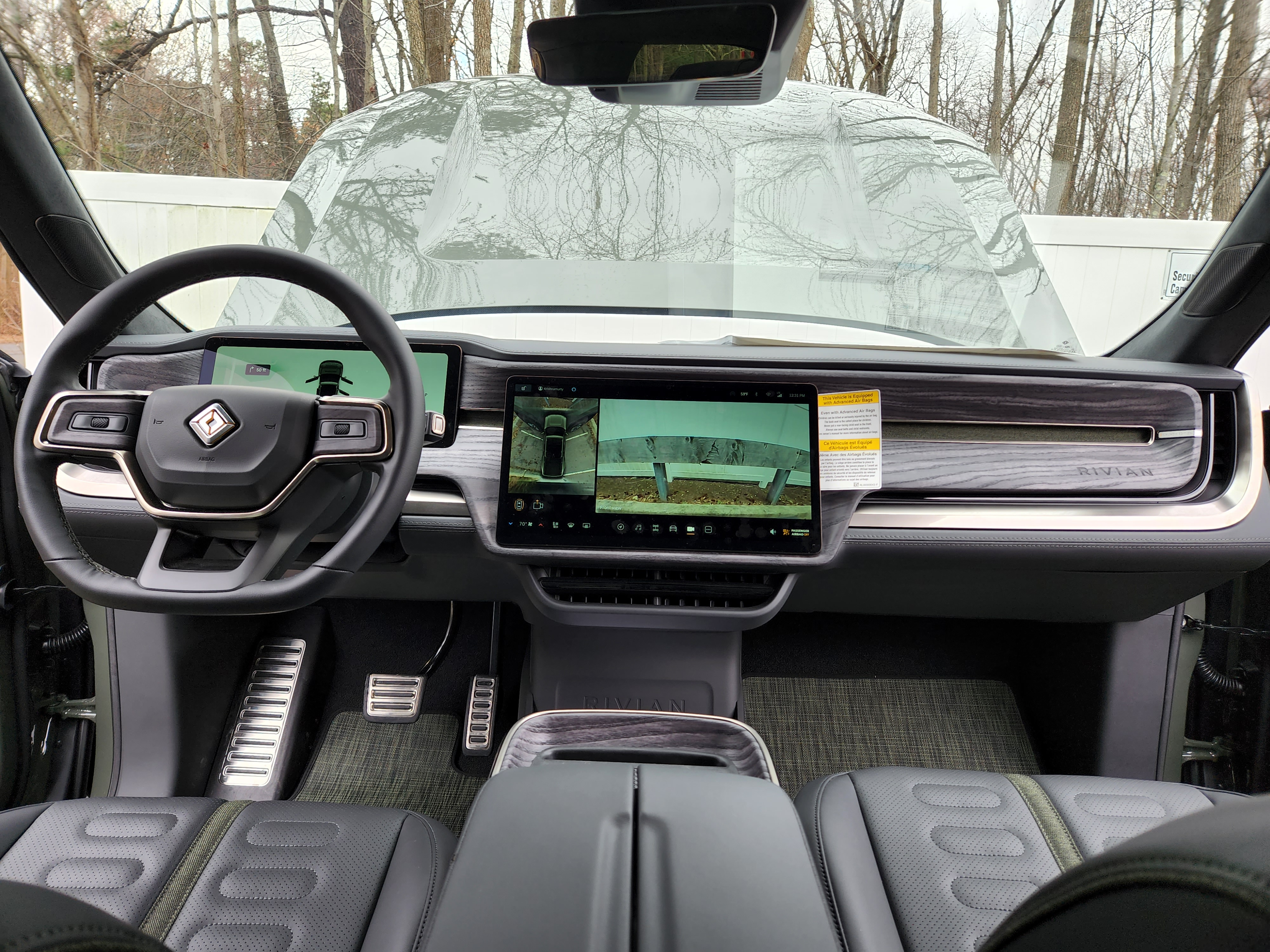
Interior and dashboard

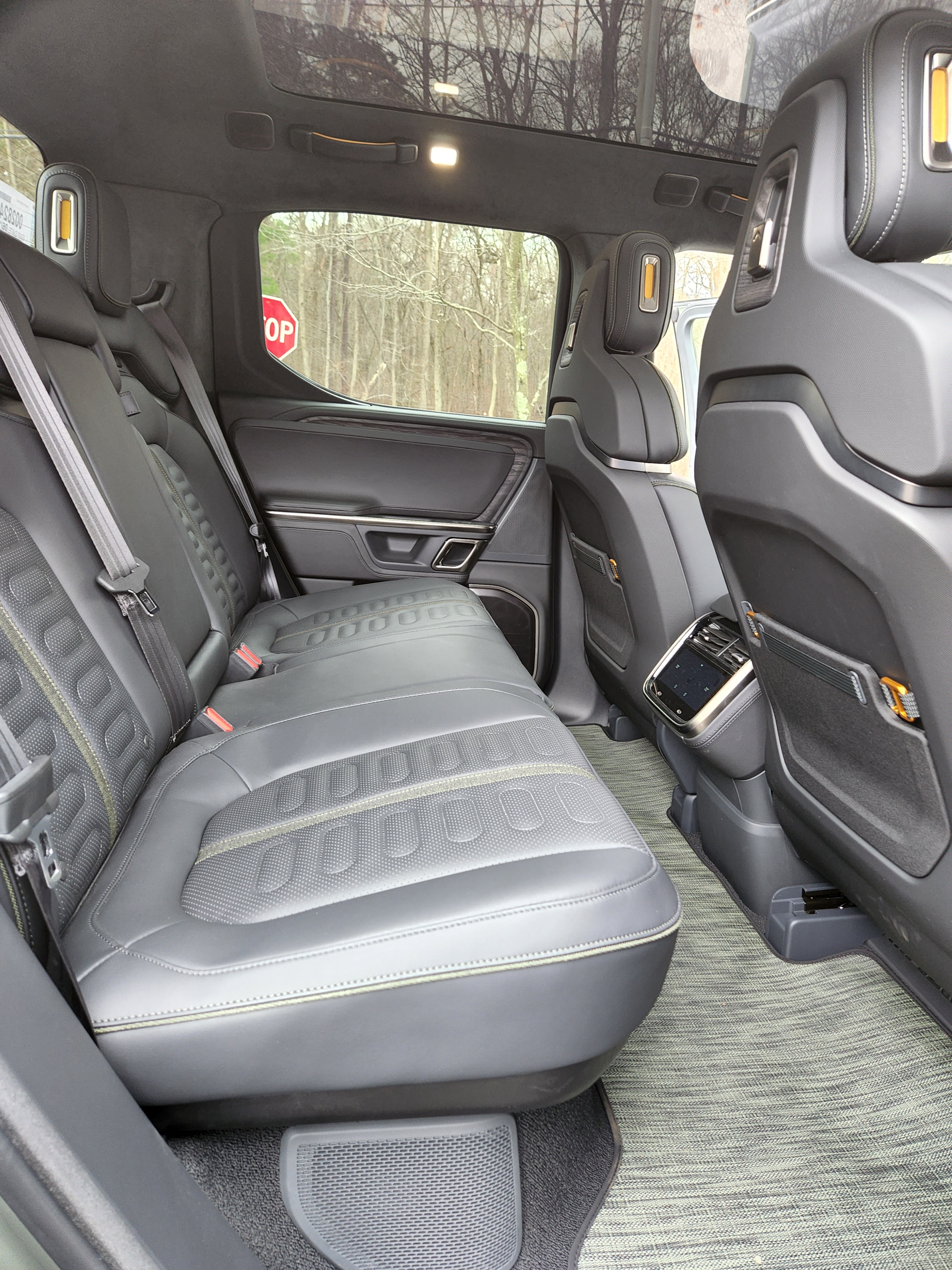
Second row seating

The cargo bed is 4.5 ft (1.4 m) long. Its width at the narrowest point, between the wheel wells, is 50 in (1.3 m). Towing capacity is 11,000 lb (4,990 kg), as tested in conditions exceeding 100 °F (38 °C) on a desert road that is specified by the Society of Automotive Engineers (SAE) as the standard for determining a vehicle's tow rating. The Class V tow hitch is hidden behind a removable panel.

The "frunk" — located where the engine would be in an internal-combustion-engine-powered truck — offers 11 cu ft (311 L) of additional cargo space, and contains 12 V DC outlets, a 15A/120V AC outlet, and a drain.

Another storage compartment is the 11.6 cu ft (328 L) 65 in (1.7 m)-long Gear Tunnel, which runs the width of the truck and can be used for storing sports equipment or a number of available accessories. It also has a 12 V DC outlet and a 15A/120V AC outlet.

=== Off-road driving and overlanding ===
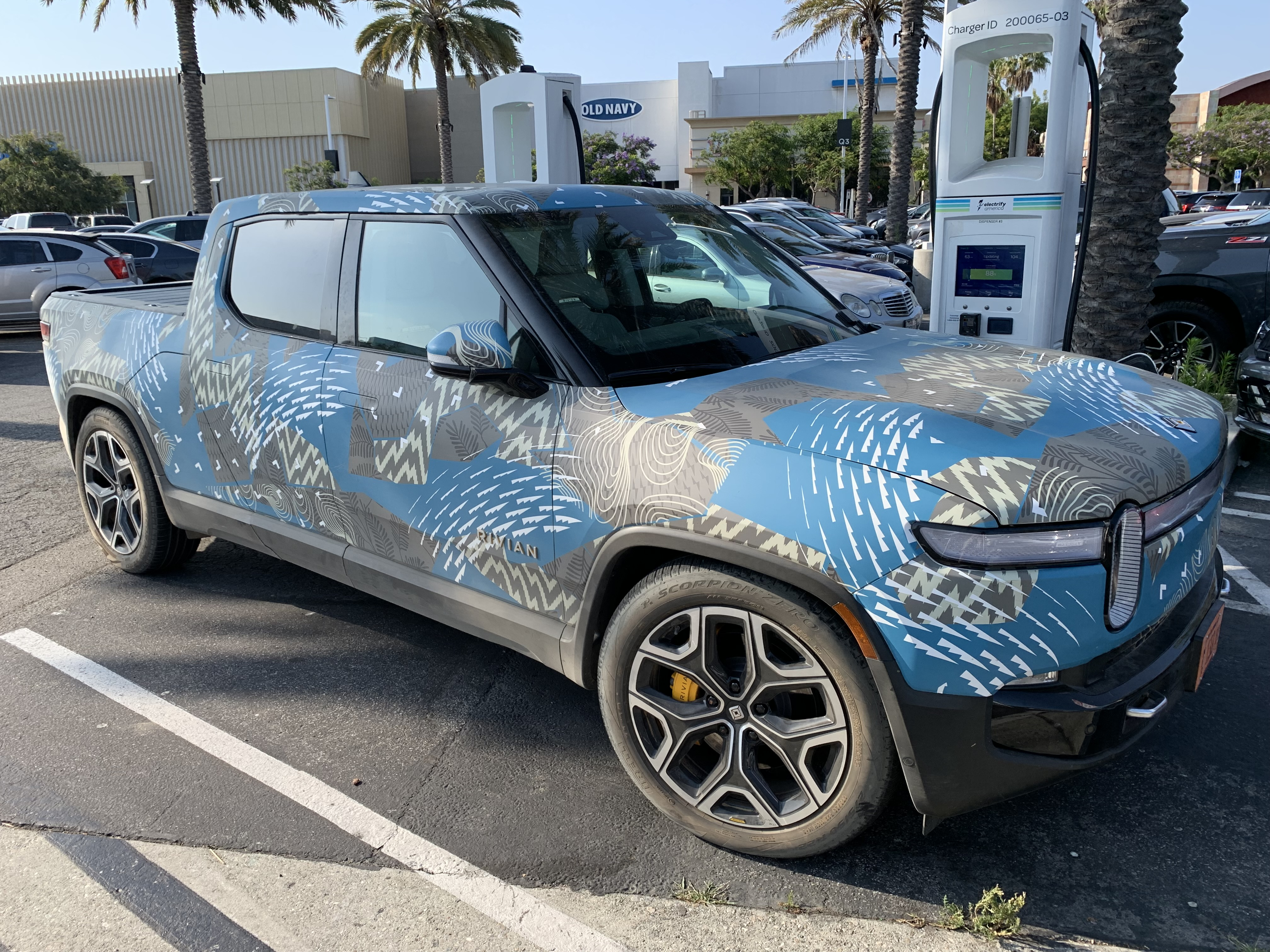
Suspension lowered for street use

The vehicle has an air suspension which allows for 6.5 inches (165 mm) of vertical travel — the ground clearance can be as low as 7.9 inches (201 mm) or as high as 14.4 inches (366 mm). Depending on the wheel configuration, the maximum ground clearance can be even higher, at 14.9 inches (378 mm). Maximum wading depth in water is 43.1 inches (1,095 mm). Approach, departure, breakover angles are 35.5, 30 and 26.4 degrees respectively. Custom made Pirelli 275/65 R20 all-terrain tires are available as an option.

Custom drive modes—which adjust the suspension, ride-height, throttle and steering—include "All-Purpose, Sport, Conserve, Tow and Off-Road", plus sub modes for off-road that include "Rock Crawl, Soft Sand and Rally."

Rivian is offering vehicle options for off roading: a reinforced underbody shield with tow hooks, a "camp kitchen"—two induction cooking elements (1440W each, Dometic CI20), a sink, plus 30 pieces of outdoor cooking/dining equipment—that collapses into the R1T gear tunnel, as well as a rooftop tent for three. A winch is available as an option and can be controlled via Rivian's iOS app.

=== Hands-free driving ===
It is equipped with 11 cameras, 12 ultrasonic sensors, and 5 radar sensors which will be used in Rivian's suite of advanced driver assistance systems.

R1T has safety and driver assistance package called the Driver+. On selected highways the truck is capable of self-steering and controlling speed following the instructions of the driver similar to Tesla's AutoPilot. During hands-free driving the driver has to keep their eyes on road and Rivian R1T has cameras inside the cabin to monitor the driver's activity. The hands-free feature works well in straight roads but needs driver's input when taking corners.

=== Wiring ===
Second generation R1S/T vehicles adopted a zonal wiring architecture or the earlier ECU/device approach. The new approach reduces the total wiring length by 1.6 miles and weight by 20 kg (44 lb), reducing material costs by 20% and carbon footprint by 15%.

The earlier R1s used a domain-based architecture, pairing each category of software with a piece of hardware. The result required 17 ECUs. The second generation provides four systems with separate ECUs: infotainment, autonomy, vehicle access, drive units, and battery management. The remaining functions require only three ECUs.

== Awards ==
The Rivian R1T was awarded the 2022 Truck of the Year by Motor Trend.

== Safety ==
The 2024 model year R1T was awarded "Top Safety Pick+" by IIHS, as it received a Good rating in the updated moderate overlap crash test with low risk of injury to the dummy.

IIHS scores (Gen 1 - 2022)
Small overlap front	Good
Small overlap front: driver-side	Good
Small overlap front: passenger-side	Good
Moderate overlap front: original test	Good
Side: original test	Good
Side: updated test	Good
Roof Strength	Good
Head restraints and seats	Good
Seatbelt reminders	Poor
LATCH ease of use	Good

IIHS scores (Gen 2 - 2024)
Small overlap front	Good
Moderate overlap front (original test)	Good
Moderate overlap front (updated test)	Good
Side (updated test)	Good
Headlights (varies by trim/option)	Good
Front crash prevention: vehicle-to-pedestrian	Acceptable
Child seat anchors (LATCH) ease of use	Good

== Sales ==
Calendar year	U.S.
2022	9,900
2023	19,410
2024	15,799

== See also ==
- Rivian R1S, an electric SUV sharing most of its components with the R1T
