= Torque vectoring =

Technology in all-wheel drive vehicles

Torque vectoring is a technology employed in automobile differentials that has the ability to vary the torque to each half-shaft with an electronic system; or in rail vehicles which achieve the same using individually motored wheels. This method of power transfer has recently become popular in all-wheel drive vehicles. Some newer front-wheel drive vehicles also have a basic torque vectoring differential. As technology in the automotive industry improves, more vehicles are equipped with torque vectoring differentials. This allows for the wheels to grip the road for better launch and handling.

== History ==
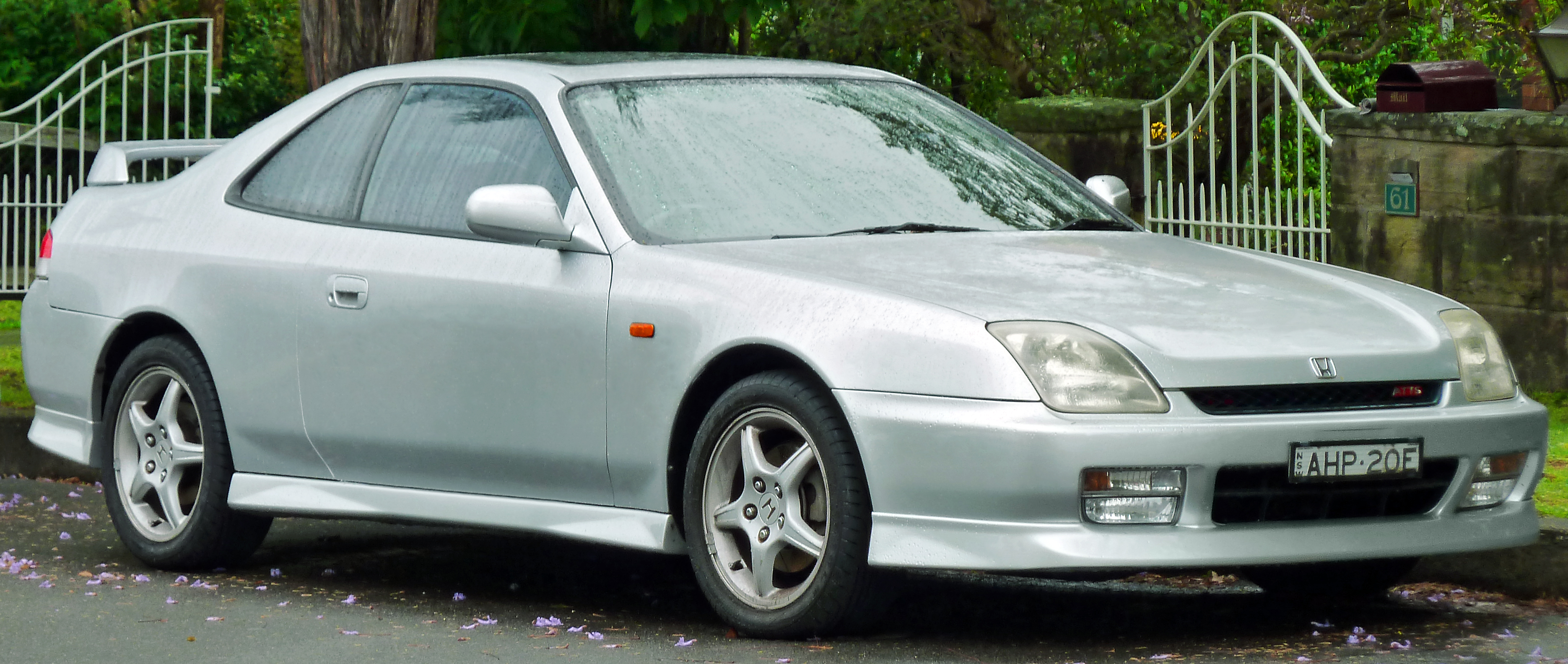
5th-gen Prelude VTi-R with ATTS (Australia, 2011)

In 1996, Honda and Mitsubishi released sporty vehicles with torque vectoring systems. The torque vectoring idea builds on the basic principles of a standard differential. A torque vectoring differential performs basic differential tasks while also transmitting torque independently between wheels. This torque transferring ability improves handling and traction in almost any situation. Torque vectoring differentials were originally used in racing. Mitsubishi rally cars were some of the earliest to use the technology. The technology has slowly developed and is now being implemented in a small variety of production vehicles. The most common use of torque vectoring in automobiles today is in all-wheel drive vehicles.

The flagship 1996 fifth-generation Honda Prelude was equipped with an Active Torque Transfer System (ATTS) torque-vectoring differential driving the front wheels; it was known in different markets as the Type S (Japan), VTi-S (Europe), and Type SH (North America). In essence, ATTS is a small automatic transmission coupled to the differential, with an electronic control unit actuating clutches to vary the torque output between each driven wheel. ATTS effectively counteracted the natural tendency of the front-engine, front-wheel-drive Prelude to understeer. Honda later developed the system into their Super Handling All-Wheel-Drive (SH-AWD) system by 2004, which improved handling by increasing torque to the outside wheels.

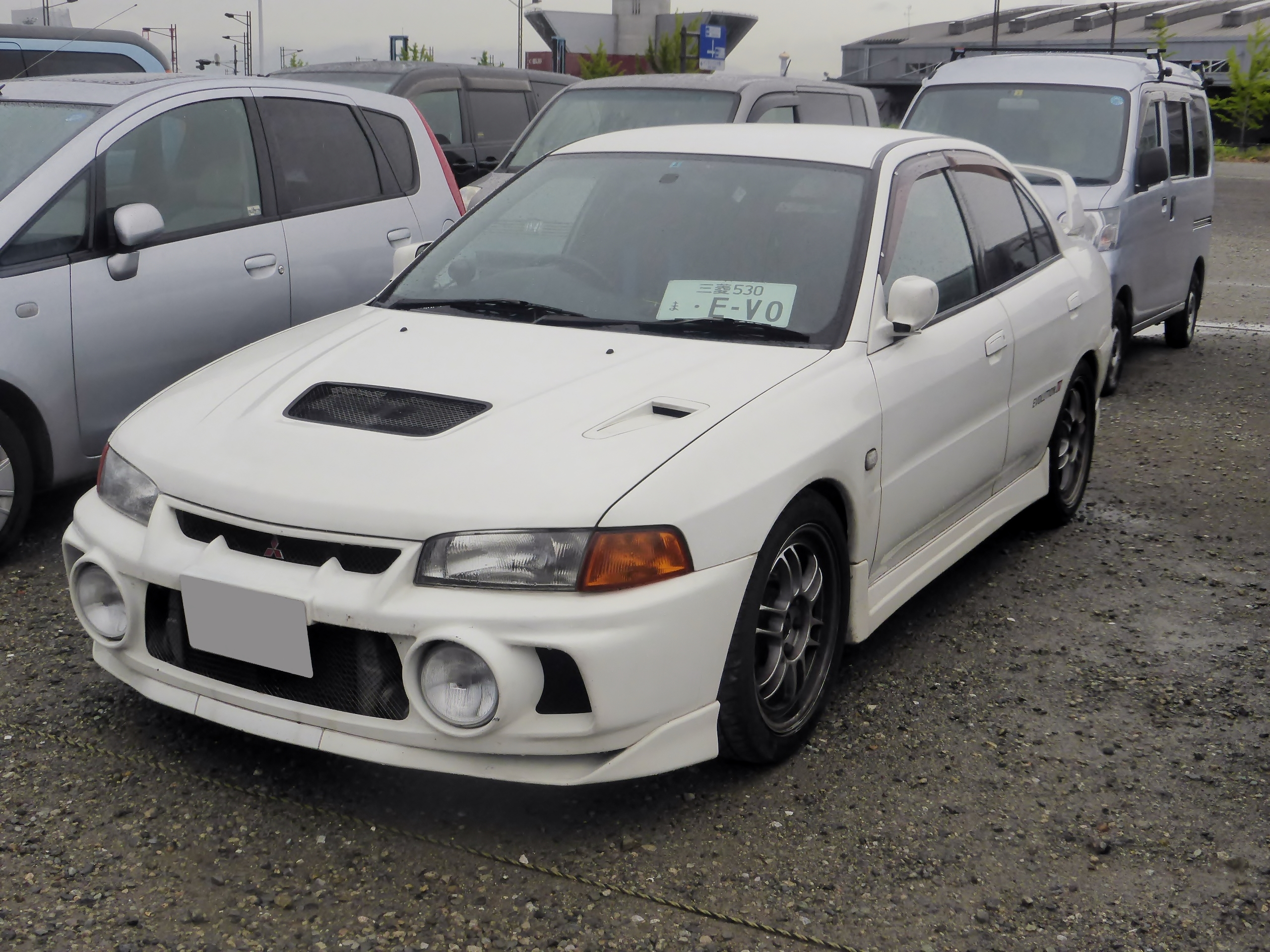
Lancer Evolution IV GSR with AYC (Japan, 2014)

At about the same time, the Lancer Evolution IV GSR was equipped with a similar Active Yaw Control (AYC) system in 1996. AYC was fitted to the rear wheels and similarly works to counteract understeer through a series of electronically controlled clutches that control torque output.

The phrase "Torque Vectoring" was first used by Ricardo PLC in 2006 in relation to their driveline technologies.

== Functional description ==
The idea and implementation of torque vectoring are both complex. The main goal of torque vectoring is to independently vary torque to each wheel. Differentials generally consist of only mechanical components. A torque vectoring differential requires an electronic monitoring system in addition to standard mechanical components. This electronic system tells the differential when and how to vary the torque. Due to the number of wheels that receive power, a front or rear wheel drive differential is less complex than an all-wheel drive differential. The impact of torque distribution is the generation of yaw moment arising from longitudinal forces and changes to the lateral resistance generated by each tire. Applying more longitudinal force reduces the lateral resistance that can be generated. The specific driving condition dictates what the trade-off should be to either damp or excite yaw acceleration. The function is independent of technology and could be achieved by driveline devices for a conventional powertrain, or with electrical torque sources. Then comes the practical element of integration with brake stability functions for both fun and safety.

=== Front/rear wheel drive ===
Torque vectoring differentials on front or rear wheel drive vehicles are less complex, yet share many of the same benefits as all-wheel drive differentials. The differential only varies torque between two wheels. The electronic monitoring system only monitors two wheels, making it less complex. A front-wheel drive differential must take into account several factors. It must monitor rotational and steering angle of the wheels. As these factors vary during driving, different forces are exerted on the wheels. The differential monitors these forces, and adjusts torque accordingly. Many front-wheel drive differentials can increase or decrease torque transmitted to a certain wheel. This ability improves a vehicle's capability to maintain traction in poor weather conditions. When one wheel begins to slip, the differential can reduce the torque to that wheel, effectively braking the wheel. The differential also increases torque to the opposite wheel, helping balance the power output and keep the vehicle stable. A rear-wheel drive torque vectoring differential works similarly to a front-wheel drive differential.

=== All-wheel drive ===
Most torque vectoring differentials are on all-wheel drive vehicles. A basic torque vectoring differential varies torque between the front and rear wheels. This means that, under normal driving conditions, the front wheels receive a set percentage of the engine torque, and the rear wheels receive the rest. If needed, the differential can transfer more torque between the front and rear wheels to improve vehicle performance.

For example, a vehicle might have a standard torque distribution of 90% to the front wheels and 10% to the rear. When necessary, the differential changes the distribution to 50/50. This new distribution spreads the torque more evenly between all four wheels. Having more even torque distribution increases the vehicle's traction.

There are more advanced torque vectoring differentials as well. These differentials build on basic torque transfer between front and rear wheels. They add the ability to transfer torque between individual wheels. This provides an even more effective method of improving handling characteristics. The differential monitors each wheel independently, and distributes available torque to match current conditions.

=== Electric vehicles ===
In electric vehicles all-wheel drive is typically implemented with two independent electric motors, one for each axle. In this case the torque vectoring between the front and rear axles is just a matter of electronically controlling the power distribution between the two motors, which can be done on a millisecond scale. In the case of EVs with three or four motors, even more precise torque vectoring can be applied electronically, with millisecond-specific per wheel torque control in the quad-motor case, and two wheels of per wheel control plus one of per axle control in the tri-motor case.

Torque vectoring can be even more effective if it is actuated through two electric motor drives located on the same axle, as this configuration can be used for shaping the vehicle understeer characteristic and improving the transient response of the vehicle, The Tesla Cybertruck tri-motor model has one axle with two motors, while the Rivian R1T has two motors on each axle, front and rear.

A special transmission unit was used in the experimental 2014 car MUTE of the Technical University of Munich, where the bigger motor is providing the driving power and the smaller for the torque vectoring functionality. The detailed control system of the torque vectoring is described in the doctoral thesis of Dr.-Ing. Michael Graf.

In case of electric vehicles with four electric motor drives, the same total wheel torque and yaw moment can be generated through a near infinite number of wheel torque distributions. Energy efficiency can be used as a criterion for allocating torque across the wheels. This approach is used in the Rivian R1T light-duty truck introduced in 2021.

=== Rail vehicles ===
Research is taking place into using torque vectoring to actively steer railway wheelsets on the track. Claimed benefits include a drastic reduction of wear on both track and wheel and the opportunity to simplify or even eliminate the mechanically complex, heavy and bulky bogie.

Stored Energy Technology Limited has built and successfully demonstrated their torque vectoring Actiwheel system which employs a wheel hub motor of their own design.

German Aerospace Centre unveiled a full scale mockup of torque vectoring running gear intended for their Next Generation Train at Innotrans 2022.

== See also ==
- Differential steering
