= TR1 =

TR1 may refer to:

- C++ Technical Report 1, a document proposing additions to the C++ Standard Library
- Regency TR-1, an early transistor radio model
- Triumph 20TS, an unsuccessful automobile prototype unofficially called the TR1
- Tomb Raider (1996 video game), the first video game in the Tomb Raider series
- TR-1A or TR-1B, variants of the Lockheed U-2 surveillance aircraft
- Hitachi TR.1
- TR.1, see Orenda Engines
- TR1, a postal district in the TR postcode area
- TAS1R1, a taste receptor
- Tri-R KIS TR-1, an American aircraft design
- Lyulka TR-1, first Soviet turbojet engine
- Tropical Race 1, a strain of Fusarium oxysporum that causes the Panama disease
- Type 1 regulatory T cell (Tr-1), a T-lymphocyte lineage with immunoregulatory function
- Yamaha TR-1 High Output Boating Engine
- VR Class Tr1, a Finnish locomotive class
