= Samsung Wallet =

Digital wallet platform by Samsung

- Developer: Samsung Electronics
- Release: June 24, 2022; 4 years ago
- Operating system: Android; Wear OS (Galaxy Watch6 and later)
- Predecessor: Samsung Pay; Samsung Pass
- Type: Mobile app
- Website: samsung.com/us/samsung-wallet

Samsung Wallet (Korean: 삼성 월렛, or simply Wallet) is a digital wallet platform developed by Samsung. It is available for the Samsung Galaxy-exclusive One UI operating system, and was announced on February 9, 2022, at the February 2022 Galaxy Unpacked event. It combines both Samsung Pay and Samsung Pass.

== History ==
The Samsung Wallet brand name was first used for the company's mobile wallet system of the same name, which was introduced in 2013 before being migrated into a new app called Samsung Pay in 2015. Samsung Wallet now contains the Samsung Pay service for payment cards, alongside other features such as cryptocurrency assets and digital credentials.

== Features ==
Samsung Wallet allows users to store items such as payment cards, loyalty cards, UPI, Digilocker, boarding passes, digital keys, and vaccination cards. It replaces the old Samsung Pay app on Android-powered Galaxy devices and is currently available in Australia, Bahrain, Brazil, Canada, China, Denmark, Finland, France, Germany, Greece, Hong Kong, India, Italy, Kazakhstan, Korea, Kuwait, Malaysia, New Zealand, Norway, Oman, Qatar, Saudi Arabia, Singapore, South Africa, Spain, Sweden, Switzerland, Taiwan, Vietnam, the United Arab Emirates, the United Kingdom, and the United States.

Samsung Wallet also supports a variety of transit cards, such as T-money and cashbee in South Korea, as well as Octopus in Hong Kong. However, due to the region-specific nature of Samsung Wallet, users from other regions are not able to utilize these transit cards from their own devices.

In July 2026, Samsung and Barclays introduced the Samsung Galaxy Card in the United States, Samsung's first co-branded credit card in the country. Issued through the Visa network, the card integrates with Samsung Wallet for applications, account management, spending tracking and rewards redemption. A virtual version is provisioned directly to Samsung Wallet, while a physical card is also available.

=== Comparison between phone and wearable versions ===
Feature	Android	Wear OS	Notes
Pay with EMV payment cards via Samsung Pay	Yes	Yes	
Store government identifications	Yes	Partial	For Wear OS: Only Colorado and Georgia IDs are supported.
Store campus identifications	Yes	Yes	For Android: Campus identifications can still be utilized for up to 24 hours for 15 scans after the device's battery has depleted.
Store transit cards	Yes	Partial	
Store coupons	Yes	Yes	
Store memberships	Yes	Yes	
Store boarding passes	Yes	Yes	
Store digital car keys	Yes	No	For Android: Car keys can still be utilized for up to 24 hours for 15 scans after the device's battery has depleted.
Store digital home keys	Yes	Yes	
Store company identifications	Yes	No	For Android: Company IDs can still be utilized for up to 24 hours for 15 scans after the device's battery has depleted.

=== Fast Mode & Battery depletion ===
As of 2024, car keys, transit cards, campus IDs, and company IDs are supported types of cards that can be used with Fast Mode. However, Samsung limits some passes if they are the same type or from the same issuer from being used with Fast Mode. For example, a user can only have one campus ID and one car key each set to Fast Mode. This can be mitigated in a sense by using a Galaxy Watch to split the Fast Mode passes between multiple devices. Payment cards can also be used without prior authentication on select transit systems, though that mode is called "Tap & Pay."

Fast Mode cards can be used up to five hours via power reserve after the device has powered off due to a drained battery. The ability to retain usage after battery depletion is not available for any Galaxy Watch model.

== Ecosystem ==
Add to Samsung Wallet badge

Samsung Wallet has a passes feature, which exists in a larger ecosystem. Passes are presented in the Menu tab of the app, or can be added to the Quick Access tab. Developers must first be granted access as a Samsung Wallet Partner to the Samsung Wallet Cards API before they can author such items.

An interaction (or transaction) between a pass and a system is facilitated by a 1D or 2D code, although it requires the customer to initiate the activity. Passes can also contain nothing but plain text or an image.

As of June 2022, Samsung Wallet supports memberships (loyalty cards), gift cards, health passes, and boarding passes. Memberships specifically also allow for users to create their own custom pass.

In August 2023, Samsung Wallet came to Wear OS for the first time with the launch of the Galaxy Watch6 with partial functionality of the Android app. Tickets, loyalty cards, gift cards, health passes, and boarding passes were supported at launch. Campus IDs began to be supported in September.

In July 2026, Samsung Wallet began to support third-party NFC-based passes, starting with memberships for Anytime Fitness locations.

In India, Samsung and One97 Communications, the company behind Paytm, have teamed up to provide users of Galaxy smartphones the ability to book movie, event, bus, and aircraft tickets through Samsung Wallet by using the 'Add to Samsung Wallet' feature.

== Availability ==
=== Usage within public transport systems ===
Due to the open nature of the Android platform, some transit cards are only available through other Android-based mobile wallets or via their own apps (e.g. SmarTrip for Google Wallet or TAP for Android). In addition, Samsung Pay does not allow for users in one region to purchase most cards for another. Galaxy devices must be purchased from the region their desired transit card hails, with the exception of Navigo, which is available to purchase from any region Wallet is available in (except India, Mainland China, and South Korea). For public transport systems where transit cards can be used, passengers can ride with Samsung Pay if such transit or payment cards can be added to Samsung Pay. Here are the scenarios where Tap & Pay mode is available.

Country/Region	Scenario	Purchasable outside service region	Wear OS support	Fare Payment Method(s)
Australia	All stations of Transport for NSW	—N/a	—N/a	Debit and credit cards
China mainland	All forms of transit and stores that accept Beijing Transit cards	No	Unknown	Beijing Transit Card
China mainland	All forms of transit that accept Shanghai Transit cards and selected forms of transit that accept China City Union cards	No	Unknown	Shanghai Transit Card
China mainland	All forms of transit that accept China T-Union cards	No	Unknown	Beijing T-Union Transit Card, Changsha Transit Card, Changzhou Transit Card, Dalian Transit Card, Foshan Transit Card, Guangzhou Transit Card, Nanjing Transit Card, Shanghai T-Union Transit Card, Shenzhen Transit Card, Shijiazhuang Transit Card, Suzhou Transit Card, Xiamen Transit Card, Xi'an Transit Card, Xuzhou Transit Card
France	Select forms of transit that accept Navigo	Yes	No	Navigo
Hong Kong	All forms of transit and stores that accept Octopus	No	No	Octopus
Italy	All buses, trams and subway lines into STIBM area (Lombardy), Rome, Naples, Turin and Trieste	—N/a	—N/a	Debit and credit cards (temporary suspended)
Italy	All buses, trams and subway lines into STIBM area (Lombardy), Rome, Naples, Turin and Trieste	—N/a	—N/a	Debit and credit cards (temporary suspended)
Kazakhstan	All buses in Astana	—N/a	—N/a	Debit and credit cards
Russia (suspended)	Select stations of Moscow Metro	No		Troika (previously added cards only, new cards not allowed), debit and credit cards
Singapore	All forms of transit and stores that accept SimplyGo	No	Unknown	SimplyGo, debit and credit cards
South Korea	All forms of transit and stores that accept Cashbee	No	Unknown	Cashbee
South Korea	All forms of transit and stores that accept T-Money	No	Unknown	T-Money
Taiwan	All forms of transit and stores that accept EasyCard	No	Unknown	EasyCard
United Arab Emirates	All forms of transit and stores that accept nol	No	Unknown	nol
United Kingdom	All stations of Transport for London	—N/a	—N/a	Debit and credit cards
United States	All stations of MARTA	Unknown	Unknown	Breeze
United States	All stations of Metropolitan Transportation Authority	—N/a	—N/a	Debit and credit cards
United States	All stations of TriMet	—N/a	—N/a	Debit and credit cards
United States	All stations of Chicago Transit Authority	—N/a	—N/a	Debit and credit cards

In addition to the above scenarios, Samsung Pay can still be used with other non-Tap & Pay readers that accept contactless open loop payment cards, but they will have to be verified beforehand.

==== Upcoming ====
Country/Region	Scenario	Purchasable outside service region	Expected Launch	Fare Payment Method(s)
Japan	All forms of transit and stores that accept Suica	Yes	2027	Suica

=== Supported car & home keys ===
These home locks & car models can be unlocked via NFC with select Galaxy devices running Android 12 & later for car keys, or Android 14 or later for home keys, most notably the Galaxy S20 or later. In addition, certain car models that support operation via UWB (AKA "passive entry") require an UWB compatible device, such as the Galaxy Z Fold2 & later, Galaxy Z TriFold, or Plus/Ultra models of Galaxy S21 & later devices, for enhanced functionality.

=== Supported government-issued credentials ===
==== South Korea ====
13 types of electronic certificates and IDs issued by the Government of South Korea via the Government24 service are supported by Samsung Wallet. These credentials are presented via a QR code.

- Business Registration Certificate
- Certificate Of Graduation From Elementary/Middle School
- Driver's License
- Driving Experience Certificate
- Health Insurance Premium Payment Confirmation
- Health Insurance Qualification Gain/Loss Confirmation
- Health Insurance Qualification Confirmation (Notification)
- National Pension Subscriber Registration Certificate
- National Veteran's Registration Certificate
- Proof Of Income
- Resident Registration Card
- Vaccination Certificate

==== United Arab Emirates ====
These emirates allow their residents to save their government-issued driving licenses and vehicle licenses in Samsung Wallet. These credentials are presented via a PDF417 barcode.

- Dubai

==== United States ====
These territories allow their residents to save their government-issued identification credentials in Samsung Wallet. Once the credential is read, the ID holder must confirm the personal information they wish to share (full name, age, etc.) Users have a choice whether to present via either NFC or QR code. The transmission to the reader device will be completed over BLE after the presentation is fully verified. Credentials can also be utilized in apps or on the web. All IDs are free except those issued by North Dakota, which costs $5 per ID renewal.

- Arizona
- Arkansas
- California
- Colorado
- Georgia
- Iowa
- Maryland
- Montana
- North Dakota
- West Virginia

===== Upcoming =====
- North Carolina

==== Kazakhstan ====
Starting from October 10, 2024, citizens of Kazakhstan can keep their national identity cards in Samsung Wallet. The certificate can be presented in the form of a QR code. The service is offline and works without the Internet.

==== Other non-government issued identifications ====
These are ID passes issued by Samsung & verified by CLEAR that utilize information from an individual's government-issued ID, but the digitized pass itself is not considered to be "government-issued."

Country	Type
United States	Passport

== See also ==
- Google Wallet
- Apple Wallet
