= Apple Wallet =

Digital wallet platform by Apple

- The Wallet app in iOS 15 and watchOS 8
- Other names: Passbook (2012–2015)
- Developer: Apple Inc.
- Operating system: iOS watchOS
- Service name: Apple Wallet (Wallet for short)
- Type: Digital wallet app
- Website: apple.com/wallet

Apple Wallet (or simply Wallet, known as Passbook prior to iOS 9) is a digital wallet developed by Apple Inc. and included with iOS and watchOS that allows users to store Wallet passes such as coupons, boarding passes, student ID cards, government ID cards, business credentials, resort passes, car keys, home keys, event tickets, public transportation passes, store cards, and – starting with iOS 8.1 – credit cards, and debit cards for use via Apple Pay.

== History ==
Apple Passbook was announced at the 2012 Apple Worldwide Developers Conference on June 11, 2012, and released with iOS 6 on September 19, 2012. It was renamed "Apple Wallet" with the release of iOS 9 on September 16, 2015.

== Features ==
Wallet displays Aztec, PDF417, and QR 2D barcodes and Code 128 1D barcodes beginning with iOS 9. Each digital coupon or ticket is known as a "pass". When the user launches Wallet for the first time, a brief introduction screen appears with a button inviting users to browse apps on the App Store with Wallet integration. Passes can also be distributed online via Safari, sent to the user via email, or scanned using the built-in scanner in Wallet.

Passes are synced between iOS devices using iCloud, and OS X 10.8.2 and later also support opening passes to be sent to users' iOS devices. Although the app is available in iOS 6 or later, it is only available on iPhone and iPod Touch, but not on iPad.

Since iOS 16, Wallet has also included the ability to track package deliveries for Apple Pay purchases from selected retailers, providing order details and shipping estimations as well as notifications for order arrivals or updates.

Wallet has the following features:

- Displays 2D barcodes of following types: Aztec, PDF417 and QR.
- Displays 1D barcodes of following types: Code 128 beginning with iOS 9.
- Triggered by location. Up to 10 locations can be added to each Pass. A location is programmed as GPS coordinates (longitude, latitude, and altitude) and/or iBeacon UUID. (The UUID is a Universally Unique Identifier which is a 32 ASCII character code or a code automatically generated from a name using the PassKit API.)
- Triggered by time of pass.
- Localization of the pass. Up to 35 languages can be stored for each pass in Wallet.
- Custom passes can be built by the user in iOS 27.
- Pass changes can be pushed via the Apple Push Notification service by the pass provider, or manually updated by the user themselves.
- Mobile IDs that operate over ISO 18013-5 can be read & logged via third-party apps in iOS 17.
- Recurring payments with Apple Cash in iOS 17.

=== Pass Types ===
Wallet can store a variety of digital passes, from payment and transit cards to access badges and more. Apple categorizes passes/credentials as follows:

==== Payment Card ====
A debit, credit, or prepaid card for making purchases in person, in-app, or online. In-person payments are made using NFC. Most payment cards can be added to both iPhone and Apple Watch.

==== Home Key ====
An access credential provisioned by a consumer-grade smart lock for accessing one's home. Home keys are provisioned to Wallet after adding a compatible smart lock to the Apple Home app. They can be added to both iPhone and Apple Watch. Sharing a home key in Wallet requires adding someone as a Guest in your Apple Home. Unlocking with a home key in Wallet uses NFC (and UWB on supported locks).

Starting with watchOS 27, those you've added as a guest to your Apple Home can add a guest key to their Apple Watch.

==== Car/Scooter Key ====
An access credential issued by an automaker for unlocking and starting your vehicle. Additional functionality can be built into the key depending of the vehicle type and automaker support, such as opening the trunk, starting the climate, or sounding the alarm. Car/scooter keys can be shared with others natively from within Wallet, with specific access limits set, such as unlock only, or unlock and drive. Car/scooter keys can be added to both iPhone and Apple Watch. Unlocking and additional functionality occurs using NFC, UWB, and BLE. Functions such as sounding the alarm and opening the trunk require your device to be within UWB/BLE range of the vehicle, as car/scooter keys in Wallet do not rely on an internet connection to work, with the exception of key sharing.

==== Resident Key ====
An access credential issued by a property manager at a multi-residential property such as an apartment building. The ability to share your digital key with others is determined by the property manager. If sharing is supported, residents can share their key with others natively within Wallet, with the ability to limit guest access to specific days of the week, times of day, or between specified start/end dates. Resident keys work using NFC. An internet connection is not required for locking and unlocking. Key sharing/revocation requires an internet connection.

==== Hotel Key ====
An access credential issues by a hotel brand for accessing its properties, such as hotel rooms, gym, elevators, etc. Depending on the hotel's access control and reservation systems, hotel chains can enable guests to share their key in Wallet with others, such as family members or other individuals they are traveling with or staying at the same hotel with. Hotel keys can be used to access rooms, fitness centers, pools, and other access-control facilities. They use NFC for unlocking and do not require an internet connection, other than for sharing a key or revoking a shared key.

A hotel key in Wallet can work across multiple reservations at various supported properties within the same hotel brand. Upcoming reservations are listed below the key artwork in Wallet, much the way transactions appear under a payment card.

Starting with iOS 27, hotel keys gain additional functionality, such as the ability to see services you've booked with the property.

==== Access Badge ====
An access credential issued by a company or school for workplace or campus access (Apple's marketing refers to this as Employee Badge/Student ID in Wallet). Employee badges and student IDs can be used for accessing facilities and services across a company or school's campus, such as secure workspaces, gyms, printing services, dorms, and more. These badges and IDs work over NFC for unlocking doors, authorizing printers, and more (though a shift to UWB is clearing on the distant horizon).

Student IDs can be tied into not just a school's access control system, but also their payment systems so students, faculty, and staff can pay for meals and snacks from cafeterias and vending machines that tie into the school's payment system using stored-value accounts or "meal swipe" allowances.

==== Government-Issued ID ====
An identity credential/document issued by a government body (such as a state or national agency). IDs in Wallet can be used for proving one's identity as well as a variety of attributes associated with an ID (age, address, name, date of birth, etc). In-person presentation of an ID in Wallet uses NFC to initiate a handshake with the identity reader and establish a connection. Following the handshake, the request for ID information and the return of said requested information is done over BLE. Unlike other passes in Wallet, IDs use NFC only to initiate the connection between device and identity reader.

IDs in Wallet work entirely without an internet connection. Presentment history is stored locally on your device and is not included in iCloud or local backups. When you set up a new device, presentment history does not transfer to the new device. To transfer an ID in Wallet from one device to another, a user must re-verify their identity through a Live Photo and a series of facial movements performed on iPhone and then sent to the ID's issuing authority for approval or denial of re-issuance. Only one Government-Issued ID can be added to an Apple Account. An ID in Wallet can be added to both an iPhone and a paired Apple Watch. In the United States, supported driver's licenses and state IDs are added to Wallet directly within the app.

In Japan, users must add their My Number card from the MynaApp (formerly Mynaportal) app, as direct provisioning within Wallet is not supported. Additionally, Japan's My Number card in Wallet is available on iPhone only–it cannot be added to Apple Watch.

Because Apple's passport-verified Digital ID is not government-issued, it can be added to a device/Apple Account in addition to an existing Government-Issued ID.

==== ID Card ====
An identity credential/document issued by Apple after verifying the information read off of an official government-issued ID. Currently, the only credential classified as an ID Card in Wallet (rather than a Government-Issued ID) is Apple's own Digital ID. Currently available only to US Passport holders, Digital ID in Wallet is issued by Apple after using information from your physical, unexpired US Passport to verify your identity. A user places their iPhone atop the back cover of their US Passport, allowing the device to read information from the Passport's embedded NFC chip. The process also involves scanning the photo page of the Passport to read information off the page's barcode.

Digital ID in Wallet can be used for proving one's identity as well as a variety of attributes associated with a US Passport (age, name, date of birth, country of nationality, etc). In-person presentation of an ID in Wallet uses NFC to initiate a handshake with the identity reader and establish a connection. Following the handshake, the request for ID information and the return of said requested information is done over BLE. Unlike other passes in Wallet, IDs use NFC only to initiate the connection between device and identity reader.

Digital IDs in Wallet work entirely without an internet connection. Presentment history is stored locally on your device and is not included in iCloud or local backups. When you set up a new device, presentment history does not transfer to the new device. To transfer an ID in Wallet from one device to another, a user must re-verify their identity through a Live Photo and a series of facial movements performed on iPhone and then sent to Apple for approval or denial of re-issuance. A Digital ID in Wallet can be added to both an iPhone and a paired Apple Watch.

Because Apple's passport-verified Digital ID is not government-issued, it can be added to a device/Apple Account in addition to an existing Government-Issued ID. While not a REAL ID document, a US Passport meets the security standards to serve as an acceptable alternative to a REAL ID. As such, Digital ID in Wallet can also be used in lieu of a REAL ID.

Currently, Digital ID cannot be used for international travel or border crossings.

==== Transit Card ====
A stored-value payment card issued by a transit system operator for paying transit fares, accessing parking lots, etc. Transit cards in Wallet can support stored monetary value for pay-as-you-go. Starting in May 2024 with Paris' Navigo card, transit cards in Wallet began to support multi-ride and multi-day passes, such as a seven-day commuter pass or a 10-ride pass. Prior to this, passes of any kind other than stored value had to be bought within a transit agency's app and then added to Wallet.

Transit cards can be added to Wallet natively or through a transit agency's app. In cases where the card was added from a transit agency app, features such as automatic or manual reloading of funds must be done through that app. One cannot add a transit card to Wallet from a transit agency app and then top off that card within Wallet. For transit cards added natively from Wallet, users can add funds to their card or buy additional passes directly from within Wallet using Apple Pay.

Transit cards in Wallet use NFC. How one pays for their fare with the transit cards varies by transit system, as some operate on a tap-in, tap-out model, while others use a single tap to pay when boarding the vehicle (train, tram, bus, etc). For example, in Washington, DC, riders must tap their SmarTrip card to enter and exit the Metrorail system, while on Metrobus, riders simply tap once when boarding. In some systems, riders may need to tap the fare reader on the station platform, and then authenticate that they've paid their fare by tapping a handheld reader carried by a member of the train crew.

Depending on the transit system, a transit card in Wallet may also be used to access additional services and facilities operated by the transit agency, such as commuter parking lots and garages, as well as bike storage lockers.

Transit cards in Wallet can be added to both iPhone and Apple Watch, however a single transit card can only exist on one device at a time. Users can easily switch between storing their card on iPhone or Apple Watch. If a user wants a transit card on both devices, they must purchase two separate cards, adding one to iPhone and one to Apple Watch.

=== Express mode and power reserve ===
The first form of Express Mode came under the name "Express Transit" in iOS 12.3. Since then, supported payment cards, as well as some stored-value transport cards (such as Octopus or Suica) could be used to pay for journeys on certain public transport networks without requiring the user to authenticate the payment with Touch ID or Face ID, or even needing to wake the device. Once a supported payment or transit card is selected as a user's Express Transit card, one can simply hold their device near the card reader to authorize payment for the journey.

Since the initial functionality launched, Express Mode has expanded along with the number of card schemes Wallet supports. As of 2023, home keys, transit cards, access badges, campus IDs, hotel keys, and car keys are supported types of cards that can be used with Express Mode. However, Apple limits some passes if they are the same type or from the same issuer from being used with Express Mode. For example, a user can only have one campus ID and one car key each set to Express Mode. This can be mitigated in a sense by using an Apple Watch to split the Express Mode passes between multiple devices. Some cards support grouping to help ease the space that could be taken in the device's secure element. For instance, if a user has multiple home keys linked to Apple Home or multiple hotel rooms at a supported resort, all locks will be valid with a singular pass.

On iPhone XR, iPhone XS, or iPhone SE (2nd generation) and later, Express Mode cards can be used up to five hours via power reserve after the device has powered off due to a drained battery. A low-battery icon will display with "Express Cards Available" text appearing at the bottom of the display, letting users know that Express Mode-enabled cards are still available for usage. Payment cards are only available via power reserve when used for transit transactions. Power reserve functionality is not available for any Apple Watch model as of 2026.

== Ecosystem ==
"Add to Apple Wallet" badge

Passes exist in a larger ecosystem, because passes are created as a package. The package is a pass template, that is created with a pass signer, along with relevant data and a private key. Passes can be updated at any time using the PassKit API and an iOS app can interact directly with passes stored in Wallet.

Passes are presented and managed by Wallet. Systems and apps interact with passes via the PassKit API.

In its simplest form, an interaction (or transaction) between a pass and a system is facilitated by a 2D barcode or the modern QR code although it requires the customer to initiate the activity.

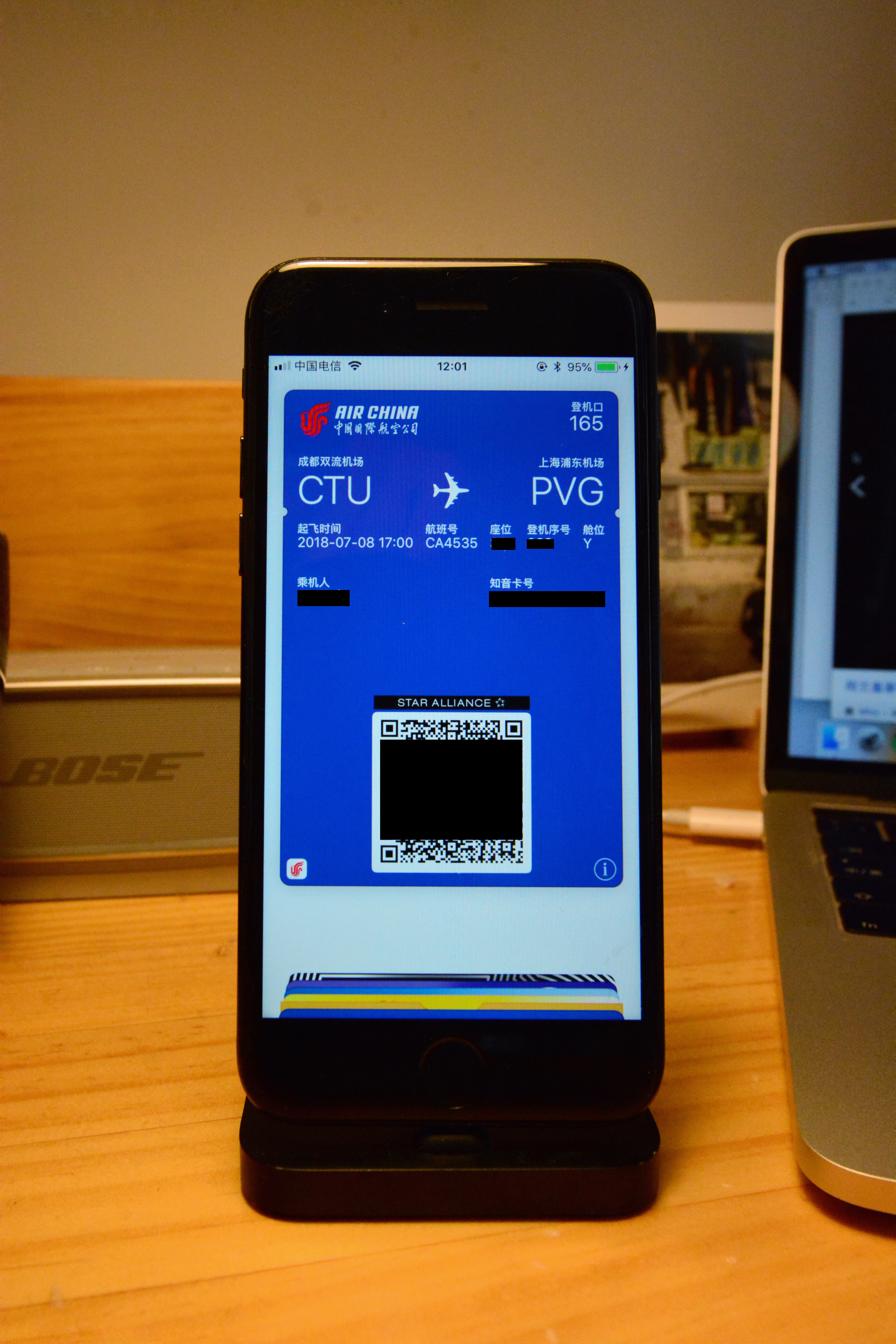
Electronic boarding pass of an Air China flight shown in Apple Wallet on iPhone 7

In late 2014, the first known implementations utilizing the iBeacon wireless Geo-fence started to appear in retail locations in the US. The iBeacon solutions allowed the retailer to broadcast an unsolicited lock-screen notice onto smartphones within Bluetooth range.

In 2015, Apple incorporated the ability to present a loyalty card in Wallet to a Payment terminal via NFC. Walgreens enabled this first with their Balance Rewards loyalty program; customers can add their card to Wallet through the Walgreens or Duane Reade mobile apps and tap their device to the terminal when prompted for their rewards card.

In 2016, Apple released the iPhone 7, along with Apple Pay support in Japan. This included IC e-cards like Suica to also be added digitally onto Apple Wallet. These cards work like a normal IC card, just on the iPhone, and Apple Wallet users can make normal transactions with their IC card using their iPhone, using the FeliCa NFC contactless technology to operate. Apple Wallet users can also reload their IC card just from their device using a debit or credit card added to Apple Wallet. To get a Suica, you could buy one digitally from Apple Wallet, or get a physical one from a JR East station and transfer the card balance to an iPhone. Japan's second main IC card, PASMO, would also be released later in 2020 with support with Apple Wallet.

In 2018, support was added for contactless campus card for select universities. Such credentials operate in a similar manner to physical RFID cards in that they can be tapped to supported readers. The power reserve feature on select iPhones and Apple Watches allows for continued use of the card even when the battery is depleted as long as Express Mode is enabled.

In 2020, car keys were made available for the Apple Wallet, beginning with supported BMW vehicles. Such keys can be shared with friends and family, and permissions can be set per member, such as how fast they can go and whether or not some vehicle-specific features can be enabled/disabled or not. Such passes can also operate over UWB in addition to NFC.

In 2021, Apple announced the ability to store government-issued ID cards, resort passes, home keys, and business credentials in Wallet. As of June 2026, fifteen U.S. States/Territories offer the ability to store a driver's license or state ID within the wallet app. Apple Wallet added support for the Japanese My Number Card in June 2025.

In 2022, Apple announced a new feature to track your Apple Pay orders in Wallet.

== Financial services ==
=== Apple Account ===
Apple Account is a stored value gift card that is issued and managed within Wallet. Users can add balances from iTunes and Apple gift cards for use in physical Apple Stores via Apple Pay or online across Apple's various services and online shop. Available only in the United States, Australia, Canada, Japan and the UK.

=== Apple Card ===
Apple Card is an Apple-branded credit card that is issued and managed within Wallet. The service is currently provided by Goldman Sachs in association with Apple, and Chase will be assuming control by 2028. Users can receive "Daily Cash" when shopping at certain retailers. A digital card is available to be added to Apple Pay for wherever Mastercard cards are accepted online or in-store. A physical card is also available, though it notably lacks an NFC antenna. Available only in the United States.

==== Savings Account ====
Goldman Sachs also offers a savings account to Apple Card holders, with a maximum annual percentage yield of 4.15%. A savings account is not required to utilize Apple Card.

=== Apple Cash ===
Apple Cash is a P2P payment service within Wallet. The service is provided by Green Dot Bank in association with Apple. Users can send and receive funds with others through the Wallet or Messages apps on iOS, watchOS, iPadOS, or macOS, or via tapping another user's iPhone or Apple Watch. A digital card is available to be added to Apple Pay for wherever Visa cards are accepted online or in-store. At launch, this service operated over the Discover Debit network, but has since switched to Visa Debit. Available only in the United States.

=== Apple Pay ===
Apple Pay is a service within Wallet that allows for payments with select banks and card networks. The service is currently available in 97 countries.

=== FinanceKit ===
FinanceKit is an API that allows third party iOS & iPadOS apps to display data from Apple Card, Apple Cash, Savings, and Orders stored in Wallet. Available only to apps that are listed in the American or British App Store.

== Availability ==
The Apple Wallet app is preinstalled on most iPhone and Apple Watch models worldwide, and developers from any country where Apple Developer resources are available can develop passes for Wallet. This is different from Apple Pay, which resides within Wallet, which currently has limited availability to a smaller selection of countries.

=== Region locking ===
These features in Wallet are locked behind a specific region setting of an iOS/watchOS device.

Feature	Country
E-Money (WAON, nanaco)	Japan
Apple Card Family	United States
Apple Cash Family	United States
Select State IDs	United States

=== Supported loyalty programs ===
These programs are conveyed through NFC via Apple Wallet's VAS protocol. Programs that support One Tap are conveyed at the same time as a payment card stored in Apple Wallet. Conversely, Two Tap programs are redeemed in a sequential manner, where a loyalty pass is scanned first, and then the payment can be presented.

Country	Retailer	One Tap/Two Tap
Australia	Dan Murphy's My Dan's	
Australia	Woolworths' Everyday Rewards	Two Tap
Finland	S Group's S-Etukortti	One Tap
France	Carrefour's Carrefour Card	One Tap & Two Tap
Ireland	Nando's Nando Card	Two Tap
Japan	d Point	One Tap & Two Tap
Japan	Ponta	One Tap & Two Tap
United Kingdom	Texaco's Star Rewards	Two Tap
United States	CAVA's CAVA Rewards	One Tap
United States	Coca-Cola's Vending Pass	One Tap
United States	Dave & Buster's Power Card	Two Tap
United States	Jimmy John's Freaky Fast Rewards	One Tap
United States	Maverik's Adventure Club	One Tap
United States	Panera Bread's MyPanera	One Tap
United States	Quiznos' Toasty Points	One Tap
United States	Salsarita's Salsarita Rewards	One Tap
United States	Yogurtland's Real Rewards	One Tap

=== Supported public transport systems ===
For public transport systems where payment cards can be used & Express Mode is supported, passengers can travel with Apple Pay without authenticating each transaction. Transit cards that support direct provisioning can be issued within the Apple Wallet app itself, without needing to download a separate third-party application. Express Transit/Travel mode is available in the following places:

Country/Region	Transport operator/Fare payment system	Express mode with payment card	Transit card support
Australia	All stations and buses of Transport for NSW	Yes	
Belarus	All stations of Minsk Metro	Yes	
Canada	All forms of transit that accept PRESTO except OC Transpo	Yes	Yes
Canada	OC Transpo	Yes	
Canada	All forms of transit that accept the Arc card.	Yes	
Mainland China	All forms of transit and stores that accept Beijing Transit cards (including Yitongxing Miaotong Card)		Yes
Mainland China	All forms of transit that accept Shanghai public transportation cards and selected forms of transit that accept China City Union cards		Yes
Mainland China	All forms of transit that accept China T-Union cards: Changsha, Changzhou, Chaozhou, Chongqing, Dalian, Foshan, Guangzhou Transit Card, Hangzhou, Heyuan, Huizhou, Jiangmen, Jieyang, Jilin, Jinan, Jinhua, Lhasa, Maoming, Nanchang, Nanjing, Ningbo, Qingdao, Shanwei, Shaoguan, Shenzhen Transit Card, Shijiazhuang, Suzhou, Taizhou, Tianjin, Xiamen, Xi'an, Xuzhou, Yunfu, Zhaoqing transit cards.		Yes
Finland	All Föli transit operators	Yes	
France	Occasional travelers that want daily or single ticket with Navigo		Yes
France	TCL	Yes	
Hong Kong	All forms of transit and stores that accept Octopus		Yes
Italy	Autolinee Toscane busses and trams	Yes	
Japan	All forms of transit and stores that accept Suica		Yes
Japan	All forms of transit and stores that accept PASMO		Yes
Japan	All forms of transit and stores that accept ICOCA		Yes
Japan	All forms of transit and stores that accept TOICA		Yes
Saudi Arabia	All stations and buses of Riyadh Metro	Yes	
Serbia	Belgrade city public transport	Yes	
Singapore	All Land Transport Authority public transit operators	Yes	
South Korea	Forms of transit and stores that accept T-Money		Yes
Sweden	All Skånetrafiken city buses	Yes	
United Kingdom	All Arriva UK Bus transit operators	Yes	
United Kingdom	All Greater Manchester transit operators	Yes	
United Kingdom	All Brighton & Hove transit operators	Yes	
United Kingdom	All First Bus Group transit operators	Yes	
United Kingdom	All Metrobus transit operators	Yes	
United Kingdom	All Merseyrail transit operators	Yes	
United Kingdom	All Oxford Bus Company transit operators	Yes	
United Kingdom	All stations and buses of Transport for London	Yes	
United Kingdom	All forms of transit that accept Bee	Yes	
United States	All forms of transit that accept Ventra (direct provisioning not available)	Yes	Yes
United States	All forms of transit that accept TAP	Yes	Yes
United States	All stations of Metropolitan Transportation Authority with OMNY readers	Yes	
United States	SEPTA Bus and Metro lines that accept contactless payments	Yes	
United States	MTS and NCTD busses, trains, and trolleys	Yes	
United States	MBTA bus, subway, and light rail lines that accept contactless payments	Yes	
United States	Forms of transit that accept ORCA.	Partial	Coming soon
United States	All forms of transit that accept Hop Fastpass (direct provisioning not available)	Yes	Yes
United States	All forms of transit that accept Clipper	Partial	Yes
United States	All forms of transit that accept SmarTrip (also U-Pass & Kids Ride Free)	Partial	Yes
United States	All forms of transportation in San Juan, Puerto Rico. AMA Bus and Tren Urbano.	Yes	
United States	All forms of transit that accept Breeze.	Yes	Yes

In addition to the above scenarios, Apple Pay can still be used with other non-Express Transit/Travel readers that accept contactless open loop payment cards, but they will have to be verified beforehand.

==== Upcoming ====
Country	Scenario	Fare payment method(s)
Canada	Forms of transit that accept OPUS	OPUS
United States	Forms of transit that accept ORCA	ORCA
United States	Forms of transit that accept Charlie	Charlie

=== Supported government-issued identifications ===
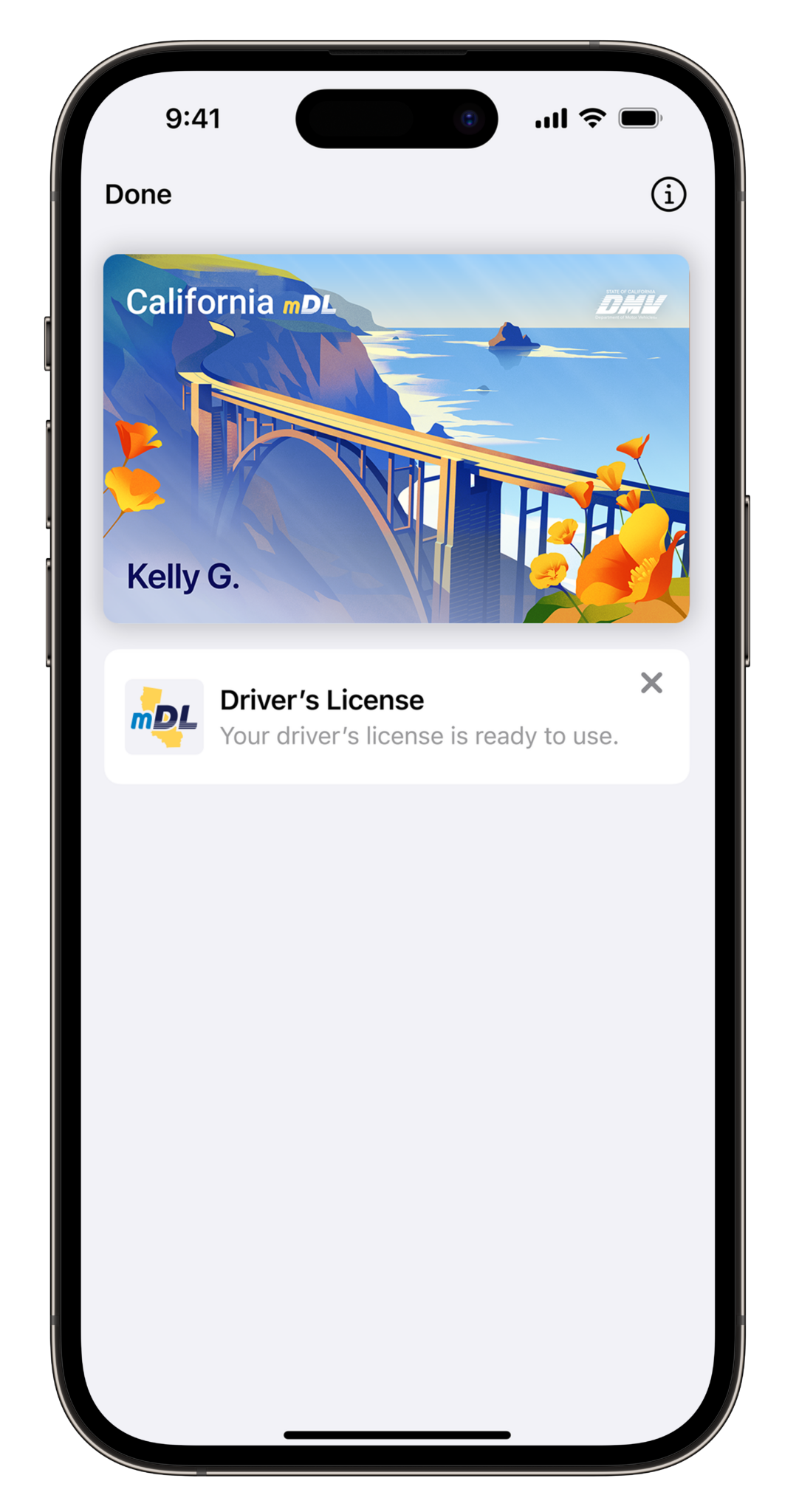
California mDL in Apple Wallet

These territories permit their residents to save their government-issued identification credentials in Apple Wallet. In regards to American IDs, unlike the equivalent physical credentials, mobile government IDs in Apple Wallet can only be presented using NFC, so no barcode is scanned when presenting. Mobile IDs in Apple Wallet operate over the ISO 18013-5 or ISO 23220 mobile personal identification standards. Once the credential is read, the ID holder must confirm the personal information they wish to share (full name, age, etc.) The transmission to the reader device will be completed over BLE after the presentation is fully verified. Added credentials can also be requested by apps to present virtually. Available for iPhone 8 or later, and Apple Watch Series 4 or later. All IDs are free of cost except those of North Dakota, which costs $5 per ID renewal.

For Japanese IDs to be added, the Mynaportal app must be installed for provisioning to Wallet. Integration with Wallet for watchOS is not supported currently. Available for iPhone XR/XS/SE (2nd generation) or later, with iOS 18.5 or later.

Country/Region	Type	Area	Launch date
Japan	ID	Countrywide	24 June 2025
United States	ID	Arizona	23 March 2022
United States	ID	Arkansas	27 May 2026
United States	ID	California	19 September 2024
United States	ID	Colorado	9 November 2022
United States	ID	Georgia	18 May 2023
United States	ID	Hawaii	28 August 2024
United States	ID	Illinois	18 November 2025
United States	ID	Iowa	23 October 2024
United States	ID	Maryland	26 May 2022
United States	ID	Montana	19 Aug 2025
United States	ID	New Mexico	5 December 2024
United States	ID	North Dakota	30 September 2025
United States	ID	Ohio	1 August 2024
United States	ID	Oklahoma	2 September 2026
United States	ID	Puerto Rico	12 December 2024
United States	ID	Virginia	26 August 2026
United States	ID	West Virginia	23 October 2025

==== Partially supported ====
Country	State/Territory	Launch date	Notes
Greece	Countrywide	July 2022	Issued in a normal .pkpass format with a barcode for verification. ISO 18013-5 non-compliant.
UAE	Countrywide	2024	Issued in a normal .pkpass format with a barcode for verification. ISO 18013-5 non-compliant. Available through the UAE ICP App.

==== Upcoming ====
Country	State/Territory	Estimated Launch	Type
United States	Connecticut	Unknown	Driver's license/State ID
United States	Kentucky	Unknown	Driver's license/State ID
United States	Mississippi	Unknown	Driver's license/State ID
United States	North Carolina	2027	Driver's license/State ID
United States	Utah	Unknown	Driver's license/State ID

==== Other non-government issued identifications ====
These are digital IDs issued by Apple that utilize information from an individual's government-issued ID, but the digitized pass itself is not considered to be "government-issued."

Country	Type
United States	Passport

==== Businesses supporting IDs in Wallet ====
A growing number of businesses, organizations, and government services support ID cards stored in Apple Wallet. These integrations allow users to verify their identity, age, or eligibility using a driver's license, state ID, passport, or national ID card added to Wallet through the Digital Credentials API (for online verification), the Verify with Wallet API (for in-app verification), the ID Verifier API (for in-person presentment using an iPhone as an ID reader), or other related identity verification systems.

Business	Presentment	Use case	ID Type
Turo	In-app & Online	Driver identity verification for vehicle rentals and account verification.	mDL
Uber Eats	In-app & Online	Age and identity verification for ordering age-restricted items (such as alcohol).	mDL
Chime	Online	Support announced (but launch unconfirmed).	mDL
Arizona Department of Transportation	In-person	Identity verification at DMV check-in kiosks.	mDL
TSA	In-person	Identity verification at TSA checkpoints with CAT-2 or newer identity readers.	mDL & Digital ID
Maryland Motor Vehicle Administration	Online	Identity verification for account verification and unlocking additional online services.	mDL
Apple Stores	In-person	Identity verification for order pickups (and maybe repair pickups).	mDL
Virginia State Police	In-person	Officers are equipped with the necessary hardware to read ISO 18013-5 compliant mDLs for traffic stops.	mDL
United Airlines	In-app	Identity verification when enrolling in TSA PreCheck Touchless ID.	Digital ID

Wordmark for the Apple Wallet application

=== Supported digital keys ===
These home locks, vehicle models, hotel rooms, and more can be unlocked via NFC with the iPhone XR, iPhone XS or later, and Apple Watch Series 5 or later. In addition, certain locks and car models that support operation via UWB (AKA "passive entry") require an UWB compatible device (such as the iPhone 11 or later or the Apple Watch Series 6 or later) for enhanced functionality.
