= Lingnan Pass =

Smart card system in Guangdong, China

- Location: Guangdong, China
- Launched: November 8, 2010
- Manager: Guangdong Lingnan Pass Co., Ltd
- Currency: CNY
- Credit expiry: None
- Auto recharge: Automatic Add Value Service
- Website: www.lingnanpass.com

Lingnan Pass (Chinese: 岭南通; Jyutping: ling5 naam4 tung1; pinyin: Lǐng nán tōng) is a contactless rechargeable stored value smartcard system in Guangdong Province.

== History ==
"Lingnan Pass Card" is supervised by the Guangdong Provincial Committee of the Chinese Communist Party, deployed by the Guangdong Provincial Department of Transportation, and issued by Guangdong Lingnan Pass Co., Ltd. in conjunction with operating entities in various cities. It is a transportation stored value card that can be used in 21 cities in Guangdong Province, China.

Lingnan Pass Card is issued under a dual-brand strategy, of which "Lingnan Pass" is the main brand and other brand with "Tong (通)" is a sub-brand for local city. The application areas of Lingnantong include public transportation such as buses, subways, public bicycles, roadside meters, parking lots and highways, and have been expanded to chain convenience stores, supermarkets, vending machines, vegetable markets and fast food restaurants, etc. Libraries, entry and exit payment and other public management services.

Lingnan Pass is developed based on Yang Cheng Tong, so for compatibility, most of Lingnan Pass's trading systems still retain the ability to read and write the account files of Yang Cheng Tong cards, and only close the old account files on the card after recharging offline, and transfer the data to the new Lingnan Pass account file, so that it can be used on all Lingnan Pass trading systems (such as EFTPOS on public bus in Shenzhen and Dongguan).

Lingnan Pass is also one of the members of China T-union. The Lingnan Pass card that supports China T-union payment function can be used to pay on the transaction system that supports China T-union in other cities in China; similarly, China T-union cards of other cities can also be consumed on Lingnan Pass transaction system that supports this system.

Lingnan Tong has also issued co-issued cards with Octopus, Macau Pass, and EZ-Link, but the internal account documents and amounts are not interoperable.

Yang Cheng Tong was rebranded in November 2010 as a type of Lingnan Pass and rebranded as "Lingnan Pass·Yang Cheng Tong". Existing cards were automatically upgraded and need not be replaced.

== See also ==
- Yang Cheng Tong
