= List of digital keys in mobile wallets =

Digital keys that operate over NFC and/or UWB are compatible with a variety of mobile wallets. These digital keys can be stored in smart devices through the use of mobile wallets that have access to the device's embedded secure element, such as Google Wallet for Android & Wear OS, Samsung Wallet for Android, Huawei Wallet for HarmonyOS, or Apple Wallet for iOS & watchOS.

In some regions, both Huawei Wallet and Samsung Wallet allow for emulation of unencrypted physical NFC tags. However, these emulated passes must be viewed in their respective Wallet apps before the device is tapped to transmit properly, unlike digital keys that are properly developed for such platforms.

The following is a list of digital keys and for what mobile wallets they are available.

== Vehicles ==
The Car Connectivity Consortium's (CCC) Digital Key logo. A manufacturer displaying the CCC Digital Key mark indicates that they allow at least one of their vehicles to have its keys added to a mobile wallet.

The digital key specification for cars is maintained by the Car Connectivity Consortium. The first automobile to follow the Digital Key 3.0 standard was the BMW iX. Manufacturers can set limits on how many devices a key can be shared with. For instance, Kia only allows 15, while Mercedes-Benz permits up to 32.

Some vehicles may need software or hardware upgrades to support a specific digital wallet. Also, not all trims for these listed models have the necessary hardware to support digital keys.

Make	Model	Year	NFC/UWB	Google Wallet	Samsung Wallet	Huawei Wallet	Apple Wallet
AITO	M5	2022	NFC	No	No	Yes	No
Audi	A5	2025-	NFC & UWB	Yes	Yes	Unknown	Yes
Audi	A6 e-tron	2025-	NFC & UWB	Yes	Yes	Unknown	Yes
Audi	A7	2025-	NFC & UWB	Yes	Yes	Unknown	Yes
Audi	Q5	2025-	NFC & UWB	Yes	Yes	Unknown	Yes
Audi	Q6 e-tron	2025-	NFC & UWB	Yes	Yes	Unknown	Yes
Audi	S5	2025-	NFC & UWB	Yes	Yes	Unknown	Yes
BMW	1	2021-	NFC	Yes	Yes	No	Yes
BMW	2	2021-	NFC	Yes	Yes	No	Yes
BMW	3	2021–2022	NFC	Yes	Yes	No	Yes
BMW	3	2023-	NFC & UWB	Yes	Yes	No	Yes
BMW	4	2021–2023	NFC	Yes	Yes	No	Yes
BMW	4	2024-	NFC & UWB	Yes	Yes	No	Yes
BMW	5	2021–2023	NFC	Yes	Yes	No	Yes
BMW	5	2024-	NFC & UWB	Yes	Yes	No	Yes
BMW	6	2021-	NFC	Yes	Yes	No	Yes
BMW	7	2023-	NFC & UWB	Yes	Yes	No	Yes
BMW	8	2021-	NFC	Yes	Yes	No	Yes
BMW	M3	2021-	NFC	Yes	Yes	No	Yes
BMW	M4	2021-	NFC	Yes	Yes	No	Yes
BMW	M5	2021-	NFC	Yes	Yes	No	Yes
BMW	M8	2021-	NFC	Yes	Yes	No	Yes
BMW	X1	2023-	NFC & UWB	Yes	Yes	No	Yes
BMW	X2	2024-	NFC & UWB	Yes	Yes	No	Yes
BMW	X3	2022-	NFC & UWB	Yes	Yes	No	Yes
BMW	X4	2022-	NFC & UWB	Yes	Yes	No	Yes
BMW	X5	2021–2023	NFC	Yes	Yes	No	Yes
BMW	X5	2024-	NFC & UWB	Yes	Yes	No	Yes
BMW	X6	2021–2023	NFC	Yes	Yes	No	Yes
BMW	X6	2024-	NFC & UWB	Yes	Yes	No	Yes
BMW	X7	2021–2022	NFC	Yes	Yes	No	Yes
BMW	X7	2023-	NFC & UWB	Yes	Yes	No	Yes
BMW	X5 M	2021-	NFC	Yes	Yes	No	Yes
BMW	X6 M	2021-	NFC	Yes	Yes	No	Yes
BMW	XM	2023-	NFC & UWB	Yes	Yes	No	Yes
BMW	Z4	2021-	NFC	Yes	Yes	No	Yes
BMW	i4	2022-	NFC & UWB	Yes	Yes	No	Yes
BMW	i5	2024-	NFC & UWB	Yes	Yes	No	Yes
BMW	i7	2023-	NFC & UWB	Yes	Yes	No	Yes
BMW	iX	2022-	NFC & UWB	Yes	Yes	No	Yes
BMW	iX1	2023-	NFC & UWB	Yes	Yes	No	Yes
BMW	iX3	2022-	NFC	Yes	Yes	No	Yes
BYD	Dolphin	2023-	NFC	No	No	Yes	Yes
BYD	e2	2021-	NFC	No	No	Yes	No
BYD	e3	2023-	NFC	No	No	Yes	No
BYD	Frigate 07	2022-	NFC	No	No	Yes	Yes
BYD	Han	2022-	NFC	No	No	Yes	Yes
BYD	M6 (2024)	2024-	NFC	Yes	Yes	Unknown	Yes
BYD	Qin	2022-	NFC	No	No	Yes	No
BYD	Seal	?	NFC	Yes	Yes	Yes	Yes
BYD	Sealion 6	2024-	NFC	Yes	Yes	Yes	Yes
BYD	Shark	2024-	NFC	Yes	Yes	Unknown	Yes
BYD	Song	2022-	NFC	No	No	Yes	No
BYD	Tang	2022-	NFC	No	No	Yes	No
BYD	Yuan	2022-	NFC	No	No	Yes	No
Cadillac	Lyriq	2025-	NFC & UWB*	Yes	Yes	No	Yes
Cadillac	Optiq	2026-	NFC & UWB*	Yes	Yes	No	Yes
Cupra	Born	2026-	NFC & UWB	Yes	Yes	Unknown	Unknown
Cupra	Raval	2026-	NFC & UWB	Yes	Yes	Unknown	Unknown
Cupra	Tavascan	2026-	NFC & UWB	Yes	Yes	Unknown	Unknown
Denza	D9 EV	2024-	?	Yes	Yes	Unknown	Unknown
Exeed	ES	2024-	?	Unknown	Unknown	Unknown	Yes
Exeed	ET	2024-	?	Unknown	Unknown	Unknown	Yes
Genesis	GV60	2022-	NFC & UWB	Yes	Yes	No	Yes
Genesis	G70	2023-	NFC	Yes	Yes	No	Yes
Genesis	G70 (Sport Prestige, Sport Advanced, Sport Prestige)	2026-	NFC & UWB	Yes	Yes	No	Yes
Genesis	GV70	2024-	NFC & UWB	Yes	Yes	No	Yes
Genesis	G80	2024-	NFC & UWB	Yes	Yes	No	Yes
Genesis	GV80	2024-	NFC & UWB	Yes	Yes	No	Yes
Genesis	G90	2022-	NFC & UWB	Yes	Yes	No	Yes
Gogoro	2 Series		NFC	No	No	No	Yes
Gogoro	CrossOver		NFC	No	No	No	Yes
Gogoro	Delight		NFC	No	No	No	Yes
Gogoro	Pulse		NFC	No	No	No	Yes
Gogoro	S1		NFC	No	No	No	Yes
Gogoro	SuperSport		NFC	No	No	No	Yes
Gogoro	VIVA MIX		NFC	No	No	No	Yes
Gogoro	VIVA XL		NFC	No	No	No	Yes
Hyundai	Azera	2023-	NFC & UWB	Yes	Yes	No	Yes
Hyundai	Elantra	2024-	NFC	Yes	Yes	No	Yes
Hyundai	Elexio	2026-	NFC & UWB	Yes	Yes	No	Yes
Hyundai	Ioniq 5 N	2025-	NFC & UWB	Yes	Yes	No	Yes
Hyundai	Ioniq 6	2023-	NFC	Yes	Yes	No	Yes
Hyundai	Ioniq 9	2026-	NFC & UWB	Yes	Yes	No	Yes
Hyundai	Kona	2023-	NFC	Yes	Yes	No	Yes
Hyundai	Palisade	2023-	NFC	Yes	Yes	No	Yes
Hyundai	Palisade	2026-	NFC & UWB	Yes	Yes	No	Yes
Hyundai	Santa Cruz	2025-	NFC	Yes	Yes	No	Yes
Hyundai	Santa Fe	2024-	NFC & UWB	Yes	Yes	No	Yes
Hyundai	Sonata	2024-	NFC & UWB	Yes	Yes	No	Yes
Hyundai	Staria	2027-	NFC & UWB	Yes	Yes	No	Yes
Hyundai	Tucson	2025-	NFC & UWB	Yes	Yes	No	Yes
Kia	EV2	2026-	NFC & UWB	Yes	Yes	No	Yes
Kia	EV3	2026-	NFC & UWB	Yes	Yes	No	Yes
Kia	EV4	2026-	NFC & UWB	Yes	Yes	No	Yes
Kia	EV5	2024-	NFC & UWB	Yes	Yes	No	Yes
Kia	EV6	2025-	NFC & UWB	Yes	Yes	No	Yes
Kia	EV9	2024-	NFC & UWB	Yes	Yes	No	Yes
Kia	K4	2025-	NFC & UWB	Yes	Yes	No	Yes
Kia	K5	2025-	NFC & UWB	Yes	Yes	No	Yes
Kia	Nexo	2026	NFC & UWB	Yes	Yes	No	Yes
Kia	Niro	2023-	NFC	Yes	Yes	No	Yes
Kia	Sedona (Carnival)	2025-	NFC & UWB	Yes	Yes	No	Yes
Kia	Seltos	2023-	NFC	Yes	Yes	No	Yes
Kia	Sorento	2024-	NFC & UWB	Yes	Yes	No	Yes
Kia	Sorento HEV/PHEV	2025-	NFC & UWB	Yes	Yes	No	Yes
Kia	Sportage	2026-	NFC & UWB	Yes	Yes	No	Yes
Kia	Stonic	2026-	NFC & UWB	Yes	Yes	No	Yes
Kia	Telluride	2023-25	NFC	Yes	Yes	No	Yes
Kia	Telluride	2027-	NFC & UWB	Yes	Yes	No	Yes
Lexus	ES	2026-	NFC & UWB	Yes	Yes	No	Yes
Lexus	TZ	2027-	NFC & UWB	Yes	Yes	No	Yes
Lotus	Eletre	2025-	NFC & UWB	Unknown	Unknown	Unknown	Yes
Lotus	Emeya	2024-	NFC & UWB	Unknown	Unknown	Unknown	Yes
Mahindra	BE 6	2024-	NFC	Unknown	Yes	Unknown	Unknown
Mahindra	XEV 9e	2025-	NFC	Unknown	Yes	Unknown	Unknown
Mercedes-Benz	CLA	2026-	NFC & UWB*	Yes	Yes	No	Yes
Mercedes-Benz	CLE	2025-	NFC & UWB*	Yes	Yes	No	Yes
Mercedes-Benz	E-Class	2024-	NFC & UWB*	Yes	Yes	No	Yes
Mercedes-Benz	EQE	2025-	NFC & UWB*	Yes	Yes	No	Yes
Mercedes-Benz	EQE SUV	2025-	NFC & UWB*	Yes	Yes	No	Yes
Mercedes-Benz	EQS	2025-	NFC & UWB*	Yes	Yes	No	Yes
Mercedes-Benz	EQS SUV	2024-	NFC & UWB*	Yes	Yes	No	Yes
Mercedes-Benz	GLC	2025-	NFC & UWB*	Yes	Yes	No	Yes
Mercedes-Benz	S-Class	2025-	NFC & UWB*	Yes	Yes	No	Yes
Mercedes-Benz	C-Class	2025-	NFC & UWB*	Yes	Yes	No	Yes
Mercedes-Benz	GT Coupe	2024-	NFC & UWB*	Yes	Yes	No	Yes
Mercedes-Benz	SL (R232)	2024-	NFC & UWB*	Yes	Yes	No	Yes
Mini	Aceman	2025-	NFC & UWB	Yes	Yes	No	Yes
Mini	Countryman	2025-	NFC & UWB	Yes	Yes	No	Yes
Mini	Cooper	2025-	NFC & UWB	Yes	Yes	No	Yes
Mini	Cooper Convertible	2024-2025	NFC	Yes	Yes	No	Yes
Mini	Cooper Convertible	2026-	NFC & UWB	Yes	Yes	No	Yes
Nio	EC6	?	NFC & UWB	No	No	No	Yes
Nio	ES6	?	NFC & UWB	No	No	No	Yes
Nio	ET5	?	NFC & UWB	No	No	No	Yes
Nio	ET5T	?	NFC & UWB	No	No	No	Yes
Nio	ET9	?	NFC & UWB	Unknown	Unknown	Unknown	Yes
NIU	NQiX		NFC	No	No	No	Yes
Polestar	3	2025-	NFC & UWB	Yes	Yes	No	Yes
Polestar	4	2025-	NFC & UWB	Yes	Yes	No	Yes
Porsche	Cayenne Electric	2026-	NFC & UWB	Yes	Yes	Unknown	Yes
Porsche	Macan Electric	2026-	NFC & UWB	Yes	Yes	Unknown	Yes
Ram	1500 Ramcharger	2025-	NFC & UWB	Yes	Yes	No	Yes
Rivian	R1S	2025-	NFC & UWB	Yes	Yes	No	Yes
Rivian	R1T	2025-	NFC & UWB	Yes	Yes	No	Yes
Škoda	Elroq	2026-	NFC & UWB	Yes	Yes	No	Yes
Škoda	Enyaq	2026-	NFC & UWB	Yes	Yes	No	Yes
Škoda	Epiq	2026-	NFC & UWB	Unknown	Unknown	Unknown	Yes
Škoda	Peaq	2026-	NFC & UWB	Yes	Yes	No	Yes
Smart	#5	?	NFC & UWB	No	No	No	Yes
Volkswagen	ID.3neo	2026-	NFC & UWB	Unknown	Yes	Unknown	Unknown
Volkswagen	ID.4	2026-	NFC & UWB	Unknown	Yes	Unknown	Unknown
Volkswagen	ID.5	2026-	NFC & UWB	Unknown	Yes	Unknown	Unknown
Volkswagen	ID.7	2026-	NFC & UWB	Unknown	Yes	Unknown	Unknown
Volkswagen	ID.Buzz	2026-	NFC & UWB		Yes		
Volkswagen	ID.Cross	2026-	NFC & UWB		Yes		
Volkswagen	ID.Polo	2026-	NFC & UWB		Yes		
Volvo	EM90	2025-	NFC & UWB	Yes	Yes	No	Yes
Volvo	ES90	2025-	NFC & UWB	Yes	Yes	No	Yes
Volvo	EX30	2024-	NFC & UWB	Yes	Yes	No	Yes
Volvo	EX60	2026-	NFC & UWB	Yes	Yes	No	Yes
Volvo	EX90	2025-	NFC & UWB	Yes	Yes	No	Yes
Toyota	RAV4	2026-	NFC & UWB	Yes	Yes	Unknown	Yes
Yangwang	U7	2025-	NFC & UWB	Yes	Unknown	Unknown	Unknown
Zeekr	009	?	NFC & UWB	Coming soon	Coming soon		Yes
Zeekr	7X	?	NFC & UWB	No	No	No	Yes
Zeekr	7GT	?	NFC & UWB	No	No	No	Yes
Zeekr	X	?	NFC & UWB	No	No	No	Yes

* = While key can function in NFC mode, the manufacturer disallows devices without UWB from being able to add the key.

Keys that are compatible with Google Wallet, Samsung Wallet, and Apple Wallet can be shared across platforms.

Google Wallet, Samsung Wallet, and Apple Wallet are capable of the following remote commands for supported vehicles: unlocking, locking, climate controls, sounding the horn, and opening/closing the trunk.

== Locks and external readers ==
The Connectivity Standards Alliance's logo for Aliro. Locks and other access control readers that bear this symbol are compatible with the standard.

In 2023, a new communication protocol named Aliro was announced by the Connectivity Standards Alliance to promote interoperability between smartphones, smartwatches, and access control readers, and guarantees improved availability for digital keys for locks across the major mobile wallets. Google, Samsung, and Apple have all been announced as participating members. The standard launched on February 26, 2026.

Brand	Model	Aliro	NFC/UWB	Google Wallet*	Samsung Wallet	Huawei Wallet	Apple Wallet
Aqara	A100	No	NFC	No	No	No	Yes
Aqara	D100	No	NFC	No	No	No	Yes
Aqara	J200	No	NFC	No	No	No	Yes
Aqara	U100	No	NFC	No	No	No	Yes
Aqara	U200	No	NFC	No	No	No	Yes
Aqara	U300	No	NFC	No	No	No	Yes
Aqara	U400	Yes	NFC & UWB	Yes	NFC only	Unknown	Yes
Aqara	U500 Series	Yes	NFC	Coming soon	Yes	No	Yes
Arre	Smart Lock	No	NFC	No	No	No	Yes
Avia	Aurora	Yes	UWB	Unknown	Unknown	Unknown	Unknown
Avia	Deadbolt+	No	NFC	No	No	No	Yes
Bida	I7	No	NFC	No	No	Yes	No
Deschmann	T11 Pro	No	NFC	No	No	Yes	No
Durin	Door Manager	Yes	NFC & UWB	Yes	Unknown	Unknown	Unknown
Highland Barley	E5H	No	NFC	No	No	Yes	No
Highland Barley	T7	No	NFC	No	No	Yes	No
Highland Barley	Q7	No	NFC	No	No	Yes	No
Huawei	Smart Lock	No	NFC	No	No	Yes	No
Huawei	Smart Lock Pro	No	NFC	No	No	Yes	No
Huawei	Smart Lock SE	No	NFC	No	No	Yes	No
Kwikset	Select Plus	No	NFC	No	No	No	Yes
Level	Lock+	No	NFC	No	No	No	Yes
Level	Lock Pro	No	NFC	No	No	No	Yes
LG	Smart Deadbolt Lock	Yes	NFC & UWB	Unknown	Unknown	Unknown	Yes
Lockly	PIN Genie Pro	No	NFC	No	No	No	Yes
Lockly	Secure Pro	No	NFC	No	No	No	Yes
Lockly	Secure Pro with Ultra-Wideband		UWB	Unknown	Unknown	Unknown	Unknown
Lockly	Secure Pro with Ultra-Wideband		NFC	Unknown	Unknown	No	Yes
Lockly	Visage	No	NFC	No	No	No	Yes
Lockly	Vision	No	NFC	No	No	No	Yes
Lockly	Vision Prestige		NFC	No	No	No	Yes
Nuki	Keypad 2 NFC	Yes	NFC	Yes	Yes	Unknown	Yes
Oribo	C1	No	NFC	No	No	Yes	No
Pinduo	H1	No	NFC	No	No	Yes	No
Schlage	Encode Plus	No	NFC	No	No	No	Yes
Schlage	Sense Pro	Yes	NFC & UWB	NFC only	Coming soon	No	Yes
Thorbolt	X1	No	NFC	No	No	No	Yes
TP-Link	Smart Video Door Lock	No	NFC	No	No	No	Yes
Ultraloq	Bolt NFC	No	NFC	No	No	No	Yes
Ultraloq	Bolt Pro	Yes	NFC	Yes	Yes	Unknown	Yes
Ultraloq	Latch 3	Yes	NFC	No	Yes	No	Yes
Ultraloq	Latch 5 Fingerprint	No	NFC	No	No	No	Yes
Ultraloq	Latch 5 Pro	Yes	NFC	Yes	Yes	Unknown	Yes
Ultraloq	Latch 7	Yes	NFC	Yes	Yes	Unknown	Yes
Ultraloq	Latch 7 Pro	Yes	NFC & UWB	Yes	Yes	Unknown	Yes
VOC	X8	No	NFC	No	No	Yes	No
Yale	Assure Lock 2 Plus	No	NFC	No	No	No	Yes
Zigbang	SHP-R80	No	NFC & UWB	No	Yes	No	No

* = Not available for Wear OS

== Hospitality and entertainment ==
Businesses can set limits on how many devices a key can be shared with. For instance, Hyatt only allows one smartphone and one smartwatch, Lore Group allows two each, and Hotel June allows up to four.

Brand	Property	NFC/UWB/BLE	Google Wallet	Samsung Wallet	Huawei Wallet	Apple Wallet	Notes
Ace Hotel	Brooklyn	NFC	No	No	No	Yes	
Amber Hotels	Amber Hotel Dongguan (Building 2)	NFC	No	No	Yes	No	
Amber Hotels	Amber Hotel Hangzhou	NFC	No	No	Yes	No	
Amber Hotels	Amber Hotel Xi'an	NFC	No	No	Yes	No	
B's Holding B.V.	Cityhotel Wood	NFC	Yes	No	No	Yes	
B's Holding B.V.	Duinhotel Tien Torens	NFC	Yes	No	No	Yes	
B's Holding B.V.	Hotel Copper	NFC	Yes	No	No	Yes	
B's Holding B.V.	Strandhotel Zoutelande	NFC	Yes	No	No	Yes	
Caesars Entertainment	Harrah's Las Vegas	NFC	Unknown	Unknown	Unknown	Yes	
Club Quarters	All Properties	NFC	Yes	No	No	Yes	
EasyHotel	London City Shoreditch	NFC	No	No	No	Yes	
EasyHotel	Paris Aubervilliers	NFC	No	No	No	Yes	
Disney	Walt Disney World Resort	NFC*	Yes	No	No	Yes	Does not function for room access at on-property hotels.
Google	Bay View Suites	BLE	Yes	No	No	No	
Hey Lou Hotels	Hey Lou Hotel Karlsruhe Messe	NFC	Yes	No	No	Yes	
Hotel June	Malibu	NFC	Yes	No	No	Yes	
Hyatt	Various	NFC	No	No	No	Yes	At select hotels only.
Lore Group	Lyle Washington DC	NFC	Yes	No	No	Yes	
Lore Group	Pulitzer Amsterdam	NFC	Yes	No	No	Yes	
Lore Group	Riggs Washington DC	NFC	Yes	No	No	Yes	
Lore Group	Sea Containers London	NFC	Yes	No	No	Yes	
Mitsui Garden Hotels	Ginza Premier	NFC	No	No	No	Yes	
Mitsui Garden Hotels	Sequence Miyashita Park	NFC	No	No	No	Yes	
Mitsui Garden Hotels	Sequence SUIDOBASHI	NFC	No	No	No	Yes	
OREA	Place Seno	NFC	data-sort-value="Yes" style="background: #DFD; color:black; vertical-align: middle; text-align: center; " class="table-yes2 skin-invert" | Yes	data-sort-value="No" style="background: #FFE3E3; color:black; vertical-align: middle; text-align: center; " class="skin-invert table-no2" | No	data-sort-value="No" style="background: #FFE3E3; color:black; vertical-align: middle; text-align: center; " class="skin-invert table-no2" | No	data-sort-value="Yes" style="background: #DFD; color:black; vertical-align: middle; text-align: center; " class="table-yes2 skin-invert" | Yes	
OREA	Resort Sklar	NFC	data-sort-value="Yes" style="background: #DFD; color:black; vertical-align: middle; text-align: center; " class="table-yes2 skin-invert" | Yes	data-sort-value="No" style="background: #FFE3E3; color:black; vertical-align: middle; text-align: center; " class="skin-invert table-no2" | No	data-sort-value="No" style="background: #FFE3E3; color:black; vertical-align: middle; text-align: center; " class="skin-invert table-no2" | No	data-sort-value="Yes" style="background: #DFD; color:black; vertical-align: middle; text-align: center; " class="table-yes2 skin-invert" | Yes	
Oslofjord Convention Center	Oslofjord Hotel	NFC	Yes	No	No	Yes	Only for use at hotel suites. Cabins and apartments do not yet support room key in digital wallets.
Premier Inn	Birmingham NEC	NFC	data-sort-value="Yes" style="background: #DFD; color:black; vertical-align: middle; text-align: center; " class="table-yes2 skin-invert" | Yes	data-sort-value="No" style="background: #FFE3E3; color:black; vertical-align: middle; text-align: center; " class="skin-invert table-no2" | No	data-sort-value="No" style="background: #FFE3E3; color:black; vertical-align: middle; text-align: center; " class="skin-invert table-no2" | No	data-sort-value="Yes" style="background: #DFD; color:black; vertical-align: middle; text-align: center; " class="table-yes2 skin-invert" | Yes	
Premier Inn	Hub London Farringdon	NFC	data-sort-value="Yes" style="background: #DFD; color:black; vertical-align: middle; text-align: center; " class="table-yes2 skin-invert" | Yes	data-sort-value="No" style="background: #FFE3E3; color:black; vertical-align: middle; text-align: center; " class="skin-invert table-no2" | No	data-sort-value="No" style="background: #FFE3E3; color:black; vertical-align: middle; text-align: center; " class="skin-invert table-no2" | No	data-sort-value="Yes" style="background: #DFD; color:black; vertical-align: middle; text-align: center; " class="table-yes2 skin-invert" | Yes	
Premier Inn	Edinburgh Park (Airport)	NFC	data-sort-value="Yes" style="background: #DFD; color:black; vertical-align: middle; text-align: center; " class="table-yes2 skin-invert" | Yes	data-sort-value="No" style="background: #FFE3E3; color:black; vertical-align: middle; text-align: center; " class="skin-invert table-no2" | No	data-sort-value="No" style="background: #FFE3E3; color:black; vertical-align: middle; text-align: center; " class="skin-invert table-no2" | No	data-sort-value="Yes" style="background: #DFD; color:black; vertical-align: middle; text-align: center; " class="table-yes2 skin-invert" | Yes	
Premier Inn	London Hammersmith	NFC	data-sort-value="Yes" style="background: #DFD; color:black; vertical-align: middle; text-align: center; " class="table-yes2 skin-invert" | Yes	data-sort-value="No" style="background: #FFE3E3; color:black; vertical-align: middle; text-align: center; " class="skin-invert table-no2" | No	data-sort-value="No" style="background: #FFE3E3; color:black; vertical-align: middle; text-align: center; " class="skin-invert table-no2" | No	data-sort-value="Yes" style="background: #DFD; color:black; vertical-align: middle; text-align: center; " class="table-yes2 skin-invert" | Yes	
Premier Inn	London Westminster	NFC	data-sort-value="Yes" style="background: #DFD; color:black; vertical-align: middle; text-align: center; " class="table-yes2 skin-invert" | Yes	data-sort-value="No" style="background: #FFE3E3; color:black; vertical-align: middle; text-align: center; " class="skin-invert table-no2" | No	data-sort-value="No" style="background: #FFE3E3; color:black; vertical-align: middle; text-align: center; " class="skin-invert table-no2" | No	data-sort-value="Yes" style="background: #DFD; color:black; vertical-align: middle; text-align: center; " class="table-yes2 skin-invert" | Yes	
Premier Inn	London Kings Cross	NFC	data-sort-value="Yes" style="background: #DFD; color:black; vertical-align: middle; text-align: center; " class="table-yes2 skin-invert" | Yes	data-sort-value="No" style="background: #FFE3E3; color:black; vertical-align: middle; text-align: center; " class="skin-invert table-no2" | No	data-sort-value="No" style="background: #FFE3E3; color:black; vertical-align: middle; text-align: center; " class="skin-invert table-no2" | No	data-sort-value="Yes" style="background: #DFD; color:black; vertical-align: middle; text-align: center; " class="table-yes2 skin-invert" | Yes	
Premier Inn	Manchester Old Trafford	NFC	data-sort-value="Yes" style="background: #DFD; color:black; vertical-align: middle; text-align: center; " class="table-yes2 skin-invert" | Yes	data-sort-value="No" style="background: #FFE3E3; color:black; vertical-align: middle; text-align: center; " class="skin-invert table-no2" | No	data-sort-value="No" style="background: #FFE3E3; color:black; vertical-align: middle; text-align: center; " class="skin-invert table-no2" | No	data-sort-value="Yes" style="background: #DFD; color:black; vertical-align: middle; text-align: center; " class="table-yes2 skin-invert" | Yes	
Proper Hotels	The Shelborne	NFC	Yes	No	No	Yes	
Red Roof Inn	Spot X Hotel Orlando	NFC	No	No	No	Yes	
Resorts World Las Vegas		NFC	Yes	No	No	Yes	
Roe & Co	Park Terrace Hotel	NFC	Yes	No	No	Yes	
Strawberry	Clarion Hotel Post	NFC	Yes	No	No	Yes	
Strawberry	Clarion Hotel Karlatornet	NFC	Yes	No	No	Yes	
The Kenrick Hotel		NFC	Yes	No	No	Yes	
The Sendal Botique Hotel		NFC	Yes	No	No	Yes	
YHA Australia	All Properties	NFC	Yes	No	No	Yes	

* = Not available for Wear OS

== Other ==
Brand	Model	NFC/UWB	Google Wallet	Samsung Wallet	Huawei Wallet	Apple Wallet
Samsonite	Smart Business Suitcase	NFC	No	No	Yes	No
