= Breeze Card =

Public transit smart card used in Atlanta, Georgia

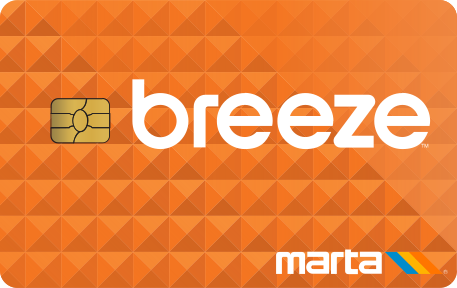
- A third-generation orange Breeze card
- Location: Metro Atlanta
- Launched: October 2006
- Technology: Contactless smart card
- Operator: Cubic Corporation (2006-2026), INIT (2026-)
- Manager: MARTA
- Currency: USD
- Validity: MARTA; CobbLinc; Ride Gwinnett; Connect Douglas; GRTA Xpress
- Retailed: Breeze Ticket Vending Machines (TVM); Online; Mobile app
- Variants: Extended-use card; Limited-use ticket; UPASS Student card; Reduced fare card; Mobility card
- Website: www.breezecard.com

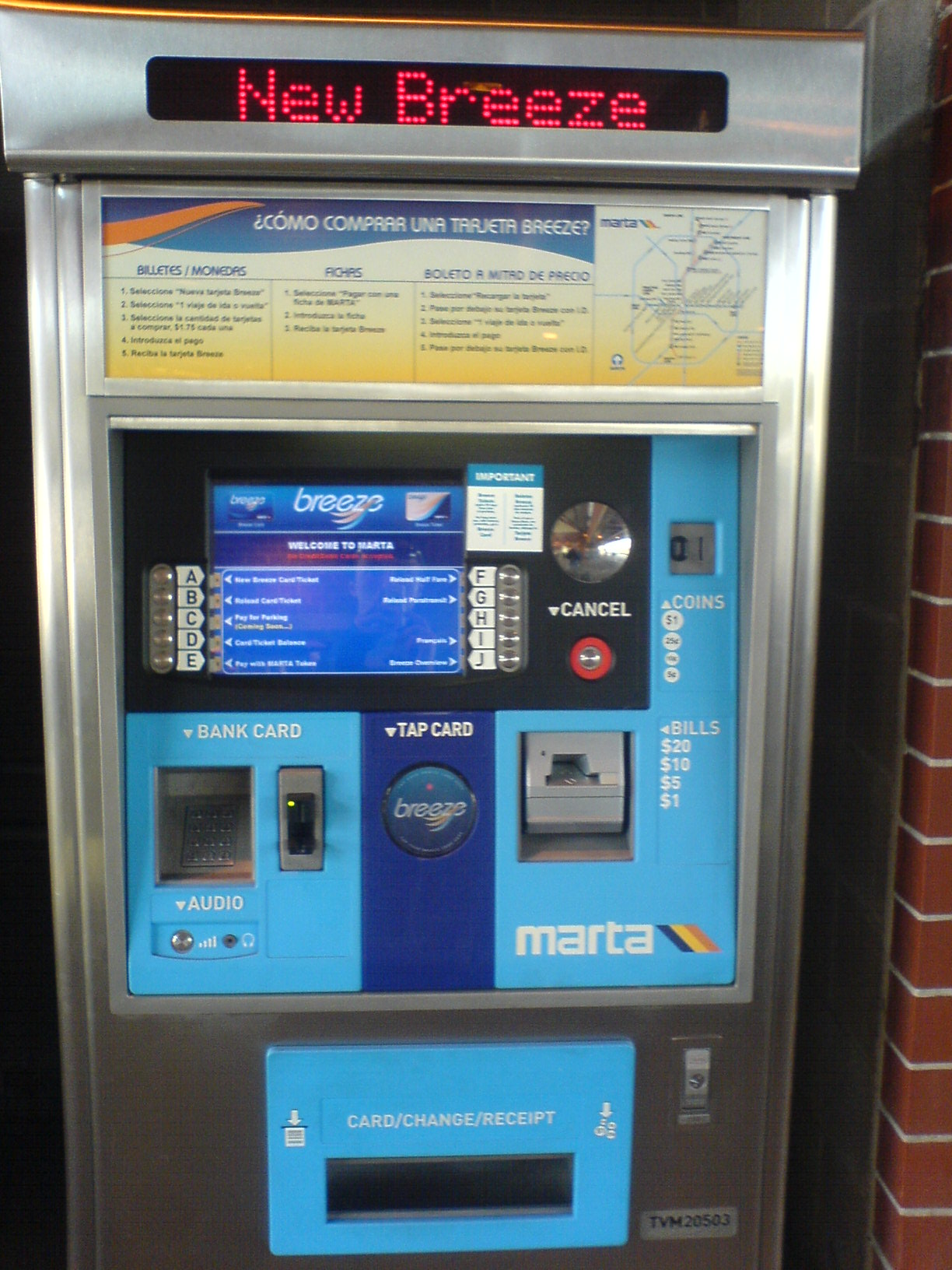
Former Breeze vending machine, used prior to the installation of the current system

The Breeze Card is a contactless smart card used on bus and rapid transit routes in Metro Atlanta. It is part of an automated fare collection system which Metropolitan Atlanta Rapid Transit Authority (MARTA) introduced to the general public in early October 2006. The card can also be used on CobbLinc, Ride Gwinnett, Connect Douglas, and Xpress buses.

Transit riders are able to add value or time-based passes to the card at Breeze ticket machines located at all MARTA stations and select retail locations. Passes and fares can be purchased from the Breeze Mobile app, Apple Wallet, Google Wallet or Samsung Wallet.

On July 1, 2007, the TransCard and the paper bus transfers were discontinued and patrons now use a Breeze Card or Ticket to access the system (except for single bus rides, which can still be paid for in exact change), and all transfers are loaded on the card.

MARTA's Breeze allows riders to load money on the card for use over time, and to add 7- and 30-day passes that are not fixed to a calendar period. The system provides a better way for MARTA to analyze transit patterns, allowing for schedule changes to suit demand, and free up more staff to work directly with customers in stations. Breeze also helps prevent fare evasion, which in previous years cost an estimated US$10 million annually.

== Prior to Breeze ==
MARTA used plastic fare tokens since its rail system began operating in 1979.

In 1995, MARTA opted in a plastic stored-value card pilot run by Visa during the 1996 Summer Olympics. MARTA ended the program in 1998 but expressed interest in using smart cards in the future. In 2003, MARTA entered negotiations with Cubic Transportation Systems to replace the existing fare system with one using smart cards.

== Rollout ==
In preparation for the Breeze Card, MARTA initially deployed the Breeze Ticket, a limited-use paper stored value card. During the installation phase (December 2005 to September 2006) Breeze gates were installed in all stations, there were new bus fare boxes and Breeze vending machines, in which individuals can buy tickets encoded with one ride. MARTA first implemented Breeze at the Bankhead station in December 2005. The fare gates were criticized by the MARTA Board of Directors due to the bottom of the gates being 15 inches (380 mm) above the ground, allowing fare evaders to crawl underneath the gates. MARTA corrected the issue by attaching plastic bars to the bottom of the gates, reducing the gap to 6 inches (150 mm). System wide installation (both train stations and buses) was completed in early September, making MARTA the first system in the United States to move towards only smart cards for fare (excepting cash).

Between October 2006 and July 2007, patrons were allowed to purchase Breeze Cards (which initially expired three years after first use) for free. Also, starting October 2006, patrons were allowed to reload Breeze Tickets (which expire 90 days after purchase). After July 2007, the price to purchase a Breeze Card and a Breeze Ticket were set to $5 and $0.50 respectively. The ticket vending machines also allowed patrons to pay for parking at certain stations.

The system stopped selling tokens in the late fall, and magnetic weekly and monthly MARTA cards were still sold until July 2007 when magnetic cards were invalidated permanently, signaling completion of the Breeze system conversion. Breeze Cards became available by mail to customers that pre-ordered starting September 30, 2007. As the conversion reached its final phase, MARTA hosted "token exchanges" from October to December, allowing for people with rolls of tokens to have the number of tokens encoded on an extended-use card.

In May 2007, MARTA began to charge a 50-cent surcharge on all Breeze Tickets. In July 2007, MARTA also stopped offering free Breeze Cards online and order forms from MARTA Ride Stores. Magnetic cards were invalidated permanently and MARTA stopped accepting paper transfers.

In July 2017, the original blue Breeze Cards were discontinued and replaced with new silver cards that offer, "added security to combat fraud and abuse."

== Better Breeze ==
In October 2025, MARTA announced a "Better Breeze" system with a new chipped orange card and updated faregates. The faregates were designed to support more contactless payment methods, like mobile wallet and debit/credit cards equipped with near-field communication. A new app was made with support for digital cards. New touchscreen ticket vending machines were also added and are available at various retail locations. MARTA set up an aggressive installation schedule intended to be complete prior to the 2026 FIFA Men's World Cup. The new system launched to limited public use on March 28, 2026, with complete availability scheduled for May 2026. On May 1, 2026, Breeze became available for Google Wallet and Samsung Wallet. On May 27, 2026, Breeze became available for Apple Wallet.

== Technology ==
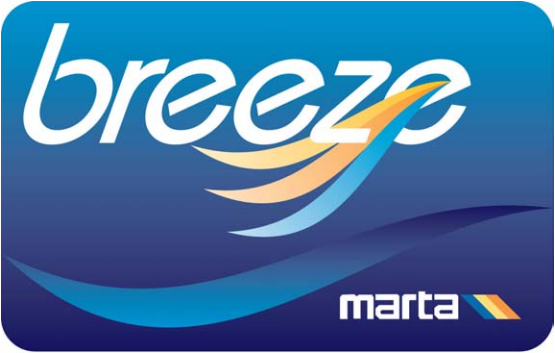
First-generation Breeze Card (blue card) used from September 2006 to July 2017

The Breeze Card uses the MIFARE smart-card system from Dutch company NXP Semiconductors, a spin-off from Philips. System supports single-use as well as multi-use cards. The disposable, single-use tickets contain MIFARE Ultralight technology.

Second-generation Breeze Card (grey card) used from July 2017 to May 2026

The first-generation of Breeze Cards (blue cards) were MIFARE Classic cards. These cards have been phased out due to known security weaknesses and are no longer valid for transportation.

The second-generation Breeze Cards (grey cards) are based on MIFARE DESFire EV1 technology.

The third and current generation Breeze Cards (orange cards) use near-field communication (NFC) technology.

== See also ==
- List of public transport smart cards
