= Yang Cheng Tong =

Smart card for public transport in Guangzhou

- Standard Card
- Location: Guangzhou, Guangdong, China
- Launched: 2001
- Manager: Guangzhou Yang Cheng Tong Limited
- Currency: CNY
- Credit expiry: None
- Auto recharge: Automatic Add Value Service
- Website: igzyct.com (Archived)

Yang Cheng Tong (Chinese: 羊城通; Jyutping: joeng4 sing4 tung1; pinyin: Yáng chéng tōng; lit. 'Ram City Pass') is a contactless rechargeable stored value smartcard designed for paying the travel fares in the metro, buses, taxis and ferries in Guangzhou, China, along with most other cities in Guangdong, with the exception of Shenzhen. It was developed and managed by Guangzhou Yang Cheng Tong Limited, bus companies in Guangzhou, and the Guangzhou Metro.

The card is accepted by selected stores, parks, restaurants, parking meters, and in other establishments as payment. With the card holder's personal information stored in the Yang Cheng Tong, further functions can be applied, such as access control of buildings and roll call in school. The system was successfully launched on 30 December 2001. According to official statistics from its operator, there are over 5 million cards in circulation and 2.2 million transactions per day.

Yang Cheng Tong literally means Ram City Pass, since the Five Rams (Chinese: 五羊; Jyutping: ng5 joeng4; pinyin: wǔ yáng) statue is one of the important landmarks in Guangzhou. It is based on the Legend of Five Goats.

== Type of cards ==
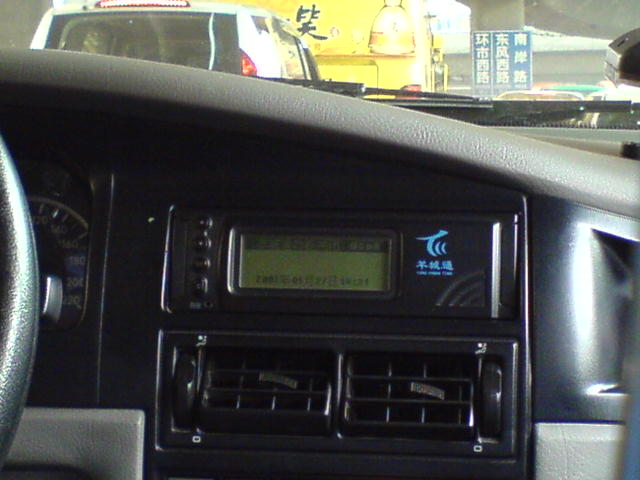
Yang Cheng Tong reader in taxi

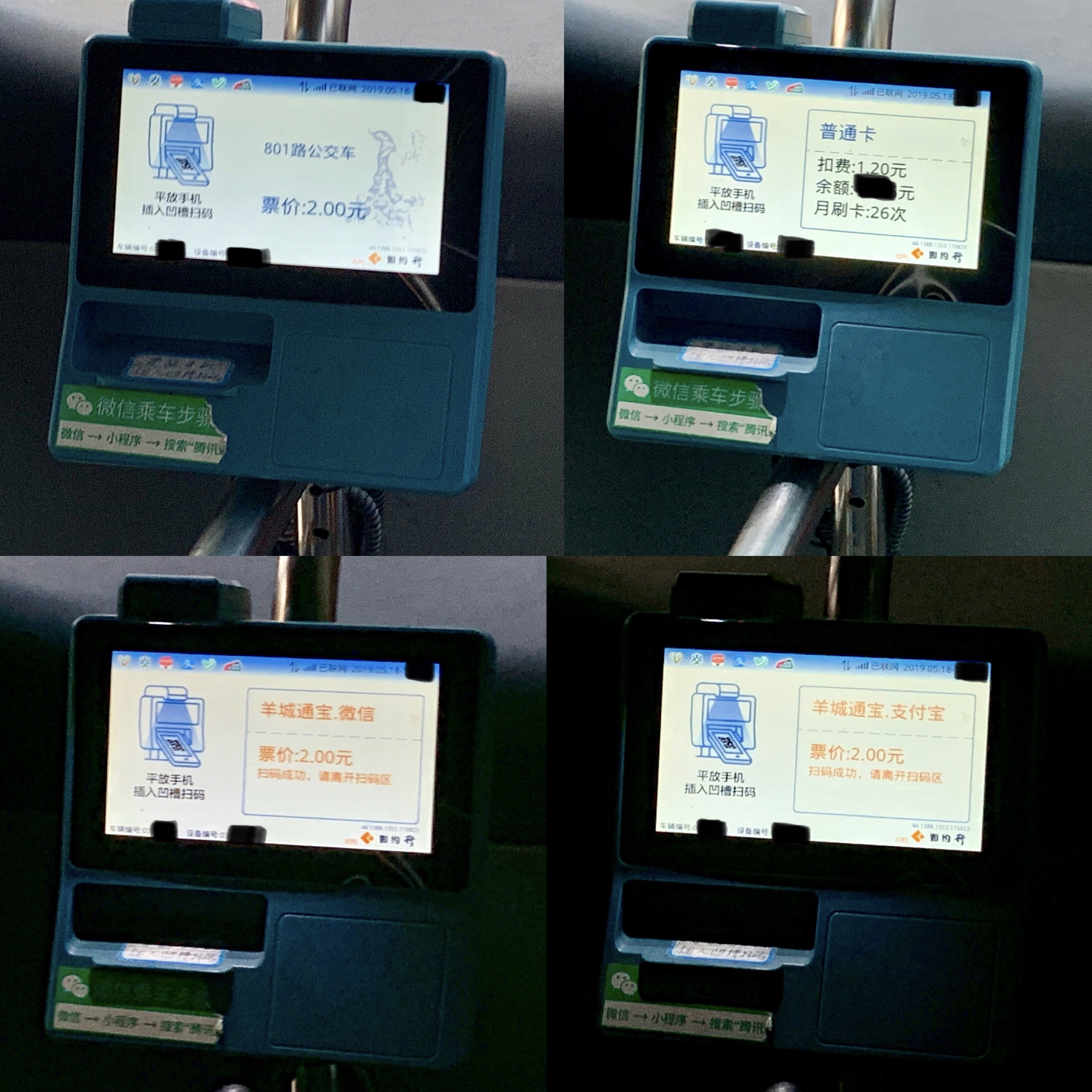
Yang Cheng Tong reader in buses, which also support payments through QR Code

There are different types of the Yang Cheng Tong card:

- Standard: Requires a deposit value of CN¥20, which is refundable upon return. Also available with China T-union standard, which can be use nationwide.
- Commemorative: Available in different sizes. Deposit not included and no refund allowed.
- Xeno-card: For wearable devices through NFC or SIM cards.
- Enterprise
- Joint card: co-iusses with local banks.
- Tour Pass
- QR Code: payments through QR Codes by multiple parties.

== See also ==
- Lingnan Pass
