= BYD e2 =

Battery electric compact hatchback

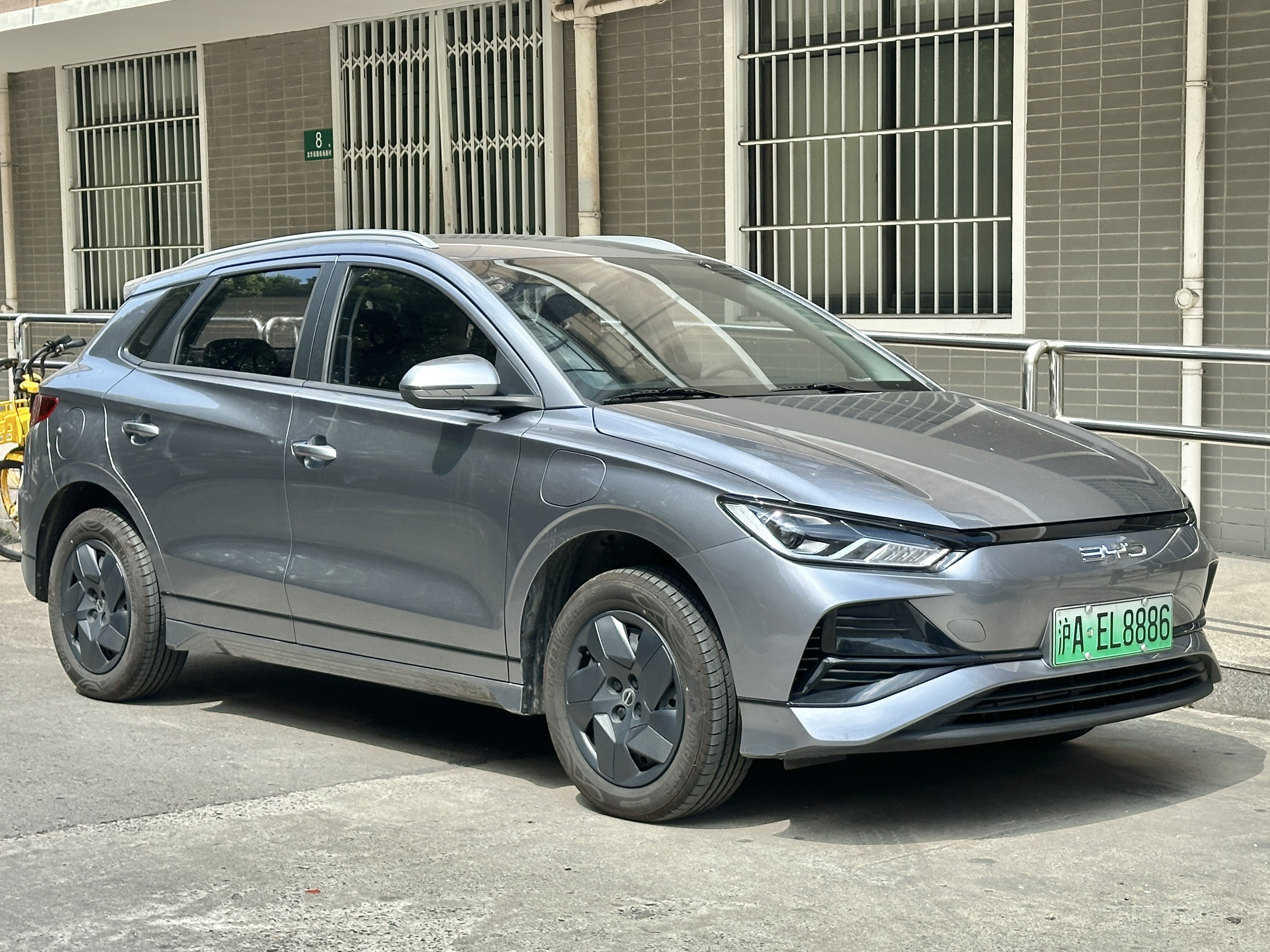
- BYD e2 2023 (facelift)

Overview
- Manufacturer: BYD
- Also called: BYD e3 (sedan)
- Production: 2019–present (e2); 2019–2022 (e3)
- Model years: 2019–present
- Designer: León Lee under Wolfgang Egger

Body and chassis
- Class: Compact car (C-segment)
- Body style: 5-door hatchback (e2); 4-door sedan (e3)
- Layout: Front-engine, front-wheel-drive

Powertrain
- Electric motor: one 70-100 kW permanent magnet motor/generators
- Transmission: 5-speed manual (e3); Single-speed automatic (EV)
- Battery: 35.2 kWh (standard); 47.3 kWh (long range) LiFePO_{4} battery pack
- Electric range: 305–405 km (190–252 mi)

Dimensions
- Wheelbase: 2,610 mm (102.8 in)
- Length: 4,240 mm (166.9 in) (e2); 4,450 mm (175.2 in) (e3)
- Width: 1,760 mm (69.3 in)
- Height: 1,530 mm (60.2 in) (e2); 1,520 mm (59.8 in) (e3)
- Curb weight: 1,330 kg (2,932 lb) (e3)

The BYD e2 is a battery electric compact hatchback developed by the Chinese manufacturer BYD Auto. Its sedan variant is sold as the BYD e3.

== Overview ==
The e2 was unveiled during the 2019 Shanghai Auto Show in April 2019. The standard e2 is equipped with a BYD-1814-TZ-XS-A permanent magnet motor with the maximum output of 94 hp (70 kW) while the e2 400 is equipped with a permanent magnet motor with the maximum output of 134 hp (100 kW), with the maximum torque of both motors being 180 N-m.

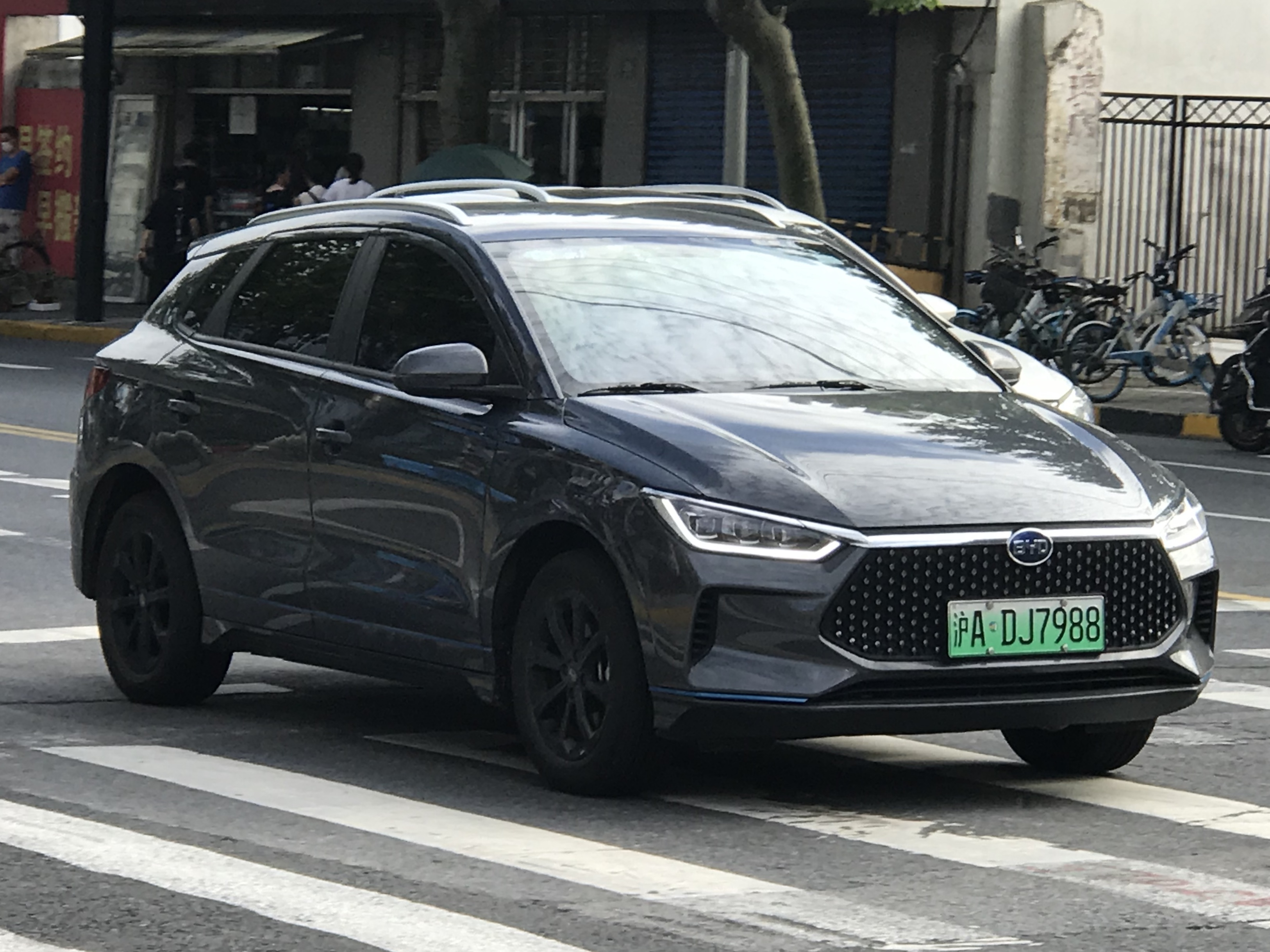
BYD e2 (pre-facelift)

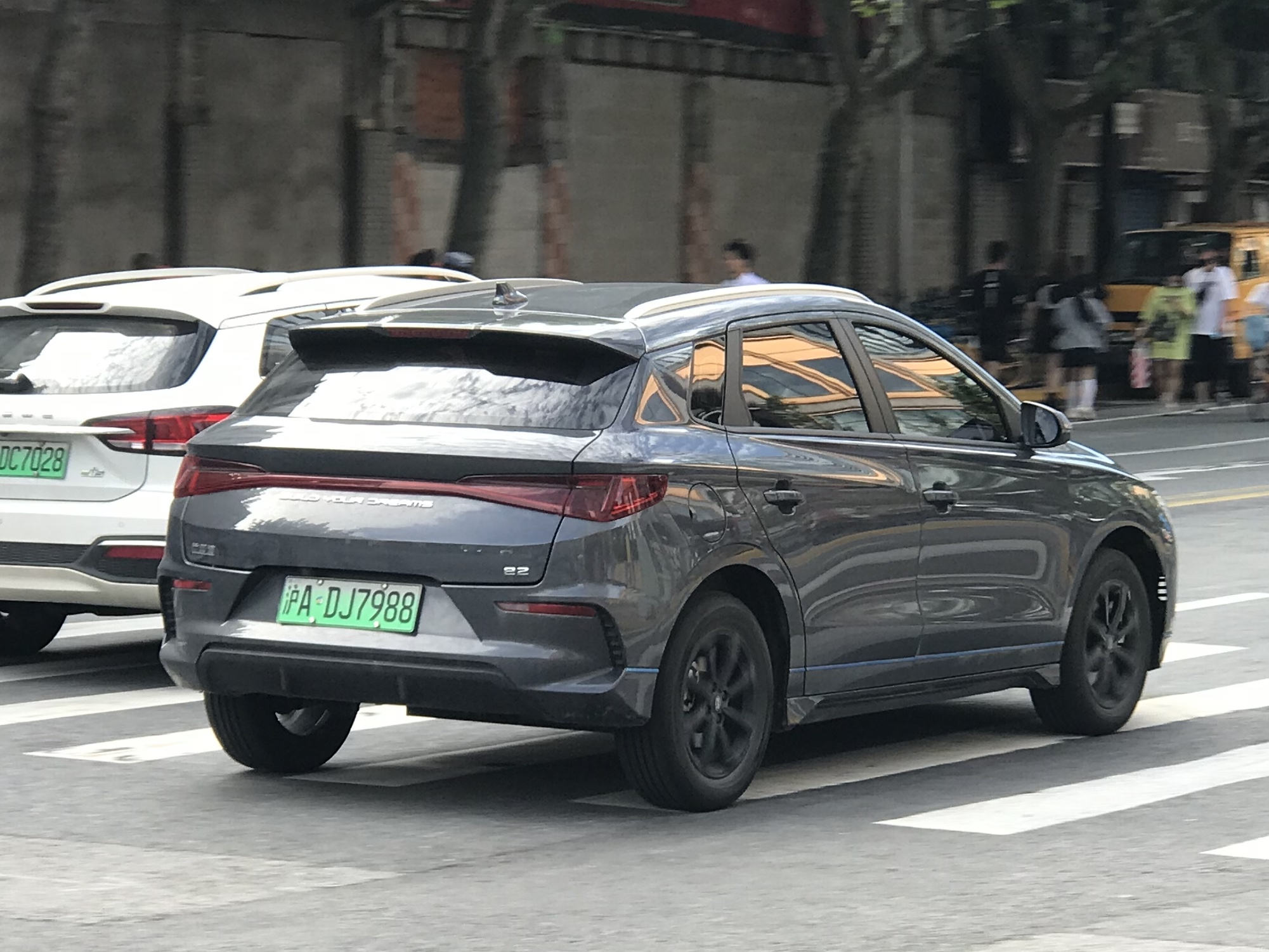
Rear view

Being the sedan version of the e2, the e3 has the same performance numbers. The e2 and e3 both come with two battery options: a 35.2 kWh model with a range of up to 305 km (190 miles) NEDC, and a 47.3 kWh model with a range of up to 405 km (252 miles) NEDC. AC normal charging takes 1.5 hours with the 35.2 kWh battery pack and 1.6 hours with the 47.3 kWh battery pack, while DC fast charging from 30 to 80% can be done in 30 minutes. Acceleration from 0 to 50 km/h (31 mph) takes 3.9 seconds.

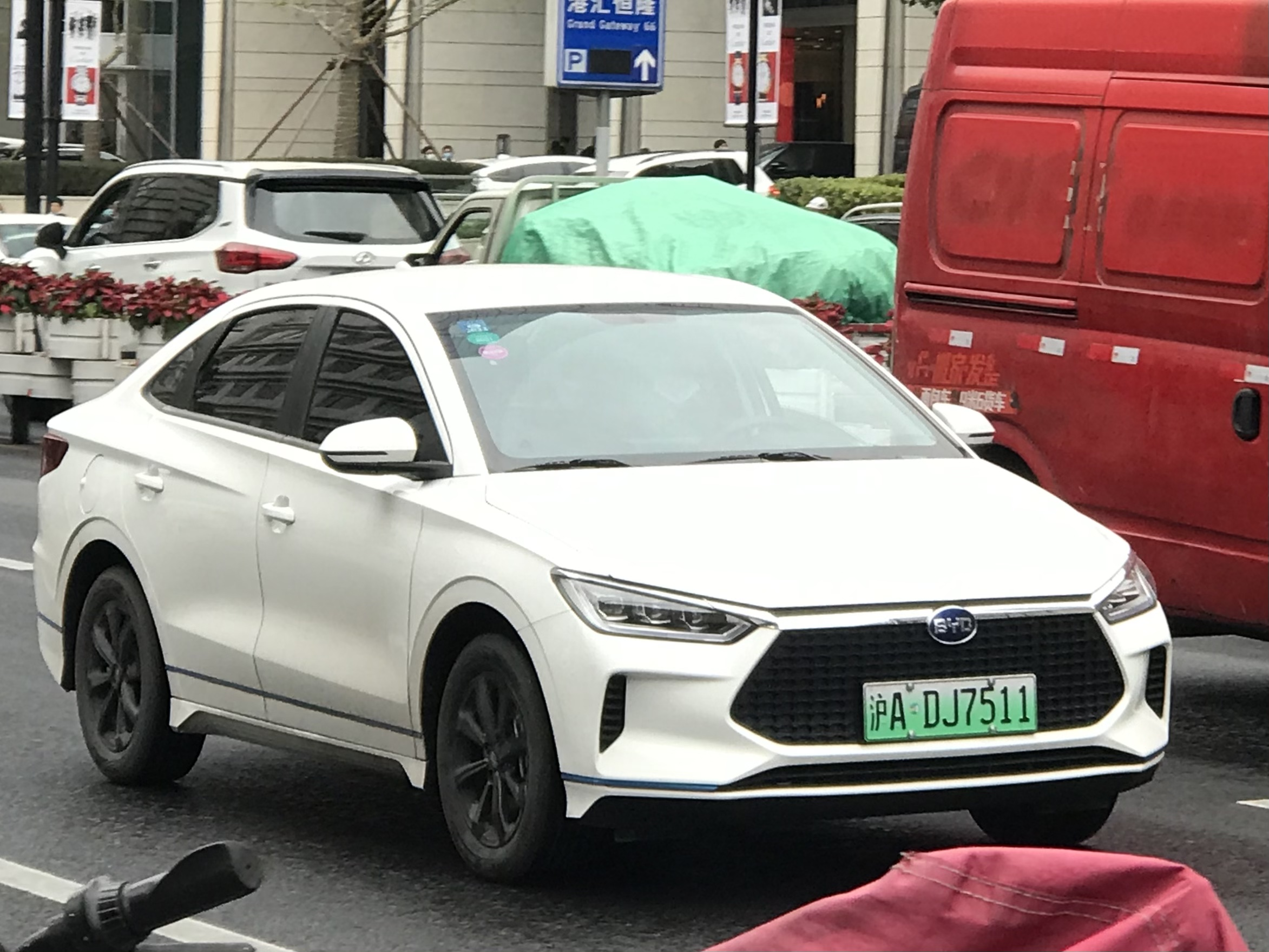
BYD e3

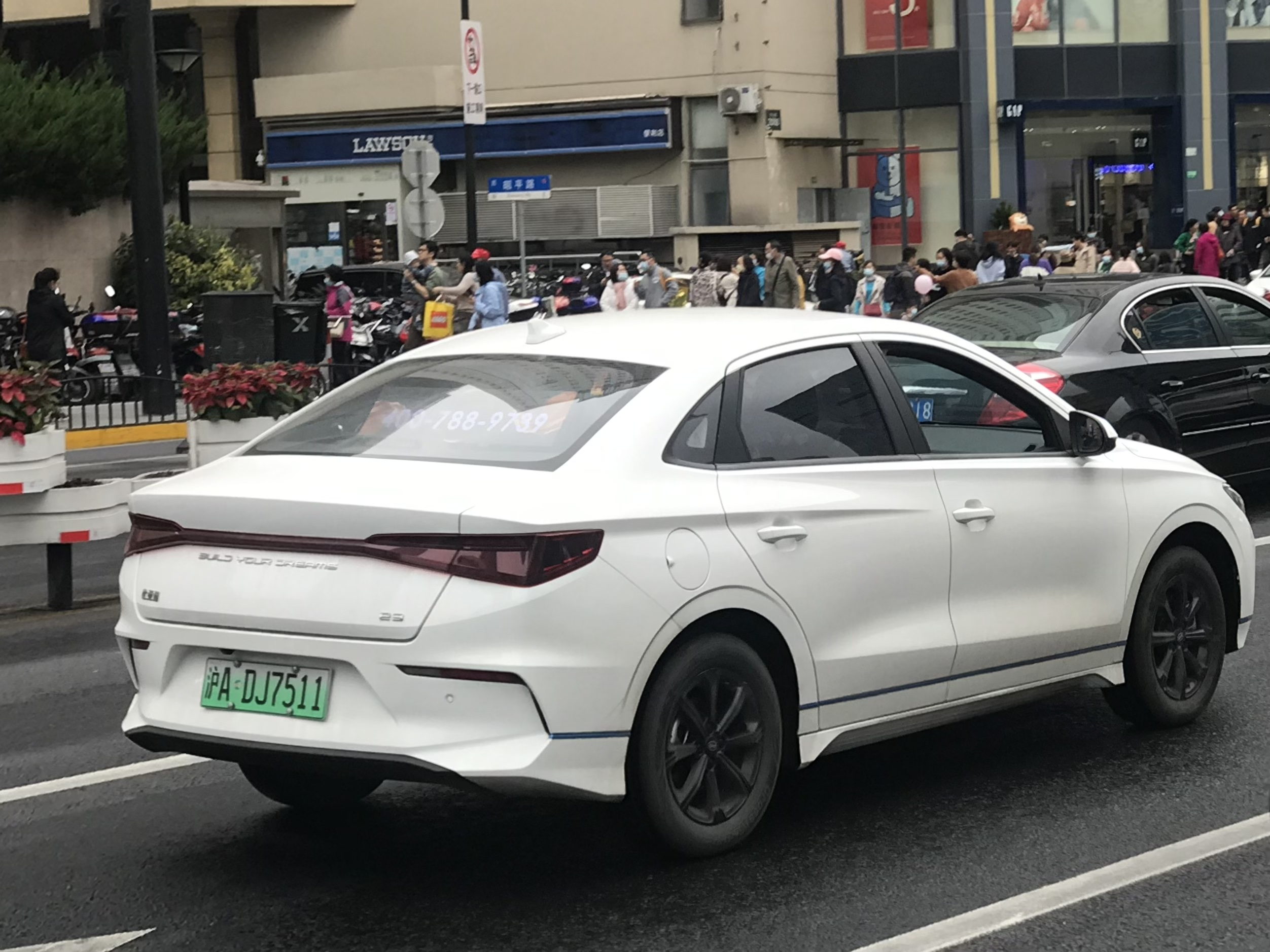
Rear view

Prices of the e2 at launch range from 89,800 yuan to 144,800 yuan. Prices of the e3 at launch range from 103,800 yuan to 164,800 yuan.

=== 2023 (facelift) ===
The e2 received a facelift updating the front fascia styling and interior in 2023. The updated model packs a 43.2 kWh LFP battery and a 95 hp electric motor, claiming a CLTC range of 405 km. The updated interior features a 8.8-inch digital display, and the NFC card is also available for the update, as well as a Bluetooth key and heat pump.

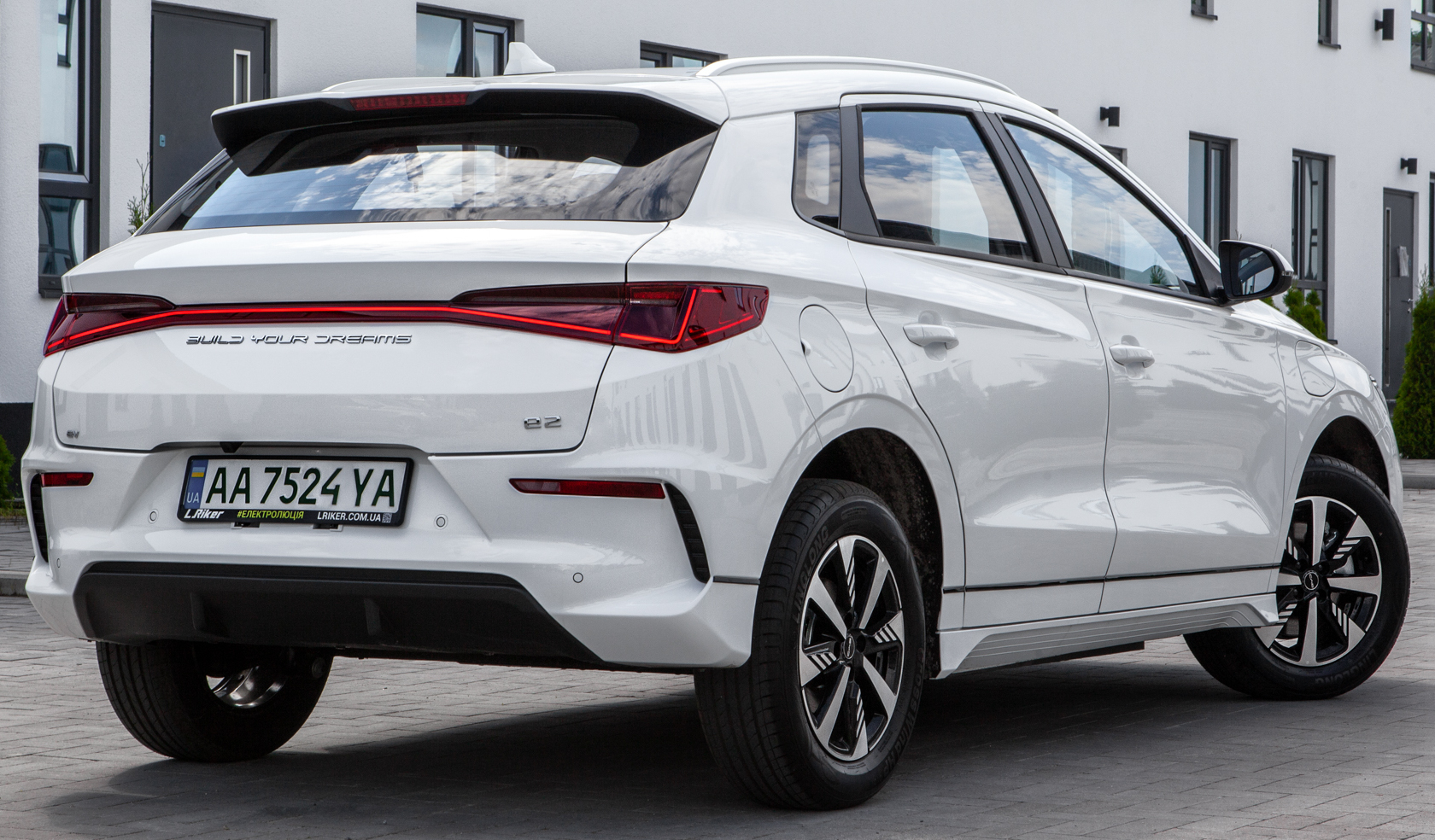
Rear view

== See also ==
- List of BYD Auto vehicles
