= Salsarita's Fresh Mexican Grill =

Fast casual Tex Mex restaurants

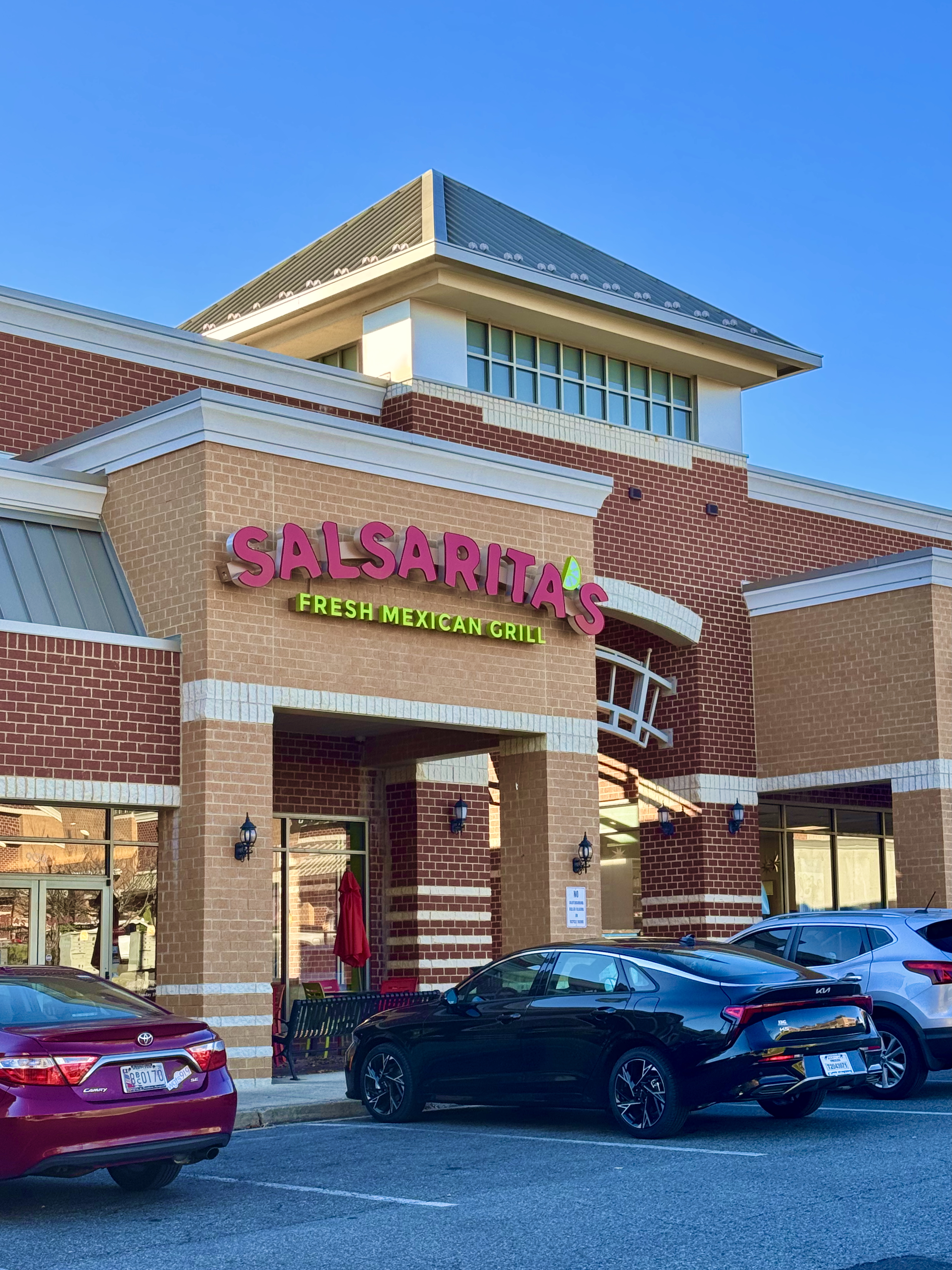
- An outlet in Prince Frederick, Maryland
- Company type: Private
- Industry: Restaurants
- Founded: 2000; 26 years ago
- Headquarters: Charlotte, North Carolina, U.S.
- Number of locations: 6 (2026)
- Area served: United States
- Website: salsaritas.com

Salsarita's Fresh Mexican Grill is a chain of fast casual Tex Mex restaurants in the United States serving Mexican-style cuisine. The company is headquartered in Charlotte, North Carolina, and operates 6 restaurants throughout North Carolina.

== History ==
The chain was founded in 2000 by Bruce Willette. It was purchased by Phil Friedman in 2011. Friedman expanded the number of Salsarita's.

== Menu ==
Salsarita's menu consists of six core items: burritos, bowls, quesaritos, tacos, quesadillas, and salads.

Most Salsarita's locations offer a variety of beer and wine, with a few having full-sized bars.

In 2014, the chain worked with PuckerButt Pepper of South Carolina to create the "World's Hottest Burrito" using Carolina Reaper peppers.

== Catering ==
Most Salsarita's locations offer Catering that can either be delivered or picked up. Catering options include Taco Bars, Fajita Bars, Taco Salad Bars, Nacho Bars, Burrito Boxed Lunches, Taco Salad Boxed Lunches and Salsarita's signature Fiesta Packs.
