= China T-Union =

Contactless transport card used in China

China T-union
- Location: Inland China Hong Kong Macao
- Launched: 29 June 2015
- Operator: China Transport Telecommunication & Information Center (CTTIC)
- Manager: Ministry of Transport, China Transport Telecommunication & Information Center
- Currency: Renminbi
- Validity: Bus, metro, ferries in 336 Chinese cities
- Retailed: Railway and metro stations

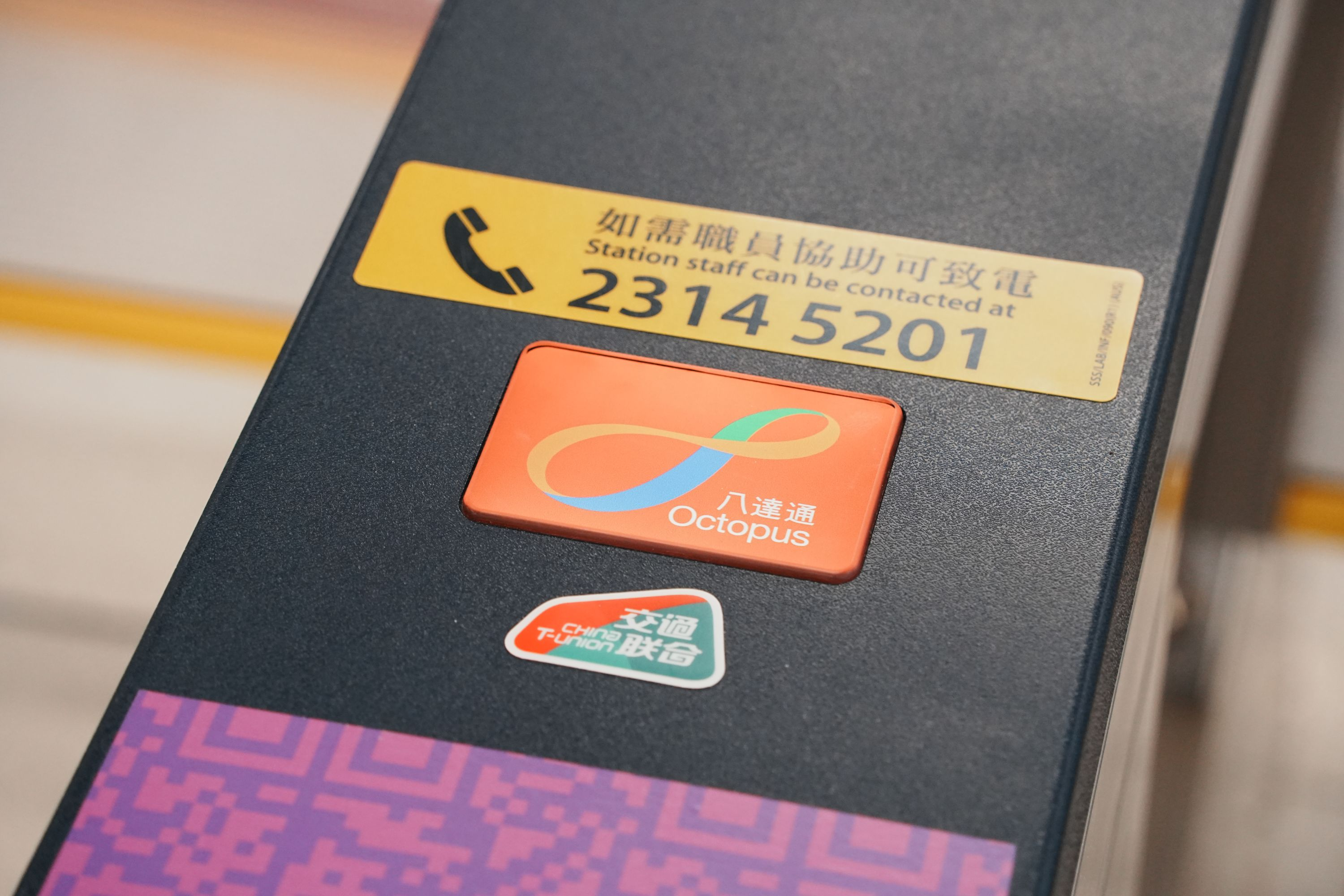
Subway gate that supports T-union card in a MTR Station.

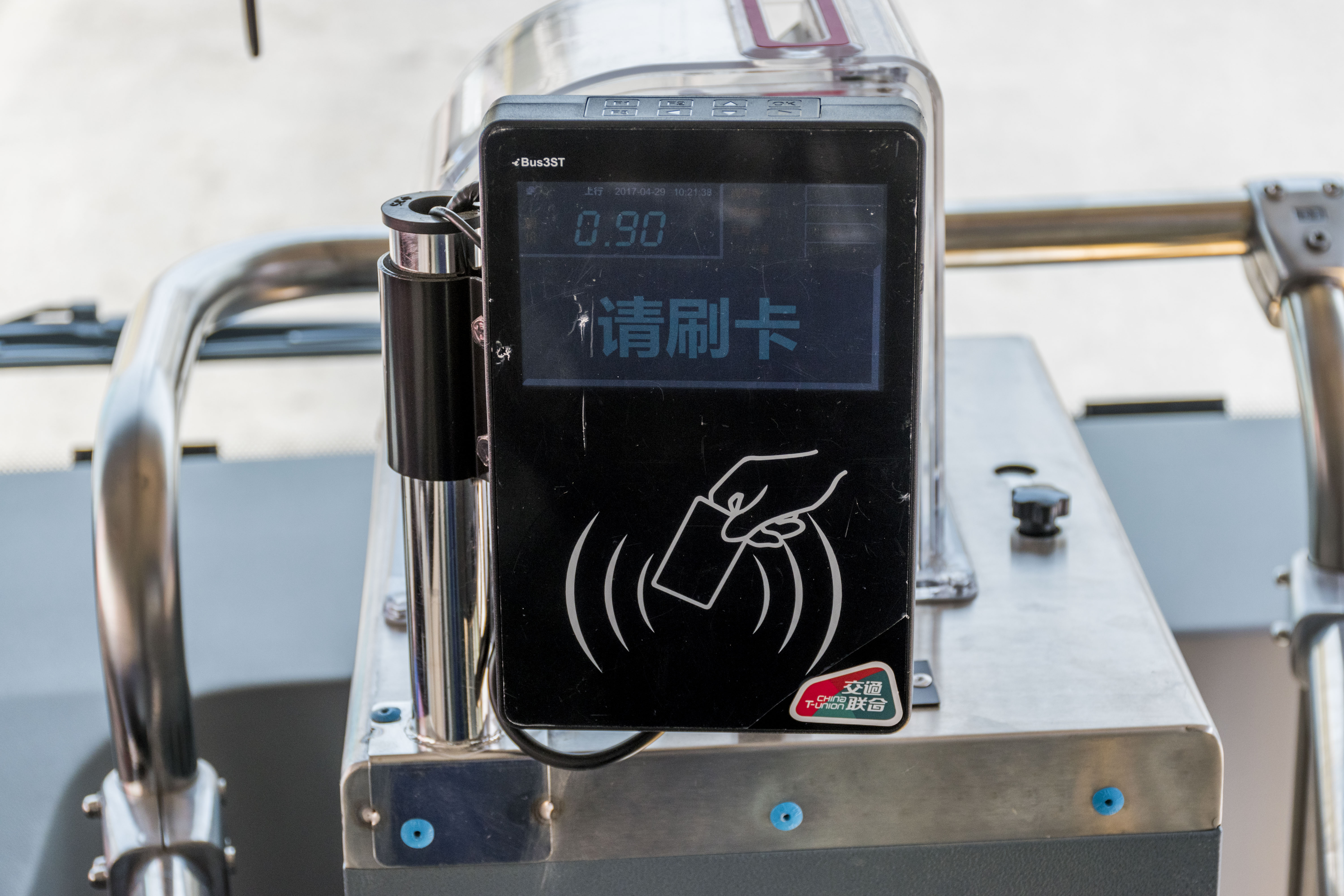
T-union card reader on a Dalian bus.

China T-Union (Chinese: 交通联合), also known as TU (Chinese: 交联), is a contactless transport card widely used in China. Cardholders can pay for public transport fares in any covered service in China, but card reloading is limited to the locale of initial issuance or through the card issuer's mobile application, where available.

The Ministry of Transport approved the development of the card and pilot projects in 2012. In 2015 the card was launched in Zhenjiang. In 2016, 110 cities supported the card and the following year this number was raised to 165.

By December 2023, 336 cities in China supported the card, and all urban rail transport systems in mainland China support T-Union cards except in Hohhot.

On 26 March 2024, the China T-Union system marked its first expansion beyond mainland China in Hong Kong, with the Hong Kong-Zhuhai-Macao Bridge Shuttle Bus service beginning to accept China T-Union cards at select ticket vending machines in its Hong Kong Port.

The China T-Union organization itself does not directly issue cards; instead, local authorities handle card issuance. Hence, the design of the card varies by issuing region.

In 2018, the Hungarian government invited CTTIC to discuss potential implementation of the system in Hungarian public transport.

== Transport services covered ==
As of December 2023, the card can be used in 336 cities in China as following:

Beijing	All buses (Excluding customized buses), subway and Line S2 Other suburban railways than S2 line (Huaimi, Sub-Central, and Tongmi lines) only support Beijing Yikatong, as real-name register are required. Not all T-union cards of other cities are supported, because Beijing Municipality government controls their own whitelist system for opt-in.
Tianjin	All buses of Tianjin Bus, Tianjin Binhai Public Transport, Tianjin Transportation Group, Eco-city Bus and Jizhou Transport (except long-instance customize services) and metro lines
Hebei	All bus and metro lines in Shijiazhuang All bus routes in Baoding, Cangzhou, Chengde, Handan, Hengshui, Langfang, Qinhuangdao, Tangshan, Xingtai and Zhangjiakou, as well as in Xiong'an
Shanxi	All bus and metro lines in Taiyuan All bus routes in Changzhi, Datong, Jincheng, Jinzhong, Linfen, Lüliang, Shuozhou, Xinzhou, Yangquan and Yuncheng
Inner Mongolia	All bus routes in Baotou, Bayannur, Chifeng, Hohhot, Hulunbuir, Ordos, and Alxa League Buses in Kailu and Jarud Banner of Tongliao, Tuquan and Horqin Right Front Banner of Hinggan League, Liangcheng County of Ulanqab, Xilinhot and Erenhot Hohhot Metro only supports single/stored tickets, or mobile Apps, they have negative interests in supporting IC cards. Wuhai buses no longer support T-union since 20 September 2024.
Liaoning	All bus and metro lines in Shenyang and Dalian All bus routes in Anshan, Benxi, Chaoyang, Dandong, Fushun, Fuxin, Huludao, Jinzhou, Liaoyang, Panjin, Tieling and Yingkou
Jilin	All bus and metro lines in Changchun All bus routes in Baicheng, Baishan, Jilin, Liaoyuan (except Weijin bus), Siping, Songyuan, Tonghua and Yanbian Prefecture, as well as in Changbaishan area
Heilongjiang	All bus, metro and ferry lines in Harbin All bus routes in Daqing, Hegang, Heihe, Jiamusi, Jixi, Mudanjiang, Qiqihar, Qitaihe, Suihua, Yichun and Daxing'anling region Some bus routes in Shuangyashan
Shanghai	All bus, metro, commuter, ferry and tram lines in Shanghai
Jiangsu	All bus, metro, taxi and ferry lines, as well as shared bicycles in Nanjing (cards must have no secret keys of MOHURD City Union) All bus, metro and taxi lines in Suzhou, Wuxi, Changzhou and Xuzhou All bus, tram and taxi lines in Huai'an All bus and metro lines in Nantong All bus and taxi lines in Lianyungang, Suqian, Taizhou, Yancheng, Yangzhou, Zhenjiang
Zhejiang	All bus and metro lines in Hangzhou, Jinhua, Taizhou, Wenzhou All bus, metro and commuter lines in Ningbo and Shaoxing All bus, metro and tram lines in Jiaxing All bus routes in Huzhou, Lishui, Quzhou and Zhoushan
Anhui	All bus and metro lines in Hefei, Wuhu and Chuzhou All bus routes in Anqing, Bengbu, Bozhou, Chizhou, Fuyang, Huaibei, Huainan, Huangshan, Lu'an, Ma'anshan, Suzhou, Tongling and Xuancheng
Fujian	All bus and metro lines in Fuzhou All bus, metro and ferry lines in Xiamen All bus and ferry lines in Putian All bus lines in Zhangzhou, Quanzhou, Sanming, Nanping and Ningde, as well as in Pingtan area Rural buses in Longyan (Longyan urban area no longer supports T-union since 2021)
Jiangxi	All bus and metro lines in Nanchang All bus lines in Ganzhou, Ji'an, Jiujiang, Jingdezhen, Pingxiang, Xinyu, Yingtan, Yichun, Shangrao and Fuzhou
Shandong	All bus and subway lines in Ji'nan All bus, metro and ferry lines in Qingdao (however, fabricate cards of Apple Pay don't support Qingdao Metro) All bus lines in Yantai, Ji'ning, Weihai, Linyi, Dezhou, Binzhou, Heze, Zaozhuang, Zibo, Tai'an, Rizhao, Liaocheng, Weifang and Dongying
Henan	All bus and metro lines in Zhengzhou and Luoyang All bus and Water Bus lines in Xuchang All bus routes in Pingdingshan, Anyang, Xinxiang, Jiaozuo, Shangqiu, Xinyang, Zhumadian, Puyang, Kaifeng, Nanyang, Luohe, Sanmenxia, Hebi, Zhoukou and Jiyuan
Hubei	All bus, metro and ferry lines in Wuhan All bus and tram lines in Huangshi All bus routes in Xianning, Qianjiang, Jingmen, Suizhou, Ezhou, Yichang, Xiangyang, Xiantao, Tianmen, Xiaogan, Huanggang and Shiyan Some bus routes in Shennongjia
Hunan	All bus and metro lines in Changsha and Xiangtan All bus routes in Zhuzhou, Hengyang, Shaoyang, Yueyang, Changde, Zhangjiajie, Yiyang, Chenzhou, Yongzhou, Huaihua, Loudi and Xiangxi Prefecture
Guangdong	All bus, tram, water buses and metro lines in Guangzhou; All bus, tram and metro lines in Shenzhen and Foshan; All bus and metro lines in Dongguan; All bus routes in Zhaoqing, Qingyuan, Huizhou, Shaoguan, Zhuhai, Shantou, Jiangmen, Zhanjiang, Maoming, Meizhou, Shanwei, Heyuan, Yangjiang, Zhongshan, Chaozhou, Jieyang and Yunfu Guangdong Intercity commuter lines (Guanghui, Guangzhao, Guangfo Ring and Guangqing) require real-name register, but support all type of T-union cards. Business Class of Shenzhen Metro Line 11 only supports local cards of Shenzhen.
Guangxi	All bus and metro lines in Nanning All bus routes in Liuzhou, Qinzhou, Baise, Hezhou, Laibin, Guilin, Beihai, Fangchenggang, Guigang, Yulin, Congzuo, Wuzhou and Hechi
Hainan	All bus and tram lines in Sanya All bus routes in Haikou and Danzhou Bus routes in Wenchang no longer support T-union since 2023.
Chongqing	All metro lines, all bus routes except in Changshou District, Yangtze River Cableway and two escalators Only buses in urban area, Jiangjin, Dianjiang County and Wansheng development zone, or buses with single fare regime support T-union cards of other cities
Sichuan	All bus and metro lines in Chengdu All bus lines in Bazhong, Dazhou, Deyang, Guang'an, Guangyuan, Leshan, Luzhou, Meishan, Mianyang, Nanchong, Neijiang, Panzhihua, Suining, Ya'an, Yibin, Zigong, Ziyang, and Ngawa, Ganzi, Liangshan Prefectures
Guizhou	All bus and metro lines in Guiyang All bus lines in Bijie, Liupanshui, Tongren, Zunyi, and Qiandongnan, Qiannan, Qianxinan Prefectures Some bus routes in Anshun
Yunnan	All bus and metro lines in Kunming All bus lines in Baoshan, Lijiang, Lincang, Pu'er, Qujing, Yuxi, Zhaotong, and Chuxiong, Diqing, Honghe, Nujiang, Wenshan, Xishuangbanna Prefectures Some bus routes in Dali and Dehong Prefectures
Tibet	All bus lines in Lhasa, Shigatse, Chamdo, Nyingchi, Shannan, Nagqu and Ngari Prefecture
Shaanxi	All bus and metro lines in Xi'an and Xianyang All bus routes in Baoji, Tongchuan, Weinan, Yan'an, Hanzhong, Yulin, Ankang and Shangluo, as well as in Yangling area
Gansu	All bus, metro and ferry lines in Lanzhou All bus lines in Jiayuguan, Jinchang, Wuwei, Zhangye, Pingliang, Jiuquan, Dingxi, Longnan, and Gannan and Linxia Prefectures Some bus routes in Baiyin, Tianshui and Qingyang
Qinghai	All bus routes in Xining, Haidong, and Huangnan, Yushu, Haixi Prefectures
Ningxia	All bus routes in Yinchuan, Shizuishan, Zhongwei, Guyuan and Wuzhong
Xinjiang (include XPCC)	All bus and metro lines in Ürümqi All bus routes in Karamay, Hami, and Changji, Ili, Bortala, Bayingolin, Kizilsu, Aksu, Kashgar and Altay Prefectures Some bus routes in XPCC (Aral, Beitun, Kunyu, Shihezi, Tiemenguan, Tumxuk, Wujiaqu, Xinxing, and Western Ürümqi)
Hong Kong	HZM Shuttle bus (use TVM), MTR railways (except Airport Express, MTR Light Rail and First Class of East Rail line)
Macau	All bus routes (except HZM Shuttle bus)
