= Rivian and Volkswagen Group Technologies =

Automotive technology joint venture

Rivian and Volkswagen Group Technologies, LLC
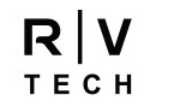
- Trade name: Rivian and Volkswagen Group Technologies
- Type: Private
- Industry: Automotive; Software development
- Founded: November 13, 2024; 21 months ago
- Headquarters: Palo Alto, California, U.S.
- Owners: Rivian (50%); Volkswagen Group (50%)
- Number of employees: 1,500 (2025)
- Website: rivianvw.tech

Rivian and Volkswagen Group Technologies, LLC (also known as RV Tech) is an automotive technology company jointly owned by Rivian and Volkswagen Group. The company was established in 2024 as a joint venture with the goal of advancing the capabilities of software-defined vehicles.

Rivian and Volkswagen Group Technologies focuses on developing scalable technology platforms that can be applied across a range of vehicle segments. Its primary areas of focus include operating systems, zonal controllers, and cloud connectivity solutions. The partnership was aimed to reduce production costs and enhance competitiveness in the EV market by combining Rivian’s software expertise with Volkswagen’s manufacturing experience.

== Operations ==
Rivian and Volkswagen Group Technologies, LLC is headquartered in Palo Alto, with additional development sites planned across North America and Europe. The joint venture is owned equally by Rivian and Volkswagen Group and is co-led by Rivian’s Chief Software Officer, Wassym Bensaid, and Volkswagen Group’s Chief Technology Officer, Carsten Helbing. Volkswagen has committed up to US$5.8 billion to the venture, including an initial US$1 billion loan, US$1.3 billion in equity investment, and up to US$3.5 billion in milestone-based funding through 2026. The venture has demonstrated its operational efficiency by integrating Rivian’s zonal hardware and software into a Volkswagen test vehicle within twelve weeks of formation.

== Technology ==
The joint venture focuses on the development of scalable software-defined vehicle (SDV) platforms. A central component of the technology is Rivian’s zonal architecture, which reduces the number of electronic control units and simplifies vehicle wiring, resulting in lower costs and improved system reliability. The SDV platform aims to support over-the-air software updates and cloud connectivity, offering a unified technology base for multiple vehicle brands and segments.

== Future products ==
Volkswagen has introduced the ID EVERY1, a compact four-door hatchback projected to enter production in 2027 with a starting price of €20,000 (approximately $21,500). This vehicle will be the first to incorporate software and architecture developed through Rivian and Volkswagen Group Technologies.

Rivian plans to begin production of its R2 vehicles in 2026, leveraging the joint venture’s technology to offer more affordable EV option.

Scout Motors upcoming EVs, including the Traveler SUV and Terra pickup, will use the Rivian-VW joint venture’s zonal software and electronics architecture starting in 2027 to simplify vehicle systems and improve efficiency.

Audi will use the joint venture's zonal architecture for an upcoming vehicle set to arrive as early as 2028, marking the first Audi built on the platform developed by RV Tech.

Rivian’s Chief Software Officer, Wassym Bensaid, noted that several other automakers have expressed interest in this technology, though specific names and details of these discussions remain undisclosed.
