= Mind Robotics =

Robotics company

- Type: Private
- Industry: Artificial intelligence, Robotics
- Founded: 2025
- Founders: RJ Scaringe
- Headquarters: Palo Alto, California, United States
- Products: AI-enabled industrial robotic systems
- Website: www.mindrobotics.com

Mind Robotics is an American robotics company that develops artificial intelligence–enabled robotic systems for industrial and manufacturing applications.

== History ==
Mind Robotics was established as a spinoff from Rivian. The company originated from internal research efforts focused on applying software and automation technologies to manufacturing.

Rivian founder RJ Scaringe is a co-founder of Mind Robotics and serves as its chairman. Rivian maintains an ownership stake and strategic relationship with the company.

== Technology and operations ==
The company develops robotic systems that integrate machine learning with industrial hardware. Its work focuses on automating tasks in manufacturing environments, including assembly and material handling.

Mind Robotics uses data from industrial processes to train and improve its systems. Its approach is often described as “physical AI,” referring to the application of artificial intelligence to real-world robotic tasks.

== Deployment ==
Mind Robotics’ systems are being developed and deployed within manufacturing facilities operated by Rivian, which serve as the company’s primary testing and initial deployment environment.

Rivian’s factories also provide operational data, including inputs from production systems and factory sensors, which are used to train and refine the company’s machine learning models during deployment.

== Funding ==
Mind Robotics raised approximately $115 million in seed funding in 2025.

In 2026, it announced a $500 million Series A funding round led by venture capital firms including Accel and Andreessen Horowitz. In May 2026, the company raised another $400 million, bringing total funding to over $1 billion.
