= Rivian R3 =

Upcoming American electric compact SUV

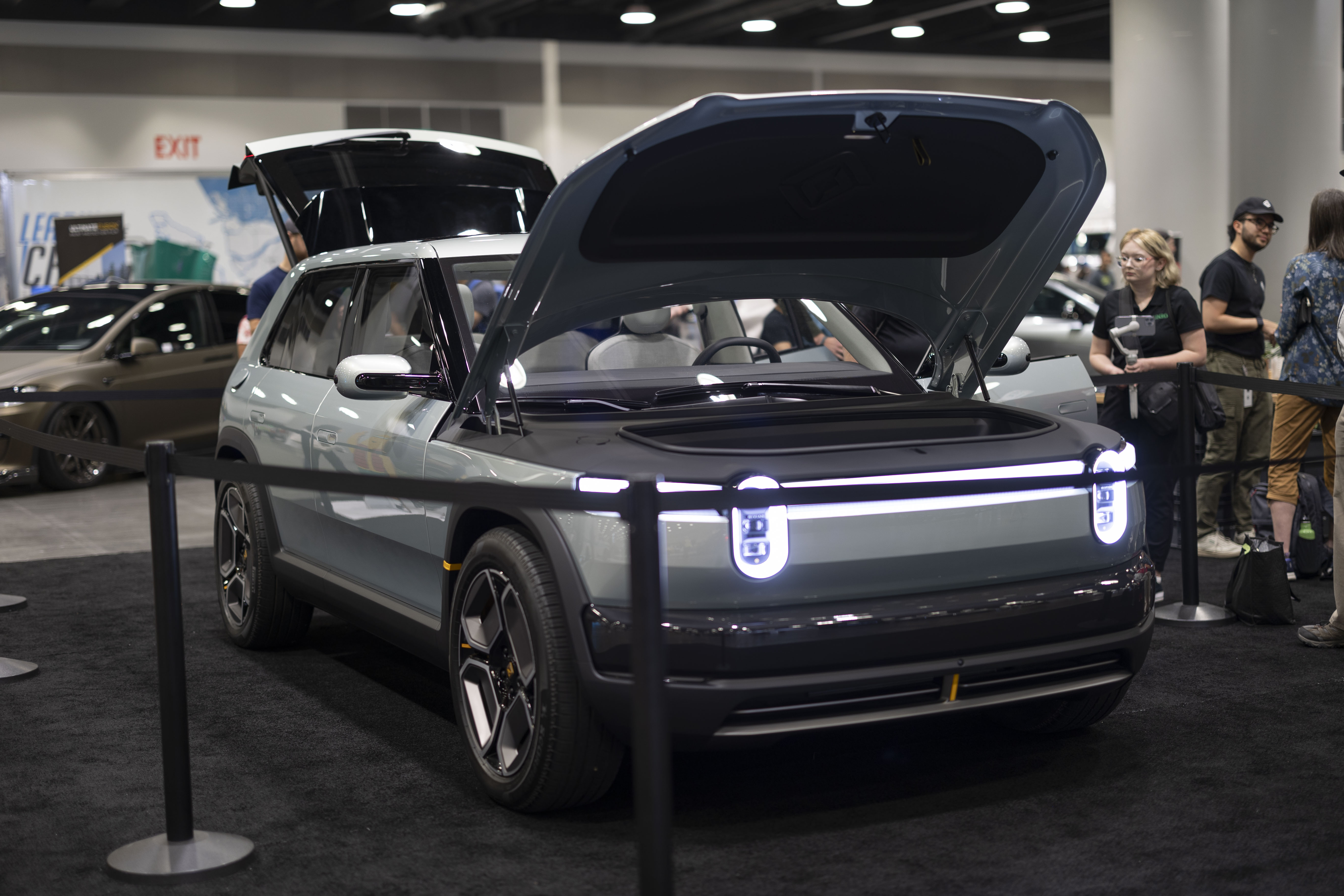
- Rivian R3 at Everything Electric Canada 2024

Overview
- Manufacturer: Rivian Automotive
- Production: TBA
- Model years: TBA
- Assembly: TBA
- Designer: Julliana Cho under Jeff Hammoud

Body and chassis
- Class: Compact SUV
- Body style: 5-door SUV
- Platform: Rivian Midsize Platform (MSP)
- Doors: 5 doors
- Related: Rivian R2

Powertrain
- Transmission: Single-speed
- Plug-in charging: North American Charging System

Dimensions
- Wheelbase: 2,799 mm (110.2 in)

The Rivian R3 is an upcoming all-electric compact SUV to be produced by American electric vehicle manufacturer Rivian.

== Overview ==
The Rivian R3 was revealed on March 7, 2024—alongside its R3X off-road oriented counterpart and the larger R2 mid-size SUV—as the company's entry-level model. The MSRP has not been announced, although Rivian has said that it will start at less than the R2's starting price, which the company expects to be around $45,000.

Rivian's chief design officer, Jeff Hammoud, says that the angular hatchback design of the R3 and R3X is inspired by 1980s Group B rally cars, such as the Audi Quattro and Lancia Delta Integrale.

== Specifications ==
Specific battery and charging details for the R3 have not yet been revealed by Rivian. The company says that it will be offered with two different battery packs, with the larger pack exceeding 300 mi (480 km) in range. The R3 charges using the North American Charging System (NACS) and supports the Combined Charging System (CCS) with an adapter. Rivian has stated that, with an undisclosed direct current fast charger, the R3 could be charged from 10% battery capacity to 80% in less than 30 minutes.

Rivian has not yet revealed the different trim levels that the R3 will be available with, only saying that there will be three different powertrains: single-motor, dual-motor, and tri-motor. The tri-motor model will have one front-mounted motor with another two in the rear and will have a 0–60 mph (0–97 km/h) acceleration time of about 3 seconds.

== R3X ==
The Rivian R3X is an outdoor recreation variant of the standard R3 model. Specific details regarding the R3X have not yet been revealed from Rivian, however it is intended to have higher performance and ground clearance than the R3 and features different wheels and bumpers as well as unique two-tone accents throughout the vehicle.
