= Willie Tillman =

American football coach (born c. 1976)

Current position
- Title: Head coach
- Team: Melbourne Central Catholic HS (FL)
- Record: 8–3

Biographical details
- Born: c. 1976 (age 49–50); Melbourne, Florida, U.S.
- Education: Purdue University (1998)

Playing career

Football
- 1994–1997: Purdue
- 2000: Roanoke Steam
- Position: Wide receiver

Coaching career (HC unless noted)

Football
- 1998: Purdue (GA)
- 1999: Maine Maritime (QB/WR)
- 2000: Anderson (IN) (DB)
- 2003: Bethel (TN) (DB)
- 2004–2006: Bethel (TN) (DC/DB)
- 2007: Florida A&M (DB)
- 2008: Murray State (WR)
- 2009: Merritt Island HS (FL) (DC/DB)
- 2010–2011: Bethel (TN) (assoc. HC/DC)
- 2012–2015: Florida Tech (DC/OLB)
- 2016: Westminster Academy (FL)
- 2017: Valdosta State (DL)
- 2018–2020: Lakewood HS (FL) (assoc. HC/OC/QB)
- 2021 (spring): Trinity International (DC)
- 2021–2022: Trinity International
- 2023: Ave Maria (LB)
- 2024–present: Melbourne Central Catholic HS (FL)

Basketball
- 2001–2003: Florida Southern (assistant)

Head coaching record
- Overall: 4–18 (college); 13–7 (high school)

Willie Jamel Tillman (born c. 1976) is an American college football coach. He is the head football coach for Melbourne Central Catholic High School, a position he has held since 2024. He was the head football coach for Westminster Academy in 2016 and Trinity International University from 2021 to 2022. He also coached for Purdue, Maine Maritime, Anderson (IN), Bethel (TN), Florida A&M, Murray State, Merritt Island High School, Florida Tech, Valdosta State, Lakewood High School, and Ave Maria. He played college football for Purdue as a wide receiver and professionally for the Roanoke Steam of the AF2.

== Head coaching record ==
=== College ===
Year	Team	Overall	Conference	Standing	Bowl/playoffs
Trinity International Trojans (Mid-States Football Association) (2021–2022)
2021	Trinity International	3–8	1–6	T–7th (MWL)	
2022	Trinity International	1–10	1–6	T–7th (MWL)	
Trinity International:		4–18	2–12		
Total:		4–18			

=== High school ===
Year	Team	Overall	Conference	Standing	Bowl/playoffs
Westminster Academy Lions () (2016)
2016	Westminster Academy	5–4	5–4	5th	
Westminster Academy:		5–4	5–4		
Melbourne Central Catholic Hustlers () (2024–present)
2024	Melbourne Central Catholic	8–3	4–0	1st	
Melbourne Central Catholic:		8–3	4–0		
Total:		13–7			
National championship Conference title Conference division title or championship game berth
