= Melbourne Central Catholic High School =

Location
- 154 East Florida Avenue; Melbourne, (Brevard County), Florida 32901; United States; 28°3′27″N 80°37′11″W

Information
- School type: Private, coeducational Diocesan Catholic High School
- Motto: Academic Excellence. Spiritual Integrity
- Religious affiliation: Roman Catholic
- Patron saint: St. Francis of Assisi
- Established: 1961
- Founder: Reverend Peter Dolan
- School board: Board of Directors
- Authority: Diocese of Orlando
- Superintendent: Dr. Erika Wikstrom
- President: Nicholas Regina
- Dean: Jason Armstrong
- Principal: Dana Johnston
- Staff: 54
- Faculty: 32
- Teaching staff: 32
- Grades: 9–12
- Gender: Co-Educational
- Enrollment: 470 (2026-27)
  - Grade 9: 124
  - Grade 10: 114
  - Grade 11: 138
  - Grade 12: 94
- Average class size: 22
- Student to teacher ratio: 15:1
- Education system: Diocese of Orlando
- Classes offered: Honors, Advanced Placement, College Prep, Academic Support
- Hours in school day: 8:00 AM - 3:00 PM
- Campus size: 44 Acres
- Colors: Green & gold
- Slogan: Academic Excellence. Spiritual Integrity.
- Athletics: Baseball, basketball, bowling, cheerleading, cross country, flag football, football, golf, lacrosse, soccer, softball, swimming, tennis, track & field and volleyball (girls).
- Mascot: Hustler (Bee)
- Nickname: MCC
- Team name: Hustlers
- Accreditation: Florida Catholic Conference, Cognia
- Yearbook: Lucerna
- Tuition: 15,870
- Graduates: 5,500
- Affiliation: Diocese of Orlando
- Website: melbournecc.org

Melbourne Central Catholic (MCC) is an American private, Roman Catholic, coed college-preparatory school high school located in Melbourne, in Brevard County, Florida.

== Campus ==
44 acre campus includes three classroom buildings—St. Thomas Aquinas Hall (Math, Science, History, and World Language classrooms), St. Elizabeth Hall (Theology and English classrooms), and St. Bonaventure Hall (Science, Art, and Music classrooms). St. Teresa Hall (Academic Support Center), St. Anthony Hall (Guidance), the Sullivan Center (Campus Ministry/Chapel), Hurley Hall (Gymnasium), St. Clare Hall (Media Center), Erdman Field House, and Donovan Commons (Administration) round out the campus.

== Sports ==
20 varsity athletic programs. Athletes with distinguished accomplishments have their name recognized on a plaque in the MCC Athletic Walk of Fame

=== FHSAA State Championships ===
- Boys Baseball - 2013, 2019
- Boys Basketball - 1973
- Girls Basketball - 2002
- Boys Soccer - 1998, 2003
- Girls Soccer - 2003, 2004

== Partner Middle Schools ==
The majority of students come from Ascension Catholic School, Holy Name of Jesus Catholic School, Our Lady of Lourdes Catholic School, Our Saviour Catholic School, St.Joseph Catholic School, St. Mary Catholic School, and St. Teresa Catholic School

== Notable alumni ==
- Thad Altman, Florida State Senator
- Vinny Capra, MLB player for the Chicago White Sox
- Kate Chastain, Private Jet & Yachting Chief Steward; Published Author; Below Deck Television Show Personality
- RJ Scaringe, Founder and CEO of Rivian
- Rashawn Scott, former American football wide receiver for the Miami Dolphins
- Obi Toppin, NBA player for the Indiana Pacers.
- Zamari Walton, professional football cornerback
- Melissa Witek, '99, Miss Florida USA 2005 and contestant on NBC's Treasure Hunters
