= RJ Scaringe =

American engineer and businessman (born 1983)

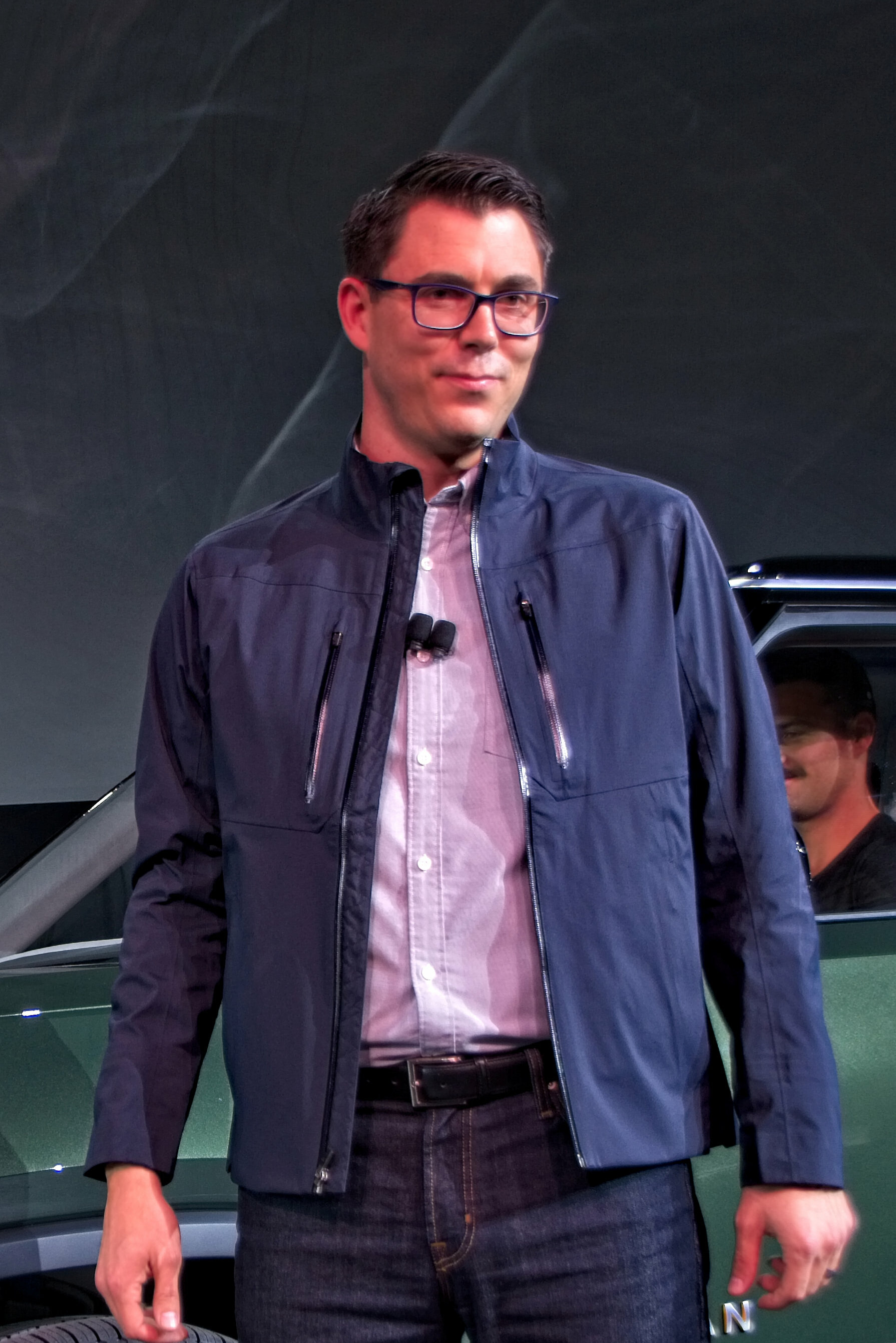
- Scaringe in 2018
- Born: Robert Joseph Scaringe; January 19, 1983 (age 43); Rockledge, Florida, U.S.
- Education: Rensselaer Polytechnic Institute (BS); Massachusetts Institute of Technology (MS, PhD)
- Occupation: Engineer
- Title: CEO of Rivian Automotive, Inc.
- Spouse: Meagan McGone (m. 2014; div. 2025)
- Children: 3

Robert Joseph Scaringe (born January 19, 1983) is an American engineer and businessman who is the founder and chief executive officer (CEO) of electric vehicle manufacturer Rivian and Mind Robotics.

== Early life ==
Robert Joseph Scaringe was born on January 19, 1983. His father, also named Robert Scaringe, is an engineer and founder of Mainstream Engineering Corporation. Scaringe grew up a car enthusiast, restoring them in his neighbor's garage. After learning of the great negative environmental effects of cars, however, he decided to focus his life on creating a more sustainable and environmentally friendly transportation system.

Scaringe grew up in Melbourne, Florida. He attended Melbourne Central Catholic High School. Scaringe received his bachelor's degree in mechanical engineering from Rensselaer Polytechnic Institute. He then received a master's degree in mechanical engineering at the Massachusetts Institute of Technology (MIT) and went on to also receive a doctorate in mechanical engineering at MIT's Sloan Automotive Lab.

== Career ==
Scaringe returned to Rockledge, Florida, and founded Mainstream Motors in the year of 2009 as the sole employee. The name of the company changed to Rivian Automotive in 2011.

In November 2021, Rivian went public, listing its shares on the Nasdaq.

Scaringe is chairman of the board and has 9.5% voting power. Additionally, he has veto power over board decisions due to his 100% ownership of the company's class B shares. In total, Scaringe owns about 1.4% of Rivian.

== Personal life ==
Scaringe married Meagan McGone in Michigan in August 2014. The couple have three children together. Scaringe stated in 2019 that due to his responsibilities as a start-up founder, he spends approximately 5% of his time with his wife and children. Scaringe and McGone divorced in 2025.

According to Forbes, Scaringe's net worth was estimated at $3.4 billion as of April 2021, but he lost his billionaire status in March 2022 due to Rivian's declining share value.
