= Rivian R2 =

American electric mid-size SUV

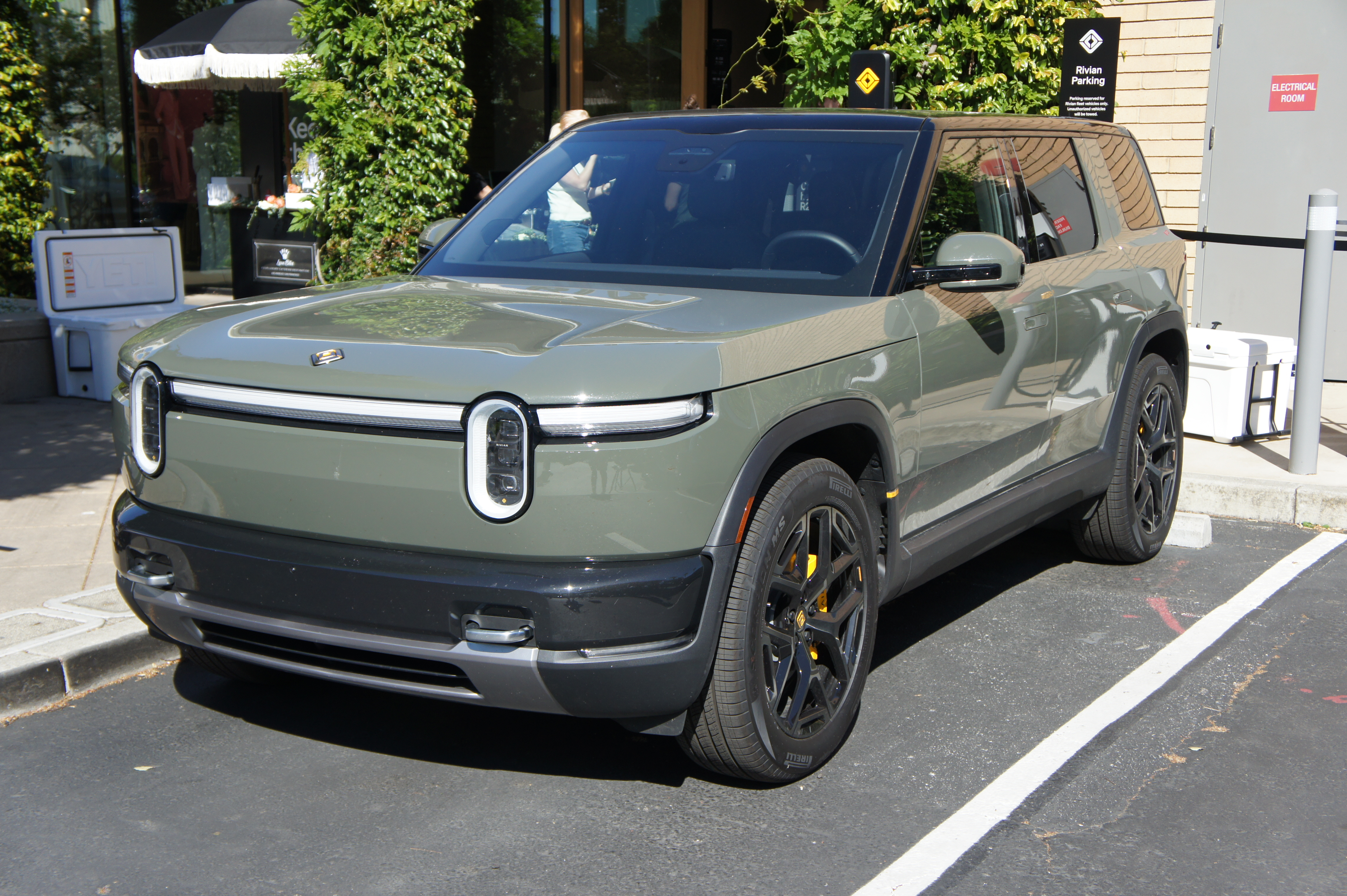

Overview
- Manufacturer: Rivian
- Production: April 2026–present
- Model years: 2027
- Assembly: United States: Normal, Illinois
- Designer: Jeff Hammoud

Body and chassis
- Class: Mid-size SUV
- Body style: 5-door SUV
- Layout: Rear-motor, rear-wheel-drive; Dual-motor, all-wheel-drive
- Platform: Rivian Midsize Platform (MSP)
- Related: Rivian R3

Powertrain
- Transmission: Single-speed
- Battery: 87.9 kWh NMC LGES
- Electric range: 307–345 mi (494–555 km) (EPA)
- Plug-in charging: NACS: 210 kW (DC)

Dimensions
- Wheelbase: 2,935 mm (115.6 in)
- Length: 4,715 mm (185.6 in)
- Width: 1,905 mm (75.0 in)
- Height: 1,700 mm (67 in)
- Curb weight: 4,998–5,016 lb (2,267–2,275 kg)

The Rivian R2 is a battery electric mid-size SUV produced by American electric vehicle manufacturer Rivian since 2026. It is a two-row, five-passenger vehicle, slotted under the R1S.

The Rivian R2 was announced on March 7, 2024, alongside the smaller R3, a compact SUV. More than 68,000 reservations for the R2 were made within 24 hours of its announcement. The vehicle was planned for global sales, including expansion into Europe beyond Rivian's existing markets in the United States and Canada.

Pricing was announced at SXSW on March 12, 2026. Production began in April 2026, and customer deliveries began in June of that year.

== Specifications ==
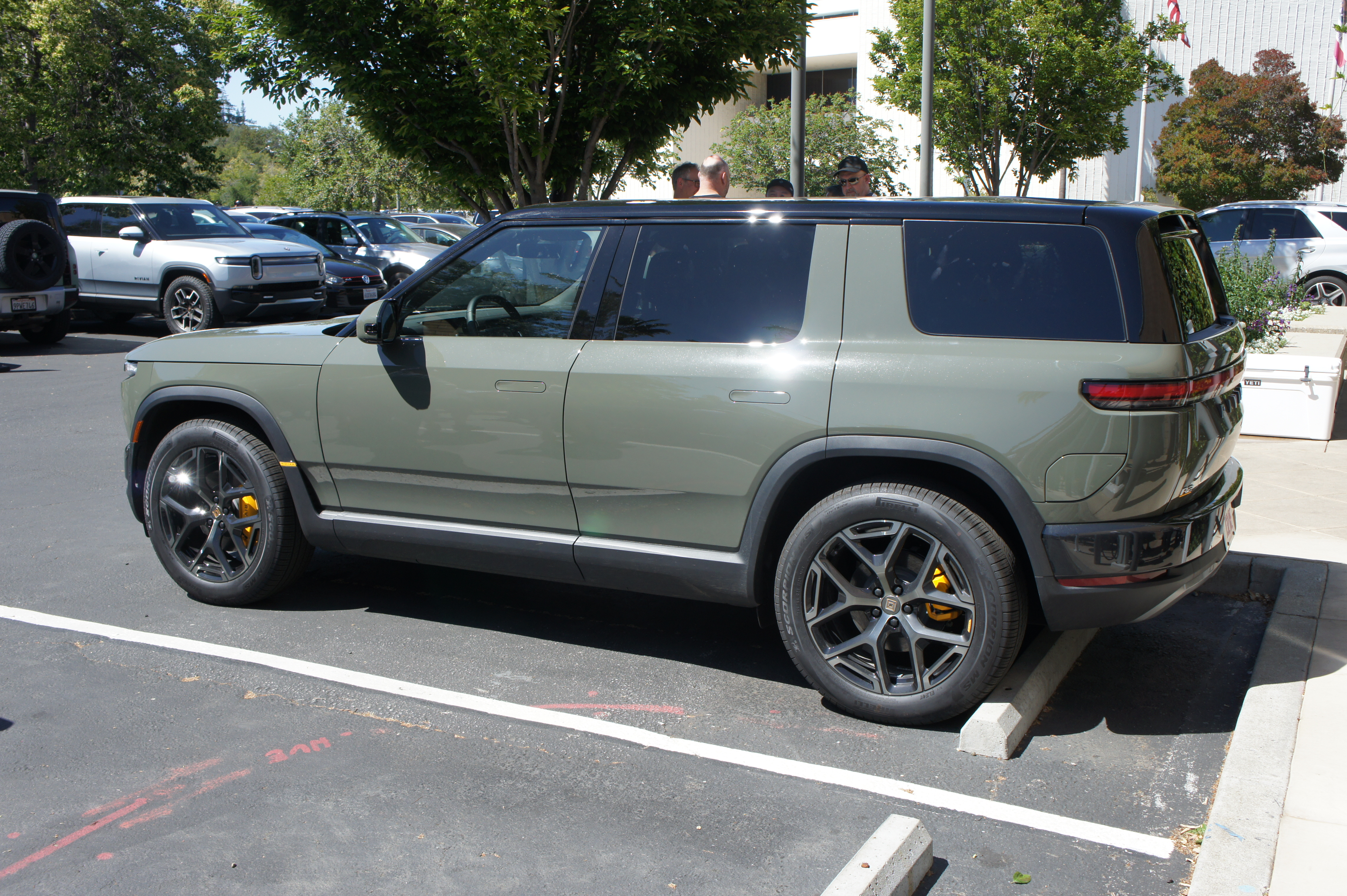
Rear view

=== Chassis, Suspension, and Handling ===
The R2 uses a MacPherson strut front suspension and multi-link rear suspension both using coil springs, with electronically controlled active dampers used in Performance models. It is available with wheels ranging between 19 and 21 inches and it uses a hydraulic brake-by-wire braking system. The R2 has 9.6 in (245 mm) of ground clearance and a turning diameter of 39.7 feet. Driving modes include All-Purpose, Conserve, Snow, and Sport, plus All-Terrain on higher trims.

=== Interior ===
The R2 has 57 cu ft (1,610 L) of front passenger space and 53 cu ft (1,500 L) of rear seat passenger volume. It has 29 cu ft (822 L) of rear cargo space, which expands to 79.4 cu ft (2,250 L) with the rear seats folded down, and is supplemented with 5.2 cu ft (146 L) of frunk space. Premium and Performance models are equipped with a power lowering rear tailgate window and a flashlight integrated into the door.

=== Exterior ===
The R2's exterior design shares styling elements with Rivian's R1 vehicles, including pill-shaped headlights and a boxy body shape. It is available with wheels ranging from 19 to 21 inches, depending on the trim and configuration.

Exterior paint options include Midnight, Glacier White, Esker Silver, Forest Green, Catalina Cove, and Half Moon Grey. Launch Green is also available with the Performance Launch package. Color availability and pricing vary by trim.

=== Infotainment ===
The R2 has a 15.6-inch central infotainment touchscreen that supports built-in navigation, Amazon Alexa, and Wi-Fi hotspot functionality, but does not support Apple Carplay or Android Auto integration. The 11.5-inch driver digital display is controlled via two Haptic Halo Wheels on the steering wheel. These can be rolled, tilted, or pressed to control functions such as climate settings, cruise control, drive modes, and mirror and steering wheel positions. The controls change their functions acccording to the active interface context.

The R2 uses RivianOS 2, which includes a redesigned infotainment interface. Its graphics use Unreal Engine 5, and its onboard computing hardware supports offline operation of Rivian's AI voice assistant. Connect+ subscribers have access to additional connected features, including a weather application and live trip management through the Rivian mobile app.

Standard models have a 525-watt five-speaker audio system, while Premium and Performance models feature a 900-watt 13-speaker system.

=== Driver Assistance and Computing ===
The R2's driver-assistance hardware includes five millimeter-wave radars and 11 cameras that support safety features like Automatic Emergency Breaking, Adaptive Cruise Control, and Lane Keeping Assist. Rivian offers its Autonomy+ driver-assistance package for a one-time payment or for a subscription. This service grants users upgraded capabilities such as Lane Change on Command and Universal Hands-Free, allowing hands-free driving across millions of miles of marked roads in the US and Canada.

Rivian has also announced a third-generation autonomy computer, known as ACM3, featuring a custom 5-nanometer processor developed in collaboration with Arm and TSMC. The company plans to pair this computer with a LiDARsensor mounted near the top of the windshield. The hardware is intended to improve the vehicle's ability to interpret its surroundings and support more advanced automated-driving functions. Initial R2 models launched without this upgraded computer and LiDAR hardware, which were planned for a later production phase.

=== Powertrain ===
At launch, all versions of the R2 use a 87.9 kWh usable (~94 kWh gross) liquid-cooled NMCA battery pack. DC fast charging tops out at 210 kW on a 400-volt architecture, which delivers 10–80% in 29 minutes. It provides EPA range ratings of 345 mi (555 km) on rear-wheel drive models and 330 mi (531 km) on both all-wheel drive and Performance models, which drops to 307 mi (494 km) when equipped with all-terrain tires.

It is expected to feature LG Energy Solution-supplied 4695 cylindrical cells, a battery format that is claimed to offer greater energy density and improved thermal management compared to the R1's 2170 cells. These cells are 46 mm in diameter and 95 mm in height, and are claimed to provide over six times the energy capacity per cell. The pack is structured as 8 strings of 97 cells in series (776 cells in total), operating at 357 V nominal voltage. The battery pack is a structural battery pack with non-serviceable cell section, but a serviceable powerhouse section for highly integrated power electronics, accessible from a panel under the 2nd row seats.

The R2 uses permanent-magnet synchronous AC motors with single-speed direct drive transmissions. Standard models are equipped with a single 350 hp (261 kW; 355 PS) rear motor. The Performance model uses a 291 hp (217 kW; 295 PS) front motor and 362 hp (270 kW; 367 PS) rear motor for a total of 656 hp (489 kW; 665 PS).

With the optional tow package, it has a towing capacity of up to 4,400 lb (2,000 kg) braked and 1,653 lb (750 kg)unbraked.

=== Engineering and vehicle architecture ===
Rivian made changes to the R2's electrical architecture to reduce manufacturing costs and vehicle weight. The vehicle uses a simplified wiring harness and a revised arrangement of electronic control units compared with earlier Rivian models. The wiring changes removed over 2.3 miles of wiring and reduced the vehicle's weight by around 44 pounds. The R2 also uses a 400-volt electrical architecure rather than an 800-volt system, helping to reduce costs while limiting its DC fast-charging rate.

Specifications
Configuration	Battery		Power	Torque	0–60 mph	Range	Top Speed
Configuration	Type	Weight	Power	Torque	0–60 mph	EPA	Top Speed
Standard			350 hp (261 kW; 355 PS)	355 lb⋅ft (481 N⋅m)	5.9 sec	Over 275 mi (443 km) (preliminary)	—
Standard Long Range	87.9 kWh NMCA LG ES	541 kg (1,193 lb)	350 hp (261 kW; 355 PS)	355 lb⋅ft (481 N⋅m)	5.9 sec	345 mi (555 km)	—
Dual-motor AWD	87.9 kWh NMCA LG ES	541 kg (1,193 lb)	450 hp (336 kW; 456 PS)	537 lb⋅ft (728 N⋅m)	4.6 sec	330 mi (531 km)	—
Performance (dual-motor)	87.9 kWh NMCA LG ES	541 kg (1,193 lb)	656 hp (489 kW; 665 PS)	609 lb⋅ft (826 N⋅m)	3.6–3.7 sec	307–330 mi (494–531 km)	110–112 mph

== Trims/prices ==
Initial pricing:

Trims
Trim	Drivetrain	Starting Price	Availability
Standard	Single-motor RWD	$46,495	Late 2027
Standard Long Range	Single-motor RWD (Note: Dual-motor AWD is available as an add-on.)	$49,985	2027
Premium	Dual-motor AWD	$55,485	Late 2026
Performance (Launch Edition)	Dual-motor AWD	$59,485	Spring 2026
