= Rivian =

American electric vehicle company

Rivian Automotive, Inc.
- Formerly: Mainstream Motors; Avera Automotive
- Type: Public
- Traded as: Nasdaq: RIVN (Class A); Russell 1000 component
- ISIN: US76954A1034
- Industry: Automotive; Energy storage
- Founded: June 2009; 17 years ago in Rockledge, Florida, U.S.
- Founder: RJ Scaringe
- Headquarters: Irvine, California, U.S.
- Number of locations: 100 service centers (2026)
- Area served: North America
- Key people: RJ Scaringe (CEO)
- Products: Electric vehicles; Batteries
- Production output: ▼42,284 vehicles (2025)
- Services: Electric vehicle charging; Vehicle insurance; Software and services
- Revenue: ▲US$5.39 billion (2025)
- Operating income: ▼US$−3.585 billion (2025)
- Net income: ▼US$−3.585 billion (2025)
- Total assets: US$14.86 billion (2025)
- Total equity: US$6.56 billion (2024)
- Owner: Volkswagen Group (15.9%); Amazon (12.28%); Oryx Global (8.6%); Vanguard (5.1%)
- Number of employees: 14,861 (2024)
- Website: rivian.com

Rivian Automotive, Inc., is an American electric vehicle manufacturer and automotive technology company founded in 2009. It produces an electric sport utility vehicle (SUV) and a pickup truck, both on a "skateboard" platform that can support future vehicles and be adopted by other companies. They also produce an electric delivery van, the Rivian EDV. The EDV is sold to Amazon for its deliveries. It started deliveries of its R1T pickup truck in late 2021, R1S sport utility vehicle in 2023, and R2 midsize SUV in June 2026. The company also operates the Rivian Adventure Network, an open DC fast charging network in the United States.

Rivian is based in Irvine, California, with its manufacturing plant in Normal, Illinois, and other facilities in Palo Alto, California; Carson, California; Plymouth, Michigan; Vancouver, British Columbia; Wittmann, Arizona; Woking, England; and Belgrade, Serbia. Rivian has plans to build another US$5 billion factory in Social Circle, Georgia. The company raised over US$13.5 billion in financing following its initial public offering in November 2021.

== History ==
=== Beginnings (2009) ===
The company was founded in Rockledge, Florida in 2009 as Mainstream Motors by RJ Scaringe. After being renamed as Avera Automotive or Avera Motors, and finally Rivian Automotive in 2011 (a word play on the Indian River in Florida, where Scaringe grew up), the company began focusing on autonomous and electric vehicles.

Rivian's first car model was intended to be a sports car. This vehicle, dubbed the R1, was prototyped as a mid-engine hybrid coupe for the U.S. market, designed by Peter Stevens. However, it was shelved in late 2011 as Rivian looked to restart its business in an effort to have a larger impact on the automotive industry.

Rivian received a large investment and grew significantly in 2015, opening research facilities in Michigan and the San Francisco Bay Area. Shortly thereafter, Rivian began working exclusively on electric autonomous vehicles, in an attempt to build a network of related products. It also began gearing its prototypes toward the "ride-sharing and driverless car markets."

=== Setting up production (2016) ===
By September 2016, Rivian was negotiating to buy a manufacturing plant formerly owned by Mitsubishi Motors in Normal, Illinois. In January 2017, Rivian acquired the plant and its manufacturing machinery for $16 million, with the plant to become Rivian's primary North American manufacturing facility. Rivian's acquisition of a near production-ready facility instead of building a new factory has been likened to Tesla's acquisition of the NUMMI plant in California.

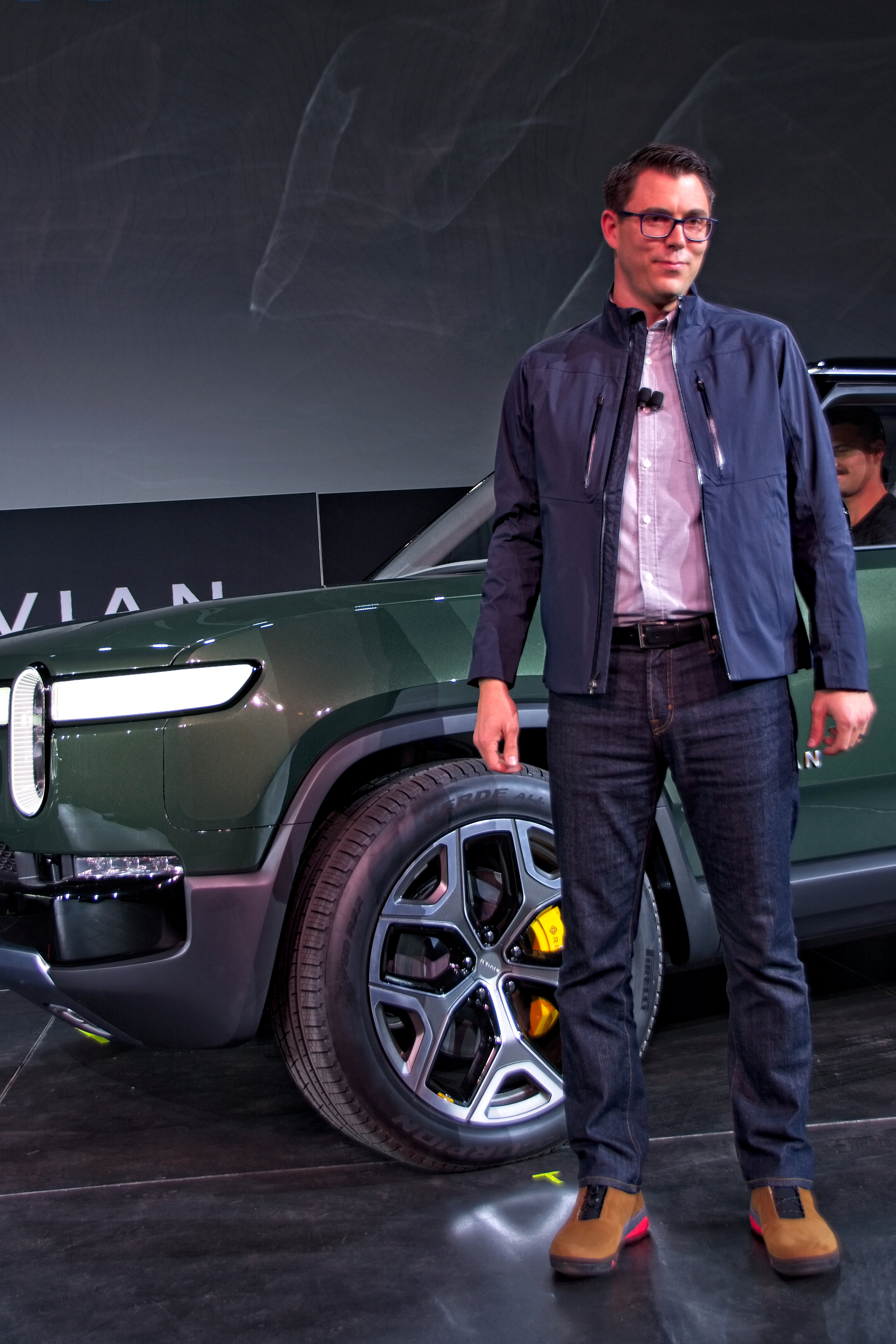
RJ Scaringe at the debut of the Rivian R1S SUV at the Los Angeles Auto Show, November 27, 2018

In December 2017, Rivian revealed its first two products: an electric five-passenger pickup truck and an electric seven-passenger SUV, provisionally named the A1T and A1C, respectively. In November 2018, the truck and SUV were renamed the R1T and R1S, respectively, and unveiled at the LA Auto Show. Both vehicles were described as ready for rough terrain and semi-autonomous, and the company outlined a plan for its next generation of models to be fully autonomous. Production was scheduled to begin in 2020.

Rivian had 250 employees at the start of 2018. By February 2019, Rivian was employing 750 people across facilities in Michigan, Illinois, California, and the United Kingdom. In November 2020, Rivian employed 3,000-plus workers. Over the span of another year, employment roughly tripled, and in November 2021, Rivian had 9,000-plus employees.

=== Shipment of first models, IPO, and expansion (2021) ===
In late 2020, Rivian planned to begin shipments of the R1T in June 2021. The June 2021 date later slipped to August. By August, vehicle shipments were delayed again, partly due to the global shortage of microchips. In September 2021, Rivian became the first automaker to bring a fully electric pickup to the consumer market, beating industry mainstays such as GM, Ford, and Tesla. In October 2021, Rivian began delivering the R1T truck to customers.

On November 10, 2021, Rivian became a public company through an IPO. 153 million shares were sold at an initial offering price of $78.00, valuing the company at $66.5 billion. The shares began trading on the Nasdaq under the ticker "RIVN". On its first trading day, the stock closed at $100.73 per share, valuing the company at just under $100 billion. On November 19, 2021, Ford and Rivian announced that the two automakers no longer plan to co-develop an electric vehicle. Ford announced the company would retain a 12 percent stake in Rivian, which reached a value of more than $10 billion after the IPO. Ford had sold around 90 percent of its stake in Rivian for $3 billion by the end of 2022, an increase from its $1.2 billion investment. In December 2021, at the same time that Rivian began to deliver its R1S SUVs, Rivian's chief operations officer, Rod Copes, stepped down and retired from the company as it began to ramp up production of its vehicles.

On March 1, 2022, Rivian announced price increases of 17% for the R1T and 20% for the R1S, citing a shortage of semiconductors and higher costs for other components. There was immediate backlash from customers that had previously made reservations as the price hike would also affect their preorders. Rivian later apologized for the retroactive price increases and stated that the original configured price would be honored for anyone with a Rivian preorder as of the March 1 pricing announcement. On March 14, 2022, Rivian announced the company hired Frank Klein as its COO (chief operations officer). Klein began on June 1, 2022.

In March 2022, Rivian made it to TIME's List of 100 Most Influential Companies of the year 2022. On July 27, 2022, Rivian announced it would reduce its workforce by 6% in response to high inflation, rising interest rates, and an increase in parts prices. In September 2022, Rivian signed an MoU with Mercedes-Benz Group to establish a joint venture to invest in and operate a factory in Europe, producing large commercial electric vans starting in a few years. The facility will have a common assembly line to produce a different design for each company. The New York Times characterized the move as "a rare example of cooperation between a traditional carmaker and a new challenger" and noted that Mercedes' extensive experience in manufacturing may allow Rivian to overcome its own issues with it. Rivian cancelled this planned partnership in December 2022, but stated that future collaborations may still be possible. After the company received seven reports of loose torque bolts that did not result in injury, in October 2022, Rivian issued a voluntary recall of 13,000 vehicles.

In January 2023, The Wall Street Journal reported the company experienced the departure of multiple top executives in recent months, including some who were among its longest-tenured employees, in what was referred to as a "challenging period for Rivian."

On June 20, 2023, Rivian announced that it would incorporate Tesla's electric vehicle charging standard, the North American Charging System (NACS) into its R1T trucks and R1S SUVs in 2025, as well as in its upcoming R2 platform. As early as the second quarter of 2024, Rivian owners may be able to use adapters to connect to Tesla's Supercharger network.

A day after the big NACS announcement, on June 21, Rivian announced the acquisition of Iternio, the Swedish mapping company known for its popular EV route-planning app, A Better Route Planner (ABRP), and integrated it into the in-car navigation system. In addition to Rivian mobile app integration, the company said it plans to maintain the standalone ABRP app.

In late 2023, it was reported that Amazon's total fleet size of the EDV had reached 10,000 units. In October 2023, the company also ended the exclusivity deal it had with Amazon, allowing Rivian to supply other commercial customers with its electric delivery vehicles. In December 2023 telecommunications company AT&T announced it would take delivery of the trucks from Rivian as part of a trial process for its fleet.

In October 2023 Rivian announced plans to open a new Georgia manufacturing facility with an annual production capacity of 400,000 units in early 2024. In March, 2026, plans for vertical construction to begin by the end of 2026 were announced for the Georgia facility at a meeting of the Joint Development Authority of Jasper, Morgan, Newton and Walton Counties.

=== Further expansion struggles, and partnership with Volkswagen (2024) ===
On February 21, 2024, Rivian announced it would be laying off 10% of its salaried workers beginning on February 23, 2024.

In March 2024, the project to open a factory in Georgia was put on hold for financial reasons. It was started up again in November 2024 when the federal government under the Biden Administration announced a $6 billion loan for the factory.

On March 7, 2024, Rivian unveiled the R2 SUV that starts from $45,000, much less than current models, and the R3, that will cost even less than the R2.

On June 25, 2024, Volkswagen Group announced its intention to invest up to $5 billion in Rivian. The investment will commence with an initial $1 billion, with an additional $4 billion anticipated by 2026. This commitment includes $1 billion slated for each of 2025 and 2026, followed by an additional $2 billion in 2026 earmarked for a prospective joint venture aimed at developing electrical architecture and software technology.

Rivian and Volkswagen Group officially launched a joint venture to develop next-generation software-defined vehicle platforms, combining Rivian’s software and Volkswagen’s global scale and manufacturing capabilities.

It was reported on July 29, 2024, that Germany's competition authority gave green light to the form of the joint venture by the two companies.

In February 2025, Rivian opened orders for their Electric Commercial Van (ECV) to businesses managing fleets.

In July 2025, Rivian announced plans to establish an East Coast headquarters at the Junction Krog District building adjacent to the Eastside Beltline in Atlanta, Georgia. The 45,000 ft^{2} (4,200 m^{2}) office is set to open in late 2025 with plans to accommodate 500 employees by the end of 2026.

For the first quarter of 2026, Rivian produced 10,236 vehicles and delivered 10,365, figures that the company stated were in line with its internal projections. Following the release of these results on April 2, 2026, the company reaffirmed its annual delivery guidance of between 62,000 and 67,000 vehicles for the 2026 fiscal year.

In June 2026, Rivian began customer deliveries of the R2, its midsize electric SUV and first vehicle built on its midsize platform. The R2 was introduced as the company's first lower-priced mass-market model and was viewed as central to Rivian's long-term growth strategy.

In July 2026, Rivian reported second-quarter deliveries of 12,194 vehicles and increased its full-year 2026 delivery guidance to between 65,000 and 70,000 vehicles, citing stronger-than-expected demand for the R1 lineup, commercial vans, and the newly launched R2.

=== Entry into autonomous vehicles (2025) ===
In December 2025, Rivian announced that it will be hosting its first "Autonomy and AI Day" to showcase their autonomous capabilities with their end-to-end AI-centric approach, which they believe will help them improve profitability.

In an interview by Fortune on December 9, 2025, Rivian CEO RJ Scaringe announced his goal of creating an autonomous vehicle (AV) that goes beyond driving, and that is able to run and coordinate tasks and errands for people.

== Vehicles ==
Designed to be capable off-road, both R1 models have 14 in (360 mm) of ground clearance. The truck was claimed in early testing to be able to accelerate from 0–60 mph (0–97 km/h) in under 3 seconds, wade through 3 ft 7 in (1.1 m) of water and climb a 45 degree incline. The initial truck on offer had a motor at each of the four wheels, and like some competitors, each wheel can be controlled interdependently. According to Engadget in 2021, "the most expensive models were expected to reach around 450 miles [720 km] on a charge and feature [an] 800HP [600 kW] electric motor Scaringe stated would beat Italian supercars." Rivian has said it is designing the vehicles to facilitate carsharing with their autonomous features. In addition, Rivian announced the intention to make an electric delivery van (EDV) in three different sizes, capable of carrying 500, 700 or 900 cubic feet (14, 20 or 25 m^{3}) of packages. All three EDVs would share their basic electrical and network architecture, ECUs and battery packs with the Rivian R1 models.

In December 2021, Rivian reported that it had over 71,000 pre-orders for its R1 models. They produced a total of 24,337 cars in 2022.

=== R1T ===
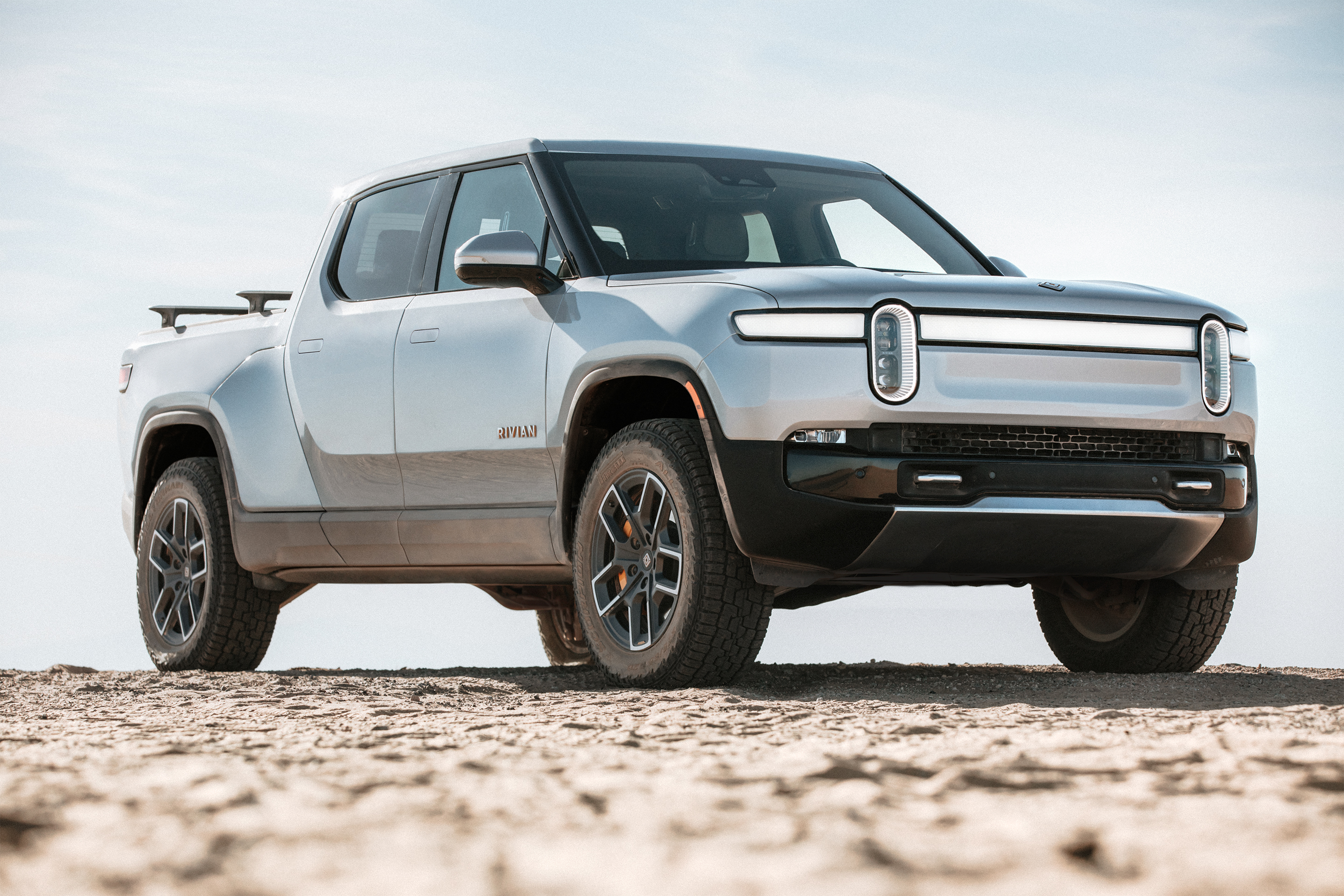
Rivian R1T

The R1T is a body-on-frame pickup truck, which features an independent air suspension with hydraulic roll control and up to four electric motors, with up to two located on each axle (front and rear). The R1T Quad produces 1,025 hp (764 kW) and 1,198 lb⋅ft (1,624 N⋅m) of torque. The result in 2021 was a Rivian-claimed 0–60 mph (97 km/h) time of 2.6 seconds.

The Rivian R1T is available in two battery sizes: 108 kWh and 140 kWh. The 2026 R1T has a projected range of 329 miles (529 km) with the Large Pack and 410 miles (660 km) with the Max Pack.

In December 2021, the R1T was named the Motor Trend Truck of the Year.

=== R1S ===
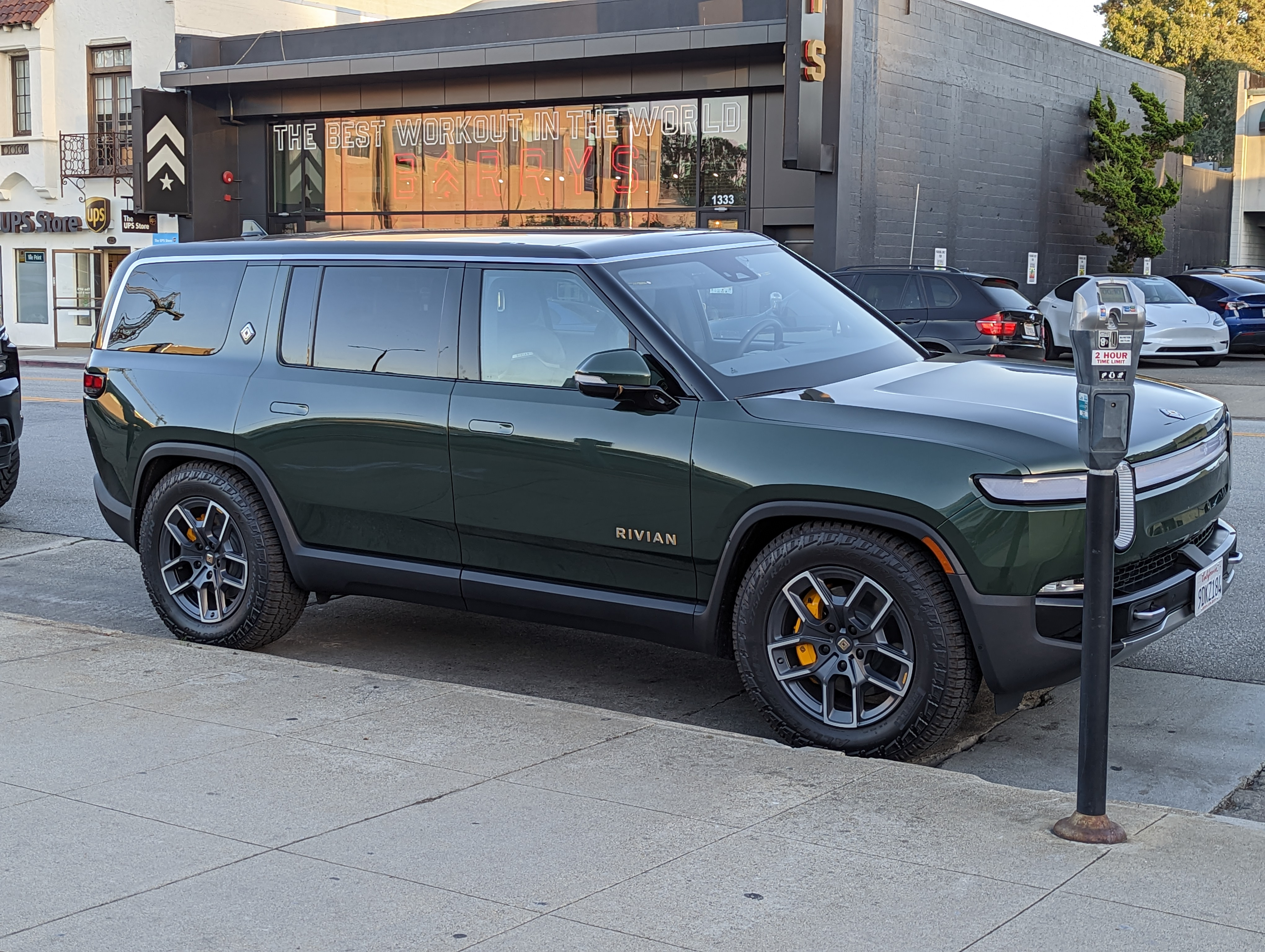
Rivian R1S

The R1S is a sport utility vehicle version of the R1 platform. Because of a shared electric chassis, the R1S design aimed, as of 2018, to have 91 percent shared components with the R1T. The chassis includes braking, suspension and cooling systems with a battery in the center. Rivian's skateboard platform is a relatively flat, low center of gravity chassis typical of electric vehicles, which enables straightforward modification for different body types.

=== Electric Delivery Van (EDV) and Rivian Commercial Van (RCV) ===
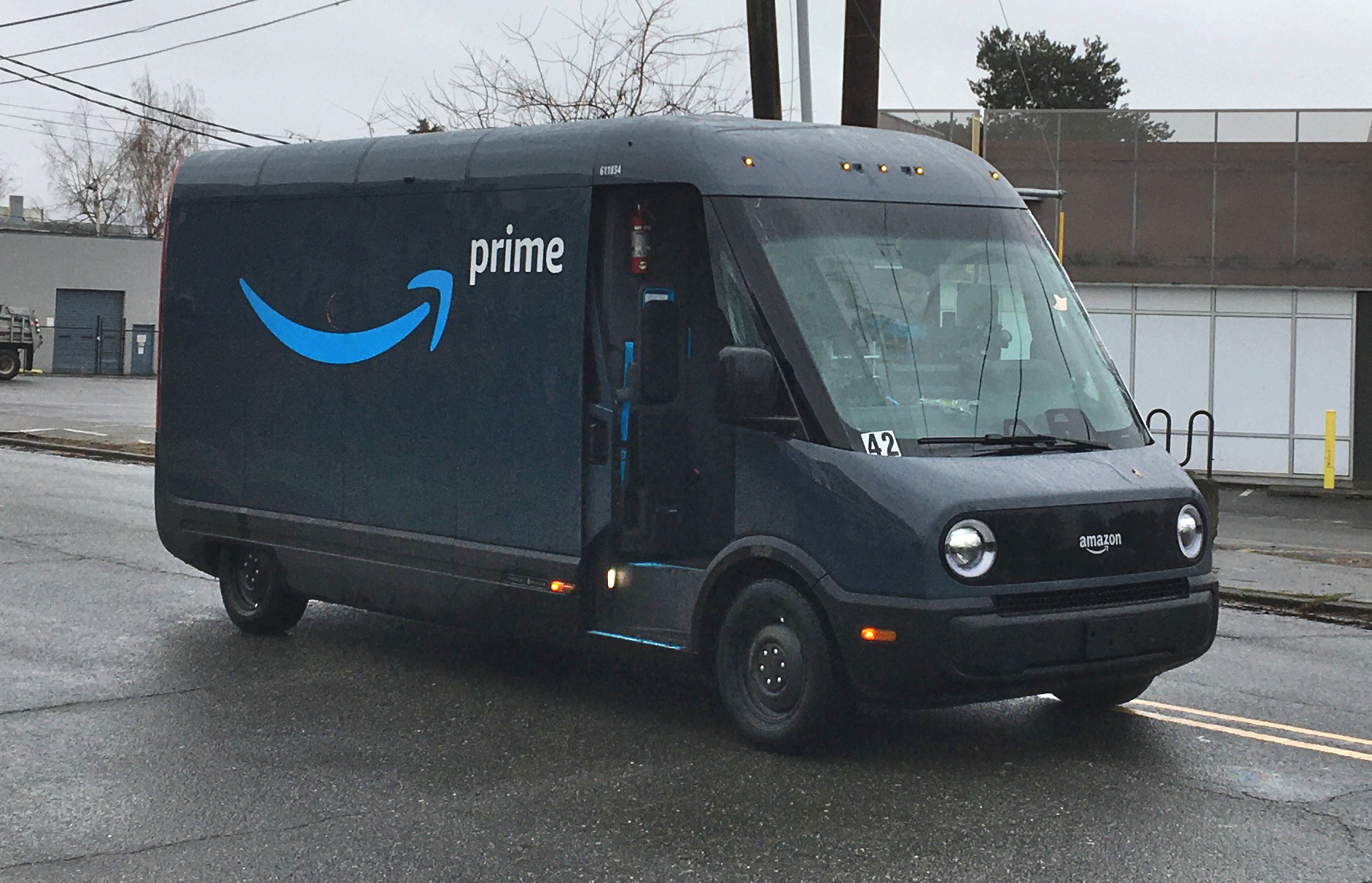
Rivian EDV

Rivian entered into a commercial agreement with its investor Amazon, Inc. in February 2019. By September 2019, Amazon's Logistics division had agreed to collaborate with Rivian to design, produce, and purchase 100,000 electric delivery vehicles (EDVs). Initial plans suggested a first delivery date in 2021. As of 2019, Amazon expected to have as many as 10,000 electric vans in operation by 2022, but was not planning to take delivery of the entire 100,000 Rivian vans the contract calls for until 2030. In November 2022, Rivian announced that it had delivered 1,000 EDVs to Amazon. In 2026 Amazon announced that it reached half of its goal and had over 50,000 EV delivery vans in its fleet. The Rivian collaboration is part of Amazon's plan to convert its delivery fleet to 100% renewable energy by 2030.

The van is slated to be built in three sizes, carrying 14 m^{3} (500 ft^{3}), 20 m^{3} (700 ft^{3}), or 25 m^{3} (900 ft^{3}) of packages, each with the same stand-up interior height, but with a narrower smallest model. All of the vans will be built on the same platform, which shares the same electrical and network architecture, ECUs, and battery-pack design with the Rivian R1T/R1S models; most will use a basic single-motor e-axle drive unit driving the front wheels. The van is to be produced exclusively for Amazon initially, and will be built with a steel chassis, as opposed to the aluminum primarily used on the R1T and R1S. The EDV assembly line is a "low-feature-content" assembly line to keep costs down. The van is explicitly designed to allow Amazon to reduce costs and shrink its carbon footprint.

A 150-mile (240 km) prototype for the Amazon electric delivery van was tested on public roads in early 2021. Testing began in Los Angeles and San Francisco. By April 2021, testing was being conducted in Colorado with plans to test in 16 U.S. cities in different climate zones. Tests in Oklahoma and Michigan were underway by July 2021. Amazon also will source electric vans and three-wheelers from other OEMs, such as Stellantis, Mercedes-Benz Group, and Mahindra. Deployment of the electric delivery vans began in nine U.S. cities in July 2022.

Under terms of a 2019 agreement, Rivian was required to sell all of the vans it makes to Amazon. In early 2023, it was reported that Amazon had notified Rivian that it wanted to buy about 10,000 vans during the year. As this was at the low end of a range previously provided to the auto maker, in response Rivian sought to remove the exclusivity terms of the agreement. By January 2024, Amazon agreed to end the exclusivity arrangement, allowing Rivian to be free to seek new commercial customers for the vans.

In February 2025, Rivian opened up orders for the vans to business fleet customers. Models sold for business fleets are branded as Rivian Commercial Vans (RCVs).

=== R2 ===
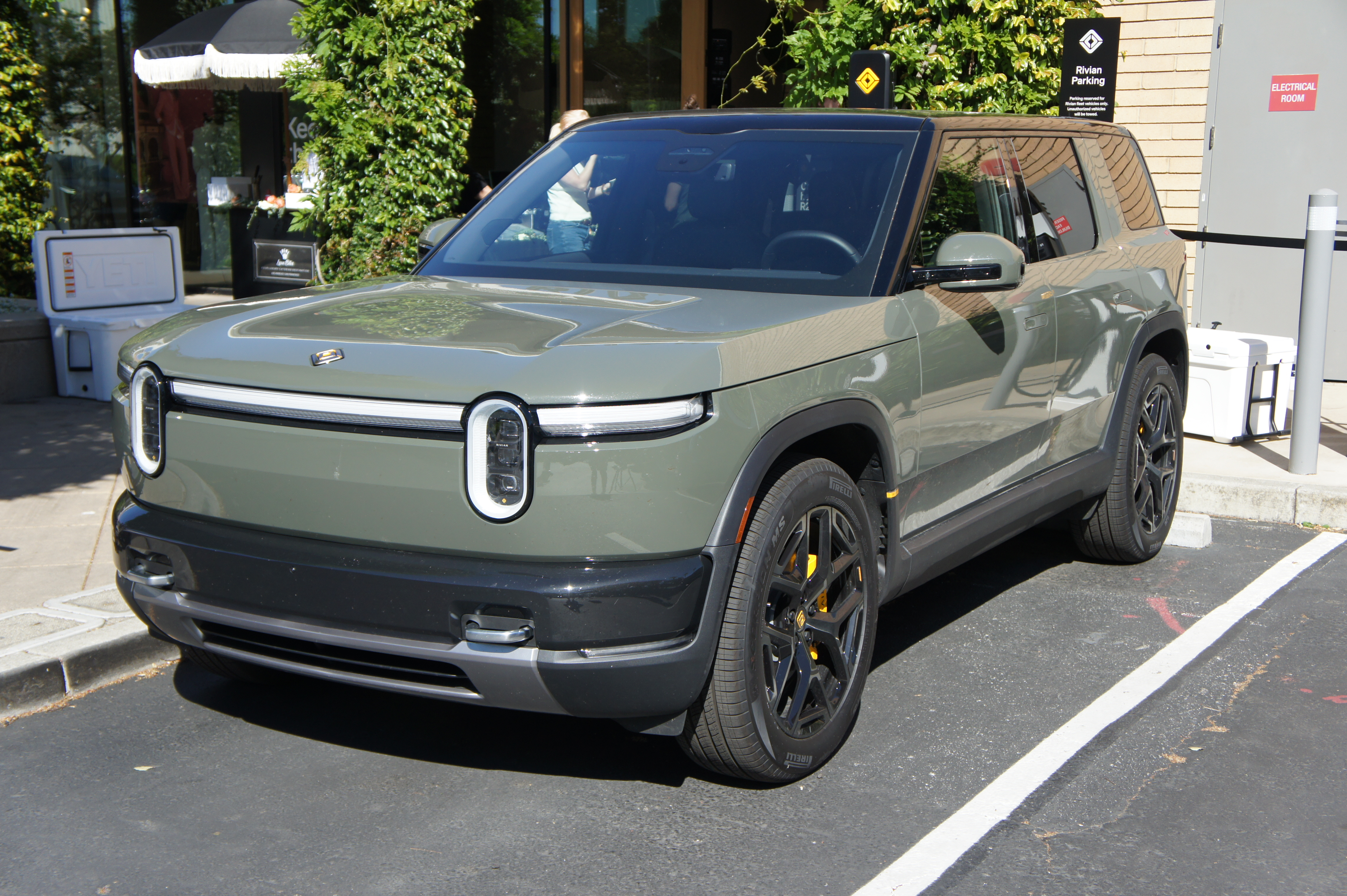
Rivian R2

The R2 is a smaller, less-expensive midsize SUV on a new platform. Rivian announced full trims and pricing for the R2 on March 12, 2026: the R2 Performance with Launch Package (dual-motor AWD, 656 hp, EPA-estimated range up to 330 miles, from $57,990, spring 2026); R2 Premium (dual-motor AWD, 450 hp, from $53,990, late 2026); and R2 Standard variants (single-motor RWD, from $48,490, arriving through 2027, with a lower-priced ~$45,000 version to follow in late 2027). The R2 has a native NACS charge port with access to the Tesla Supercharger network and CCS adapter support. Customer R2 production began at the Normal, Illinois, plant on April 22, 2026, and first customer deliveries began on June 9, 2026. Rivian's Georgia plant is expected to add R2-platform manufacturing capacity after it comes online in 2028.

=== R3 and R3X ===
The Rivian R3 is a planned compact electric crossover on the R2 midsize platform. As of mid-2026 it has not been priced and has no confirmed release date.

The Rivian R3X is a higher-performance variant of the R3 that will feature higher ground clearance and a tri-motor setup.

== EV charging ==
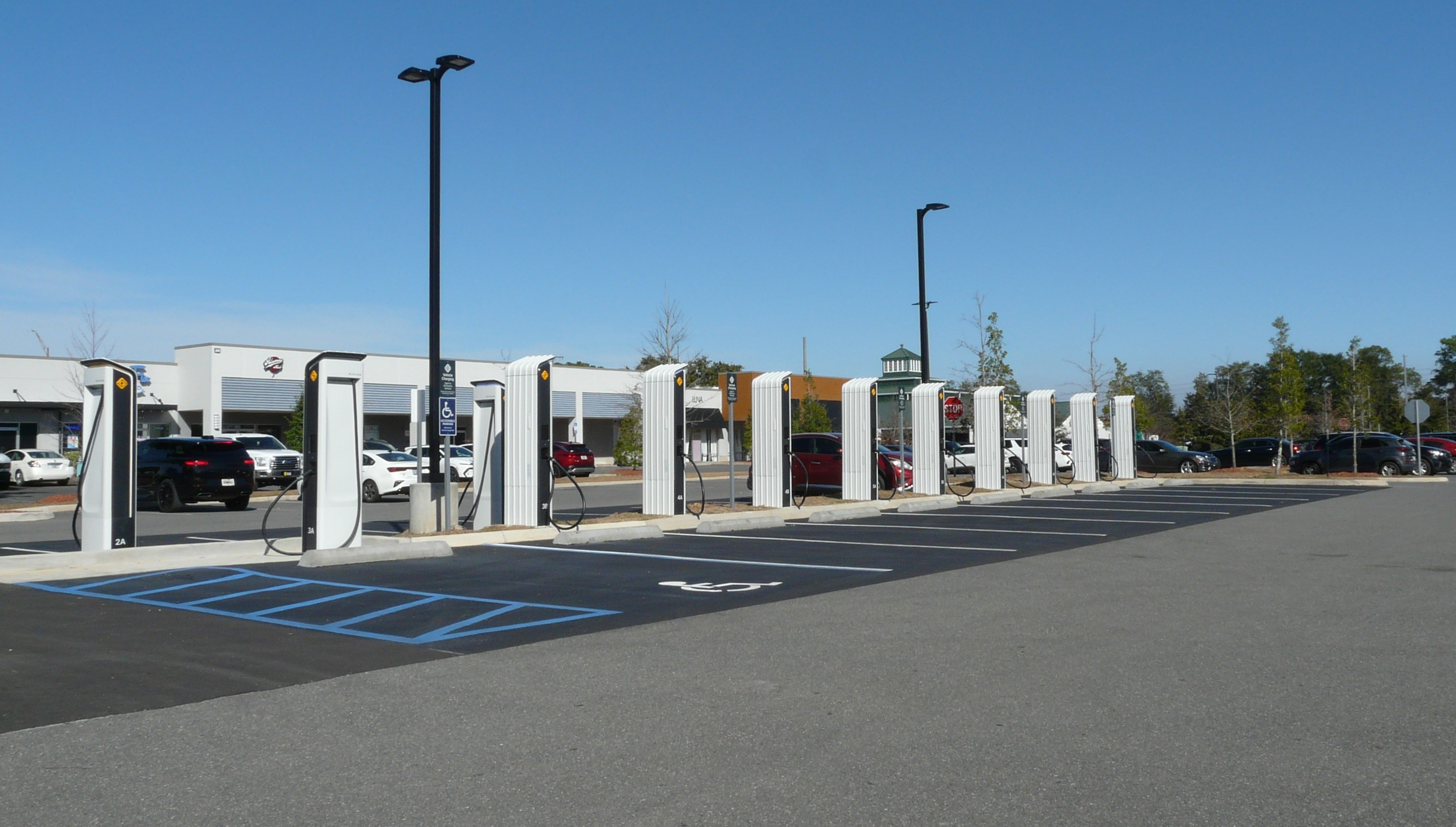
Rivian charging stations in Tallahassee, Florida

In March 2021, Rivian announced ambitious plans to develop the Rivian Adventure Network (RAN), a network of public charging stations across the United States and Canada by the end of 2023. Usage was initially restricted to Rivian owners only, but as of 2026, any EV with a CCS port or CCS adapter can use most Rivian chargers and many chargers are being converted to NACS.

The company is also planning 10,000 destination chargers (Level 2, 11.5 kW)—called "Rivian Waypoints"—at retail, lodging and dining businesses, as well as parks and other locations; Waypoint chargers are designed to be usable by all electric vehicles with a J1772 connector. Starting July 2021, Rivian planned to install two Rivian Waypoint chargers at up to 50 Colorado State Parks and state recreation areas. However, by October, none had yet been installed as the contract was still making its way through state government bureaucracy with first installations expected in early 2022. In September 2021, the first Waypoint 11.5 kW chargers were installed near Moab, Utah.

In July 2021, Rivian and the state of Tennessee announced plans to install Waypoint chargers at all 56 Tennessee state parks, saying that "Rivian will begin site surveys and engineering over the summer, with installation beginning as early as fall 2021". The first site, Radnor Lake State Park, was unveiled on October 1, 2021.

In June 2023 it was reported that Rivian adopted the North American Charging System for its vehicles in North America beginning in the 2026 model year.

As of 2026, Rivian had more than 50,000 CCS DC fast chargers across the United States, all powered by renewable energy.

== Facilities ==
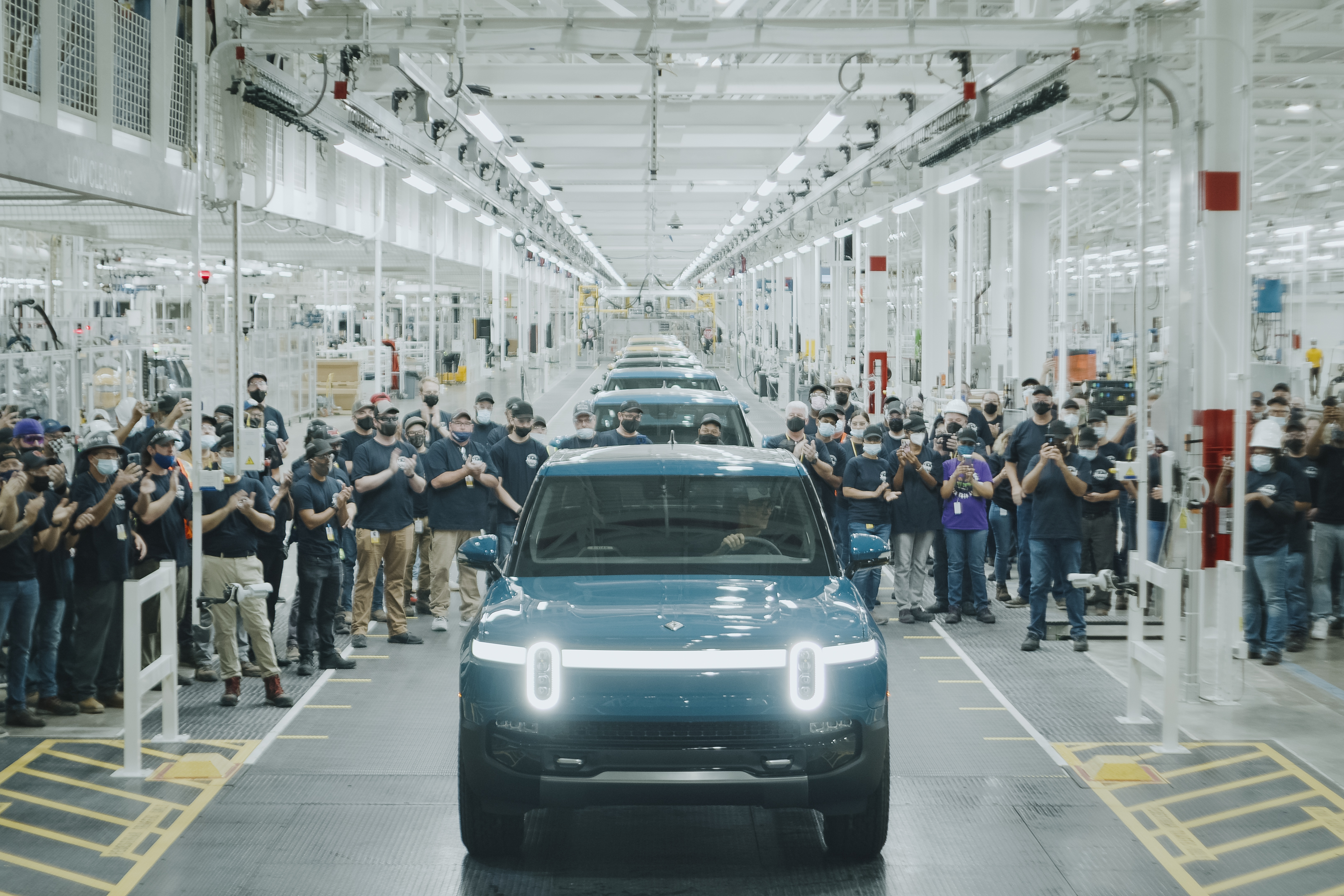
The first ever high volume manufactured electric Rivian R1T pickup rolls off the Normal, Illinois, assembly line, September 28, 2021

Rivian is headquartered in Irvine, California, with its location focusing on vehicle engineering and design, propulsion and battery system development, and commercial functions. Rivian's sole production factory in Normal, Illinois, manufactures vehicle components, such as battery packs. The 2.6-million-square-foot (240,000 m^{2}) plant has a paint shop, robotics, stamping machines, and other production equipment, such as injection molding. Rivian's facility in Plymouth, Michigan, focuses on vehicle engineering, prototyping, supply chain, and accounting. Rivian's facility in Palo Alto, California, focuses on software development and engineering, including self-driving features. The company has additional office locations in Carson, California, and Woking, England, working on electric power conversion and advanced engineering, respectively.

Rivian's Normal factory has steadily grown over the years. In July 2020, Rivian's plans for additions totaling 576,000 ft^{2} (53,500 m^{2}) its production facility were approved by the town council. In October 2021, Rivian made public plans to grow the facility with a 623,000 ft^{2} (57,900 m^{2}) addition to be built on the west side of the existing facility, which if built would bring the total Rivian facility size to 3,900,000 ft^{2} (360,000 m^{2}).

In December 2021, Rivian announced plans to build a $5 billion battery and assembly plant east of Atlanta. Construction is planned to begin in summer 2022 with car production beginning in 2024 with plans to manufacture up to 400,000 vehicles a year. The plant is currently projected to employ 7,500 workers with possible growth to 10,000 workers. Some locals are opposed to the Rivian plant with reasons such as environmental concerns and government costs, including Georgia proposing to allocate $125 million for costs associated with the factory. In early 2024, the company announced that it was putting on hold construction of the Georgia plant, the land for which had been at least 90% graded. For the present, all vehicles will continue to be made in the Normal plant.

== Vehicle sales ==
The chart below presents the quarterly sales of Rivian Electric Vehicles as per the data provided by the company in the shareholder letters for the financial years mentioned.

View chart definition.

The table below shows the cumulative total production of vehicles with the quarterly total production and total sales also shown.

Quarter	Cumulative production	Total production	Total sales
Q4 2021	1,003	1,003	909
Q1 2022	3,556	2,553	1,227
Q2 2022	7,957	4,401	4,467
Q3 2022	15,320	7,363	6,584
Q4 2022	25,340	10,020	8,054
Q1 2023	34,735	9,395	7,946
Q2 2023	48,727	13,992	12,640
Q3 2023	65,031	16,304	15,564
Q4 2023	82,572	17,541	13,972
Q1 2024	96,552	13,980	13,588
Q2 2024	106,164	9,612	13,790
Q3 2024	119,321	13,157	10,018
Q4 2024	132,048	12,727	14,183
Q1 2025	146,659	14,611	8,640
Q2 2025	152,638	5,979	10,661
Q3 2025	163,358	10,720	13,201
Q4 2025	174,332	10,974	9,745
Q1 2026	184,568	10,236	10,365
Q2 2026	197,181	12,613	12,194
Q3 2026	216,922	19,741	19,248

== Finances ==
As of December 2021, Rivian is a public company trading under the symbol RIVN on the Nasdaq stock exchange.

Year	Revenue (mil. USD)	Net income (mil. USD)	Total assets (mil. USD)	Employees ('000)	Sources
2020	0	−1,018	4,602		
2021	55	−4,688	22,294	11.5	
2022	1,658	−6,752	17,876		
2023	4,434	−5,432	16,778		
2024	4,970	−4,689	15,410		
2025	5,387	−3,585	14,864		

=== Funding ===
From initial seed stage capital invested by CEO Scaringe in 2009 to its final $2.5 billion round in 2021, Rivian secured 10 rounds of private funding to support the completion of development of line of its vehicles and build out to support production. On November 10, 2021, the company completed its initial public offering, raising $13.5 billion.

==== Private capital funding ====
In 2011, the company filed a Form D, reporting debts and warrants totaling $250,000. The following year, in 2012 the company filed a second Form D, reporting debts and warrants totaling $1 million Jeddah-based investment firm Abdul Latif Jameel claims to have been the company's earliest investor. From 2013 to 2016, there were no filings or announcements of funding for Rivian. Cumulative funding remained at $1.25 million.

In January 2017, at the time the company acquired the former Mitsubishi plant in Normal, Illinois, Rivian received a $1 million grant and a five-year tax abatement from Normal, contingent on meeting certain employment targets and investing $40.5 million over five years. Rivian also received $49.5 million in tax credits from the Illinois state government; these credits are also contingent upon meeting employment targets and investing at least $175 million into the site by 2024. Sumitomo Corporation made a "large strategic investment" in Rivian in December 2017. The amount was not disclosed. Announced on May 23, 2018, Rivian closed on $200 million in debt financing from Standard Chartered Bank, bringing total raised funds to upwards of $450 million. Other backers at the time included existing investors Abdul Latif Jameel and Sumitomo Corporation.

Announced on February 15, 2019, Amazon led an investment round of $700 million into Rivian. The round included participation from existing shareholders. Another announcement a couple months later on April 24, 2019, Ford Motor Company invested $500 million at a pre-money valuation of $4.5 billion. On September 10, 2019, Cox Automotive invested $350 million into Rivian, bringing the total raised in 2019 to $1.5 billion. Rivian remained independent, but Cox Automotive planned to add a representative to Rivian's board as part of the investment. On November 19, 2021, Ford and Rivian announced that they no longer plan to co-develop an electric vehicle. Originally, both companies had planned the joint development of a vehicle for Ford's luxury Lincoln brand. Those plans were canceled in 2020. Ford continued to hold a stake in Rivian, valued at over $10 billion as of November 2021. In December 2019, Rivian announced it raised US$1.3 billion in a round led by investment manager T Rowe Price with existing investors Ford and Amazon, alongside new investors London/New York firm Pario Ventures and BlackRock-managed funds.

Announced on January 19, 2021, Rivian raised $2.65 billion led by existing investor T. Rowe Price alongside Soros Fund Management, Fidelity Management & Research, Coatue Management, BlackRock-managed funds, Abdul Latif Jameel, and Amazon, now through its Climate Pledge Fund, plus new investors D1 Capital Partners. Abdul Latif J holds almost 114 million shares in Rivian acquired through $303 million of loans made to the company. Bloomberg estimated the company's value at nearly $28 billion. Announced on July 23, 2021, Rivian raised $2.5 billion in a round led by Amazon's Climate Pledge Fund, D1 Capital Partners, and Ford Motor Company, alongside existing investors T. Rowe Price, Coatue Management, Fidelity Management & Research. New investors Third Point Ventures and Dragoneer Investment Group joined the round.

==== Initial Public Offering (IPO) ====
In August 2021, Rivian filed for an initial public offering, seeking a valuation as high as $80 billion. By then, the firm had raised a total of approximately $11 billion.

In November 2021, Rivian completed its IPO with net proceeds to the firm of $13.5 billion. While initial price targets were in the $58 to $62 range, the actual offering price was $78.00 per share. On its first trading day on November 10, the stock closed at $100.73 per share with a market value of just under $100 billion. At that value, it was worth more than General Motors or Ford and was behind only Tesla in terms of the market cap of automakers. CEO R.J. Scaringe's ownership of 17.6 million shares was worth approximately $2 billion.

Amazon purchased $200 million of stock in the IPO, raising its total stake in Rivian to 22%. Previously, in October 2021, Amazon stated that it owned a 20% stake in the company.

The stock peaked at a closing price of $146.07 on November 13, 2021. From there, the stock price fell more or less continuously during the tech sell-off in early 2022 to reach $30.68 on April 26, 2022. The market value at the end of April 2022 had declined to roughly $29 billion, a loss of 79 percent. At the beginning of May 2022 the stock price fell further, closing at an all-time low of $22.78 on May 9, 2022, the decline from the peak in November 2021 being nearly 85 percent.

Rivian's stock price recovered significantly through the first half of 2023, reaching a period high of $28.06 on July 27, 2023. However, momentum has subsequently reversed with a $1.5bn convertible green note received poorly by the financial markets, causing the share price to decline to a daily low of $15.88 on October 26, 2023.

==== Largest shareholders ====
Around 28% of shares are held by insiders. By May 2026, Volkswagen Group's stake in Rivian, built through milestone-based investments under the joint venture, reached 15.9% (about 209.7 million shares), making it Rivian's largest shareholder and surpassing Amazon, which held about 12.28%. Other major holders included Oryx Global (8.6%) and Vanguard (5.1%); founder and CEO RJ Scaringe held roughly 1.1%. This marked a shift from December 2023, when the 10 largest institutional shareholders of Rivian were:

Shareholder name	Percentage
Amazon	16.33%
T. Rowe Price International	10.01%
The Vanguard Group	7.05%
BlackRock	4.96%
Fidelity Investments	3.70%
D. E. Shaw & Co.	1.74%
State Street Corporation	1.49%
UBS	1.23%
Two Sigma	1.23%
Morgan Stanley	1.21%
Others	51.05%

== Collaborations ==
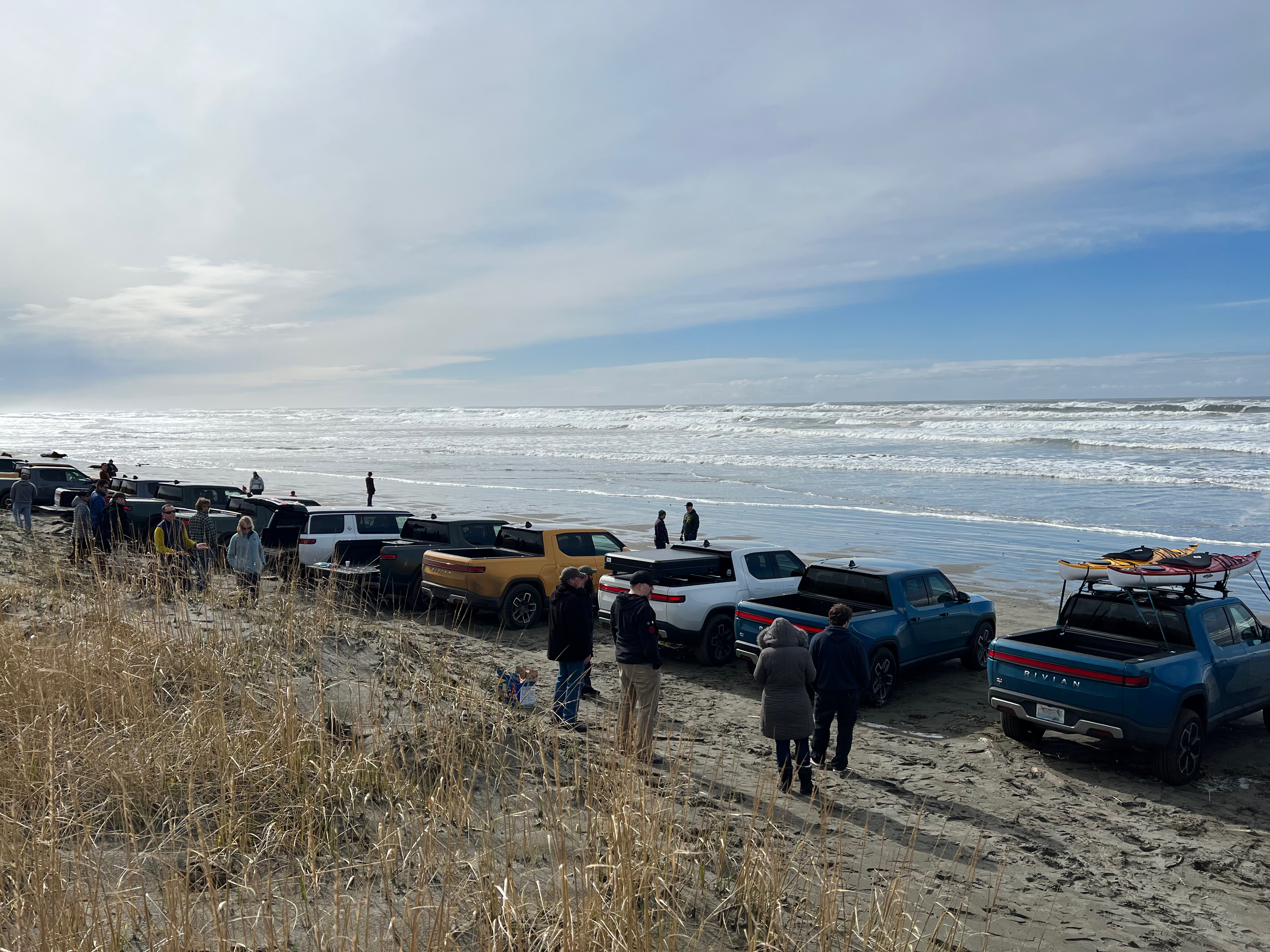
Emerald City Rivian Club meetup at the Westport, WA beach

On December 20, 2018, professional rock climber Alex Honnold announced his partnership with Rivian as a brand partner and collaborator. During a live stream on June 15, 2019, Rivian announced plans to collaborate with the Honnold Foundation and nonprofit Casa Pueblo on a solar project aiming to establish a microgrid in Adjuntas, Puerto Rico, a city that was severely affected by Hurricane Maria in 2017. Rivian planned to repurpose used battery packs from its development vehicles into stationary energy storage units. The microgrid is intended to grant residents access to electricity for core business and will be used daily to mitigate the high cost of energy in Puerto Rico, which is twice the U.S. national average. The project was expected to launch in 2020.

In 2019, Rivian partnered with actors Ewan McGregor and Charley Boorman to provide prototypes for use as logistics vehicles and camera cars for the British TV series Long Way Up. They also set up 240 level 2 charging stations at 140 locations, along the route from Tierra del Fuego to Los Angeles.

Rivian partners with Yakima for their roof racks (bike, kayak, surfboard etc.) and rooftop tents, and MAXTRAX for their recovery boards.

In 2024, Volkswagen announced they would form a joint venture with Rivian. The venture, formally launched in November 2024, was structured to reach up to $5.8 billion in total investment by 2027; Volkswagen's stake grew in stages as technical milestones were met, and by May 2026 Volkswagen had become Rivian's largest shareholder, ahead of Amazon. Volkswagen's ID.EVERY1-derived small EV, expected in 2027, is anticipated to be the first Volkswagen model to use the joint venture's electrical architecture and software.

== Commercial lawsuits ==
In July 2020, Tesla sued Rivian for allegedly stealing proprietary information, as well as for poaching employees.

In March 2021, the Illinois Automobile Dealers Association filed a lawsuit against Rivian and fellow EV manufacturer Lucid Motors for their plans to sell electric vehicles directly to consumers.

== Employee issues ==
In November 2021, Rivian's former sales and marketing vice president Laura Schwab filed a suit against the company, claiming she was fired a month after raising concerns of discrimination and Rivian being a "boys' club" to the company's HR department. Schwab also claimed that she warned company executives of their vehicles being underpriced and the manufacturing process not conforming to security standards. According to the lawsuit, issues she raised were ignored until male colleagues also raised them subsequently.

Other employee lawsuits claimed "sexual harassment, discrimination, and assault ... experienced were severe, extremely offensive, humiliating, and created a hostile, intimidating, and unproductive work environment ... that interfered with her ability to perform her job" and that Rivian "was aware of said harassment".

At least four employees have sued Rivian alleging racial discrimination.

According to Bloomberg in 2024, Rivian's only factory has "racked up more US safety violations initially deemed 'serious' than any other automaker since the start of last year."

== See also ==
- List of production battery electric vehicles
- Rivian and Volkswagen Group Technologies
