= Dongfeng Fengguang 330S =

Chinese compact MPV

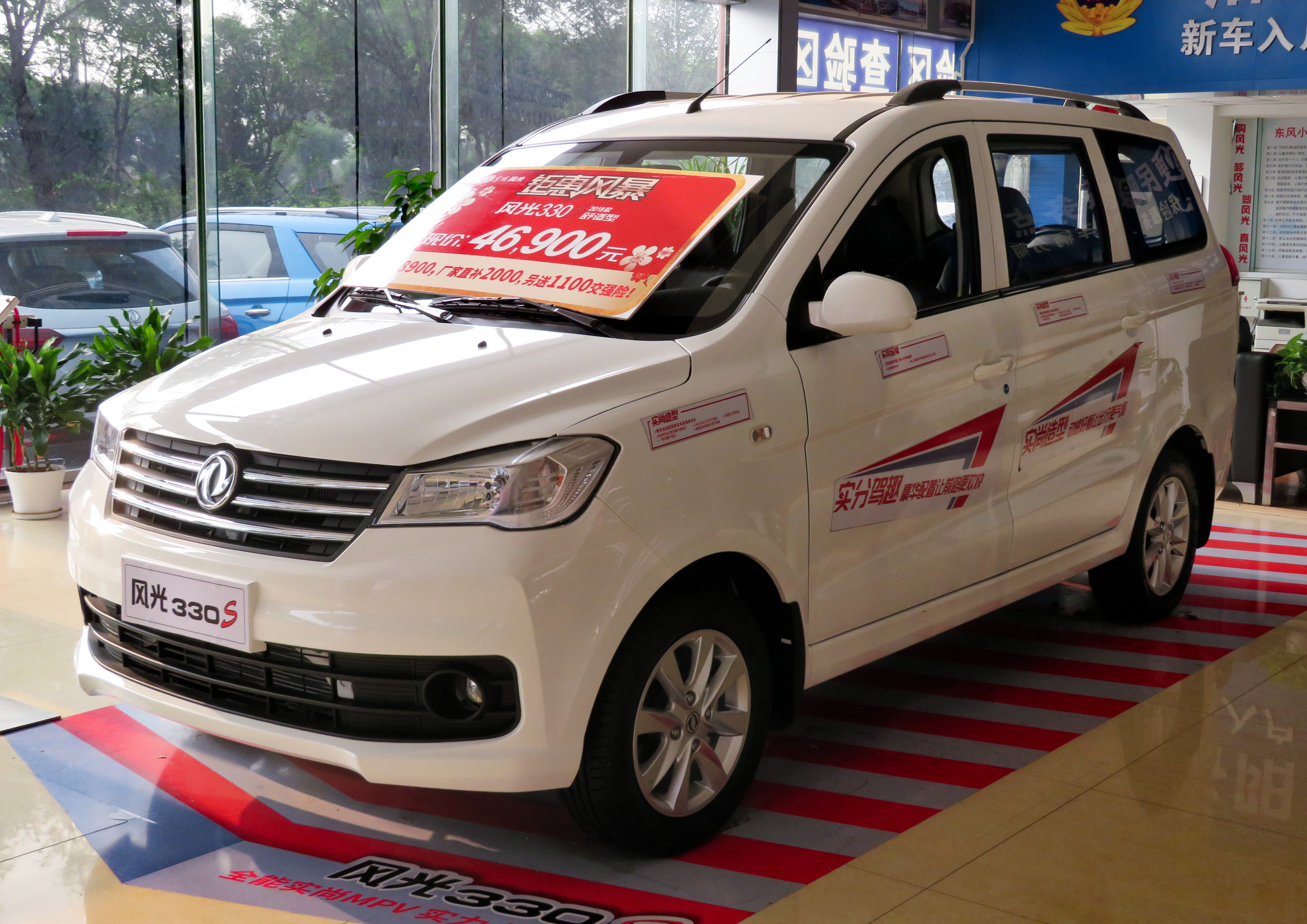

Overview
- Manufacturer: DFSK Motor
- Production: 2017–present
- Model years: 2017–present
- Assembly: China

Body and chassis
- Class: Compact MPV
- Body style: 5-door wagon
- Layout: Front engine, rear wheel drive
- Related: Dongfeng Fengguang 330; Dongfeng Fengguang 370

Powertrain
- Engine: Petrol: 1.5 L I4
- Transmission: 5-speed manual

Dimensions
- Wheelbase: 2,725 mm (107.3 in)
- Length: 4,400 mm (173.2 in)
- Width: 1,720 mm (67.7 in)
- Height: 1,770 mm (69.7 in)

Chronology
- Successor: Fengon 380

The Dongfeng Fengguang 330S is a compact MPV produced by Chinese auto maker Dongfeng-Sokon (DFSK), a subsidiary of Dongfeng Motor Co., Ltd.

== Overview ==
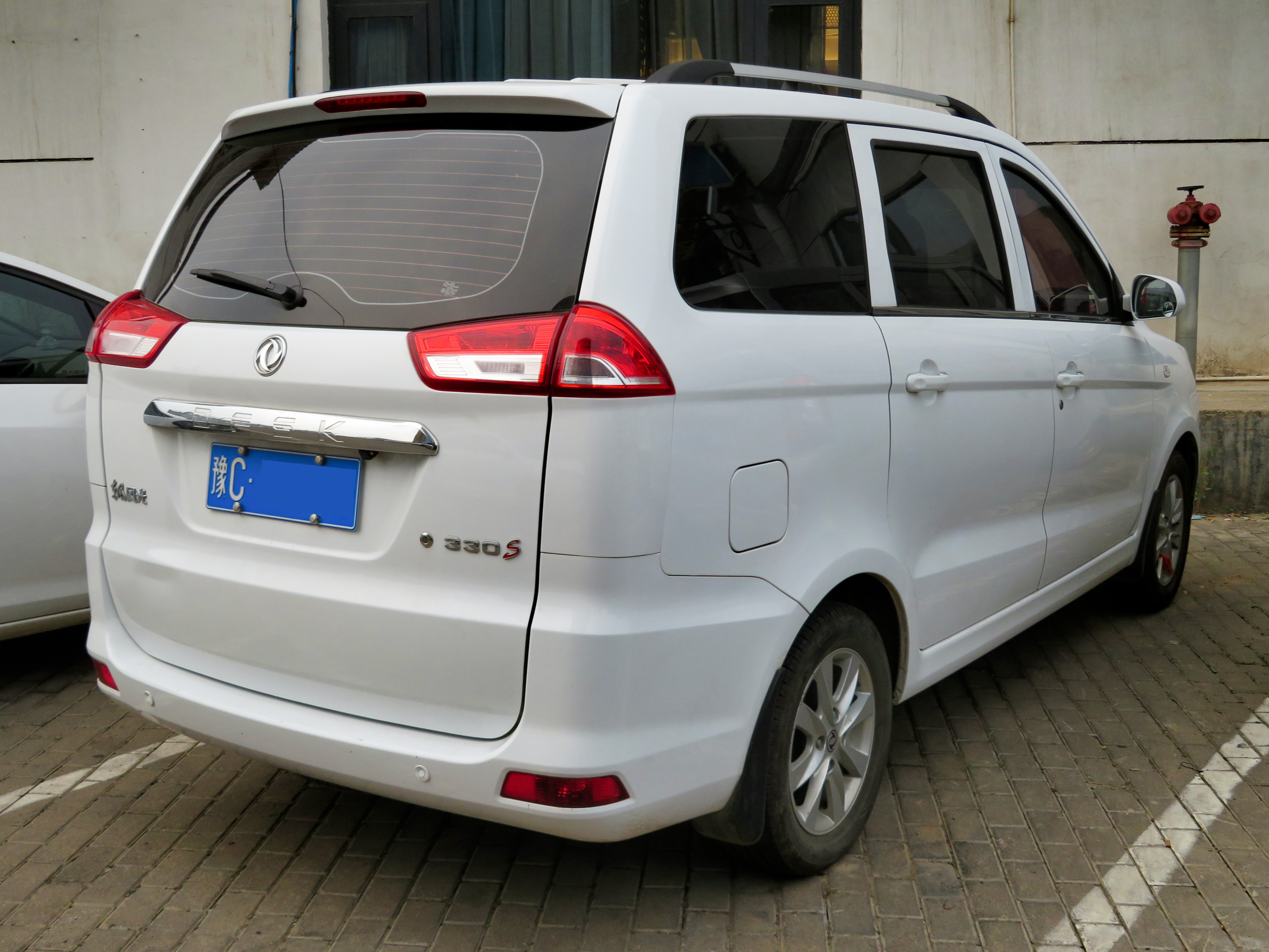
Fengguang 330S (rear)

The Fengguang 330S debuted at the 2017 Wuhan Commercial Auto Show and was launched in the Chinese car market in November 2017. The Dongfeng Fengguang 330S is based on the Dongfeng Fengguang 330 MPV. Essentially a restyled version of the 330, the 330S is positioned higher in the market and seats seven in a 2-3-2 configuration, with prices starting from 45,900 yuan to 47,900 yuan.
