= Seres Auto (Hubei) =

Chinese vehicle manufacturer

Seres Auto (Hubei) Co., Ltd.
- Native name: 赛力斯汽车（湖北）有限公司
- Formerly: Dongfeng Sokon Automobile (DFSK)
- Industry: Automotive
- Founded: 27 June 2003; 23 years ago
- Founders: Seres Group
- Area served: China and international markets
- Products: Automobiles, commercial vehicles, auto parts
- Brands: DFSK; Fengon (DFSK Glory)
- Parent: Seres Group

Chinese name
- Simplified Chinese: 赛力斯（湖北）
- Traditional Chinese: 賽力斯（湖北）
Transcriptions
- Website: https://www.dfdongfeng.com.cn/

Logo of DFSK brand

Seres Auto (Hubei) Co., Ltd. (Chinese: 赛力斯汽车（湖北）有限公司), formerly named Dongfeng Sokon Automobile (Chinese: 东风小康; pinyin: Dōngfēng Xiǎokāng) and known internationally as DFSK Motor, is a Chinese automotive company formed as a joint venture between Seres Group (formerly Sokon Group) and Dongfeng. It was established on June 27, 2003. Nowadays it is fully owned by Seres.

Seres Hubei produces microvans, commercial flatbed trucks and passenger vehicles under the DFSK/Dongfeng Sokon brand and budget passenger vehicles under the Fengon (DFSK Glory) brand. Manufacturing takes place in four different facilities, two of which are located in Hubei Shiyan and two in Chongqing.

== History ==
At the beginning of 2000, Chongqing Yu'an Innovation Technology (Group), a manufacturer of motorcycles and automotive components, and Dongfeng Motor evaluated the possibility of manufacturing microvans intended for small Chinese businesses. Dongfeng had experience producing cars for PSA, but had not yet produced vehicles in the light commercial segment, and approved the project.

In 2003 the joint venture Dongfeng Yu'an Automobile, headquartered in Chongqing, was formed and work began on the construction of a new factory. Yu'an Group provided the design for the microvans, and acquired licensing for the production of chassis, engines, and components for microvans from Suzuki. Dongfeng was responsible for the engineering and testing of the vehicles. In 2005, they debuted their first small van, called the C-Series. It was offered in multiple configurations (paneled, passenger minibus and pick-up) with Suzuki engines and rear-wheel drive. At its debut, the Yu'an Group changed its name to Chongquin Sokon Industry Group (abbreviated to Sokon in English or Sokon in Chinese) and the joint venture consequently became Dongfeng Sokon Automobile (abbreviated to DFSK).

In the Chinese market the vehicles are sold as Dongfeng Sokon while in the export markets the name DFSK is used. In both cases, the brand on the grille is Dongfeng's “Dual Wings”.

Subsequently, DFSK presents many other models of minivan and starts exporting them also in Europe; in the United Kingdom they are distributed by subsidiary Sokon Automobile and in Italy by Giotti Victoria.

In September 2003, Chongqing Ruichi Automobiles (瑞驰新能源公司), a fully funded subsidiary of Chongqing Sokon Group was established. As an enterprise for the manufacturing, sales and services for the pure electric commercial vehicles, Ruichi is one of the earliest enterprises in China with qualifications for the production of pure electric commercial vehicles. Chongqing Ruichi Automobiles is now a fully funded subsidiary of Seres, with products being rebadged electrified versions of DFSK's microvans and trucks.

In 2013, DFSK decided to enter the lucrative sport utility vehicle (SUV) market by starting the design of a seven-seater mid-size vehicle using Dongfeng technologies; this vehicle was designed so that it could have an aggressive price classifying itself as a low-cost family car and had to be sold both in China and abroad. The project debuted in 2016 called Dongfeng Fengguang 580, a five and seven-seater front-wheel or four-wheel drive SUV with Mitsubishi engines. The brand name Fengguang (translated into Fengon in English) is used to distinguish them from the production of minivans called Sokon. On foreign markets, this vehicle will be renamed DFSK Glory (easier to pronounce) using the Dongfeng Dual Wings emblem on the grille, interior and rear.

In the same years, the production of the minivan range was started in Indonesia and Thailand and exports also to South America and Eastern Europe.

DFSK began to assemble and market products in Indonesia in 2015. Plans at the time of launch included an expected production of 50,000 units/year.

In 2017, joint venture of DFSK and Regal Automobile began assembly in Pakistan. Plant in Lahore producing SUV Glory 580 variants, C-37 Van, Humsafar MPV, K01 Pickup truck etc.

Total sales in 2017 reached 402,000 vehicles and in November 2018 Chongqing Sokon Group attempted to acquire the remaining 50% of the DFSK joint venture from Dongfeng for 621 million euros, becoming 100% owner. The deal was abandoned in July 2019

In September 2019, Sokon acquired the remaining 50% of the DFSK joint venture from Dongfeng. Seres continued to produce vehicles using the Dongfeng logo and under the DFSK brand while phasing out the Dongfeng logo on the Fengguang brand after it was renamed to Fengon.

In April 2020, Chongqing Sokon Industrial Group purchased 50% of DFSK's equity from Dongfeng Motor Group, making DFSK a wholly owned subsidiary of Sokon Group. As of 2021, DFSK has a total of 4 production bases in China, two of which are located in Shiyan, Hubei and two in Chongqing.

In October 2023, Dongfeng Sokon Automobile was renamed to Seres Auto (Hubei).

== Products ==
=== Fengon ===
Fengon (or DFSK Glory for foreign markets) formerly known as Dongfeng Fengguang (Chinese: 东风风光; lit. 'East wind Scenery'), is the sub-brand of Seres that produces passenger vehicles. Established in 2008, Fengon brand targets at affordable compact MPVs and SUVs. It used to be a joint-venture brand with Dongfeng Group but was fully acquired by Seres Group in 2022. The Fengon brand began to replace the former Dongfeng logo and replaced it with its own Fengon logo in models after the acquisition.

==== Current model ====
Car

- Fengon Mini EV (2022–present), city car

SUV

- Fengon ix5 (2019–present), compact SUV
- Fengon 580 (2016–present), mid-size SUV
- Fengon 500 (2019–present), subcompact SUV
- Fengon S560 (2017–present), compact SUV

MPV/Minivan

- Fengon 380/E380 (2022–present), compact MPV
- Fengon 330S (2019–present), compact MPV
- Fengon 330 (2014–present), compact MPV
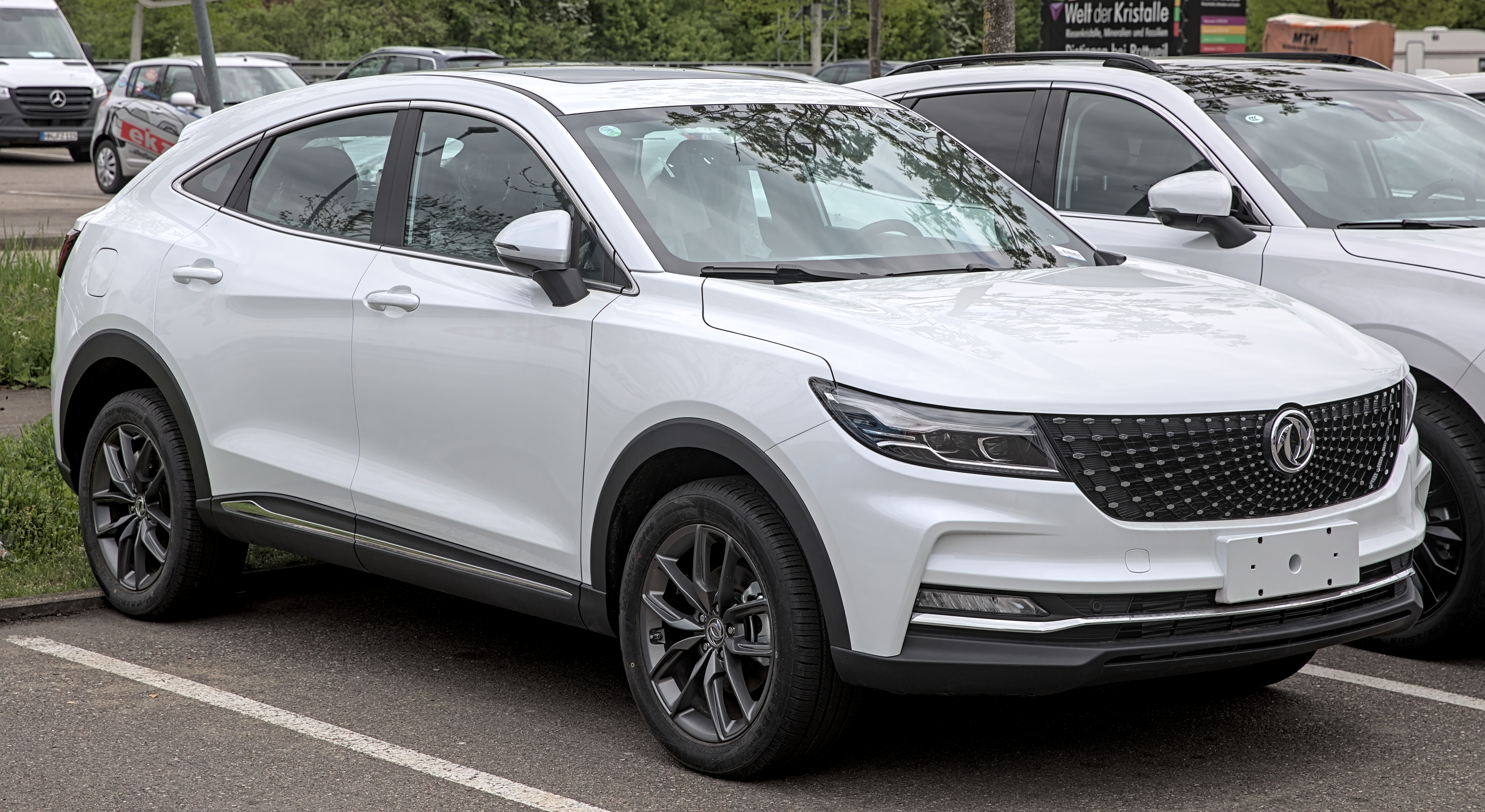
Fengon ix5

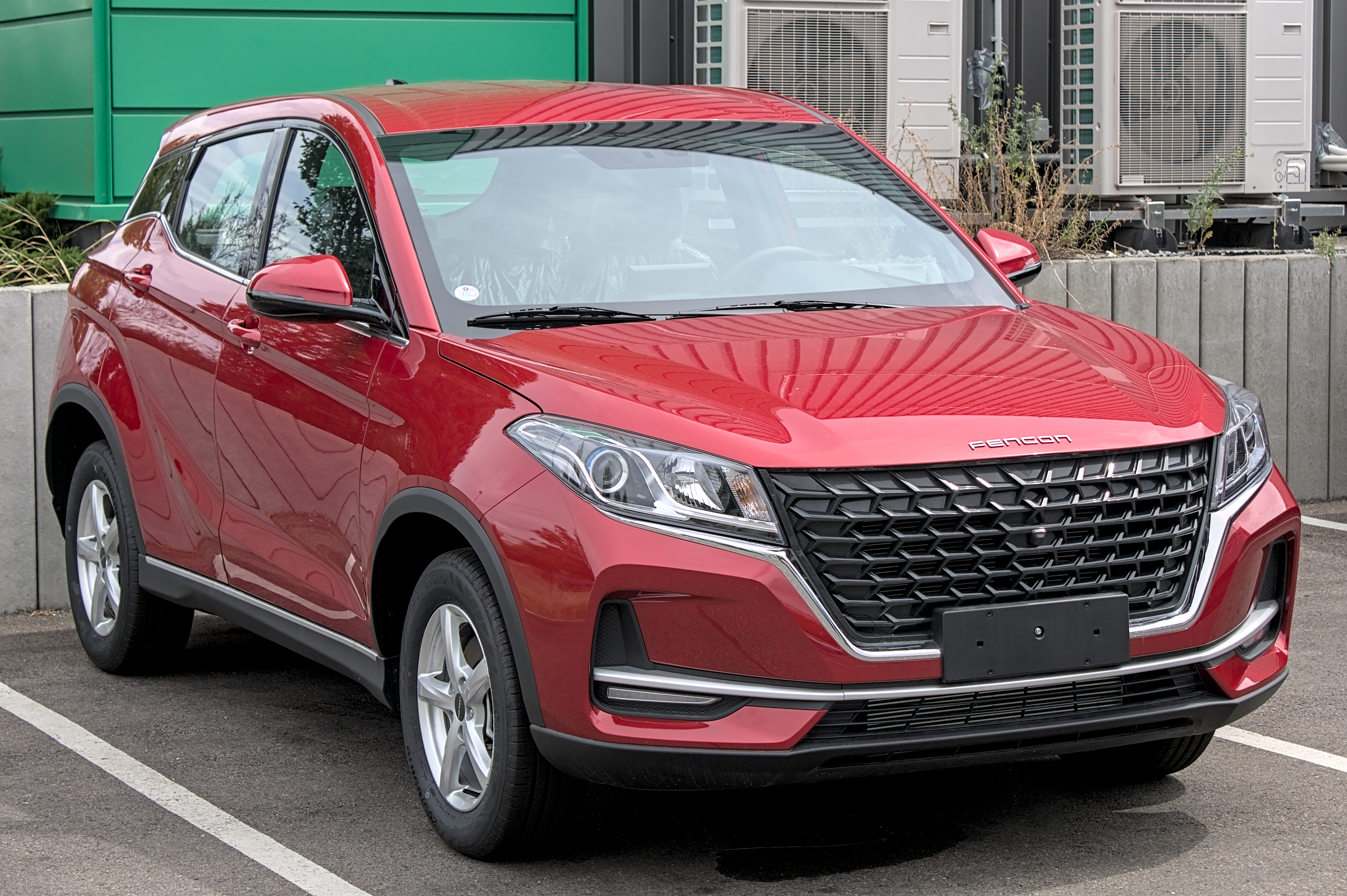
Fengon 500

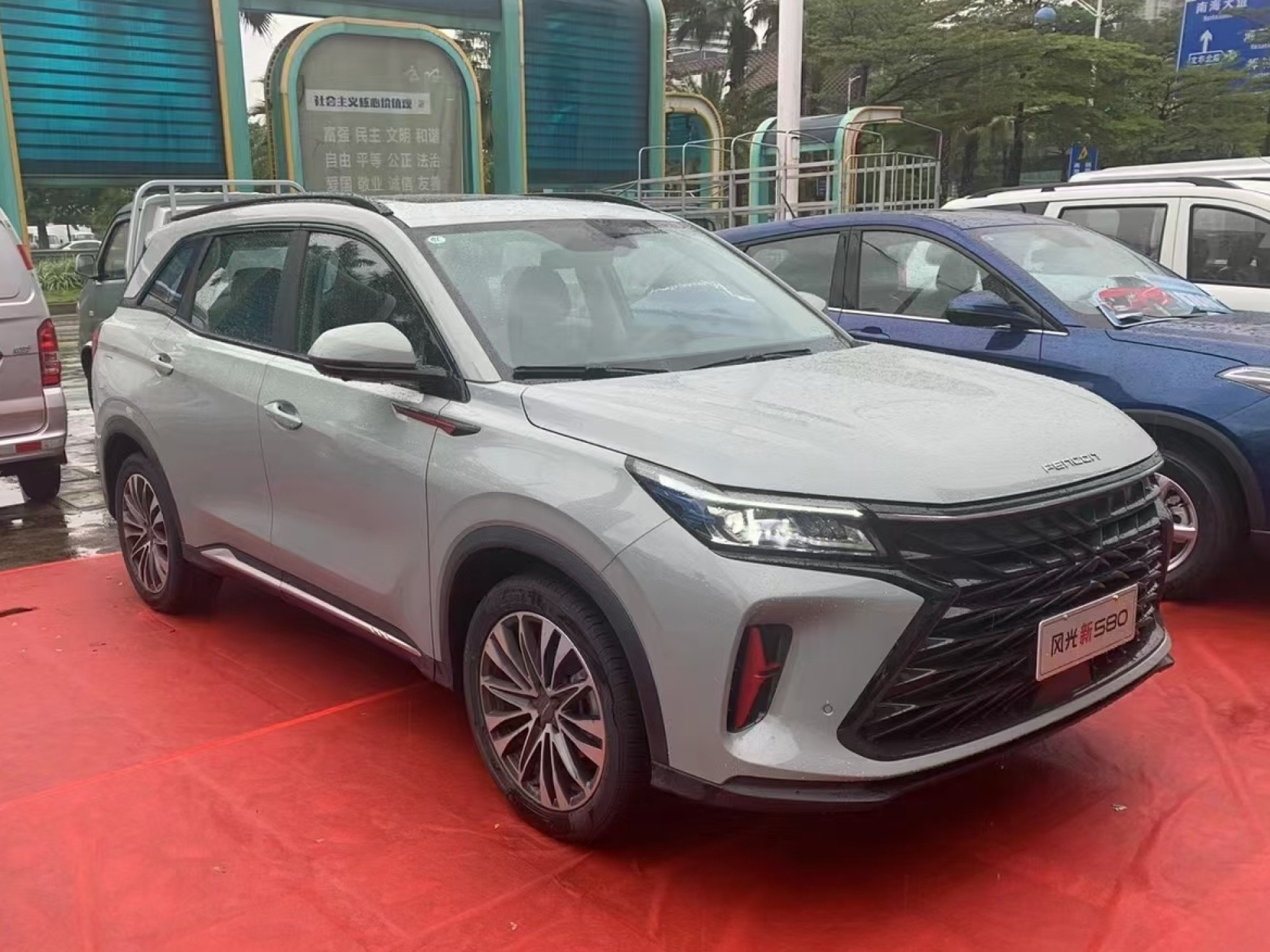
Fengon 580

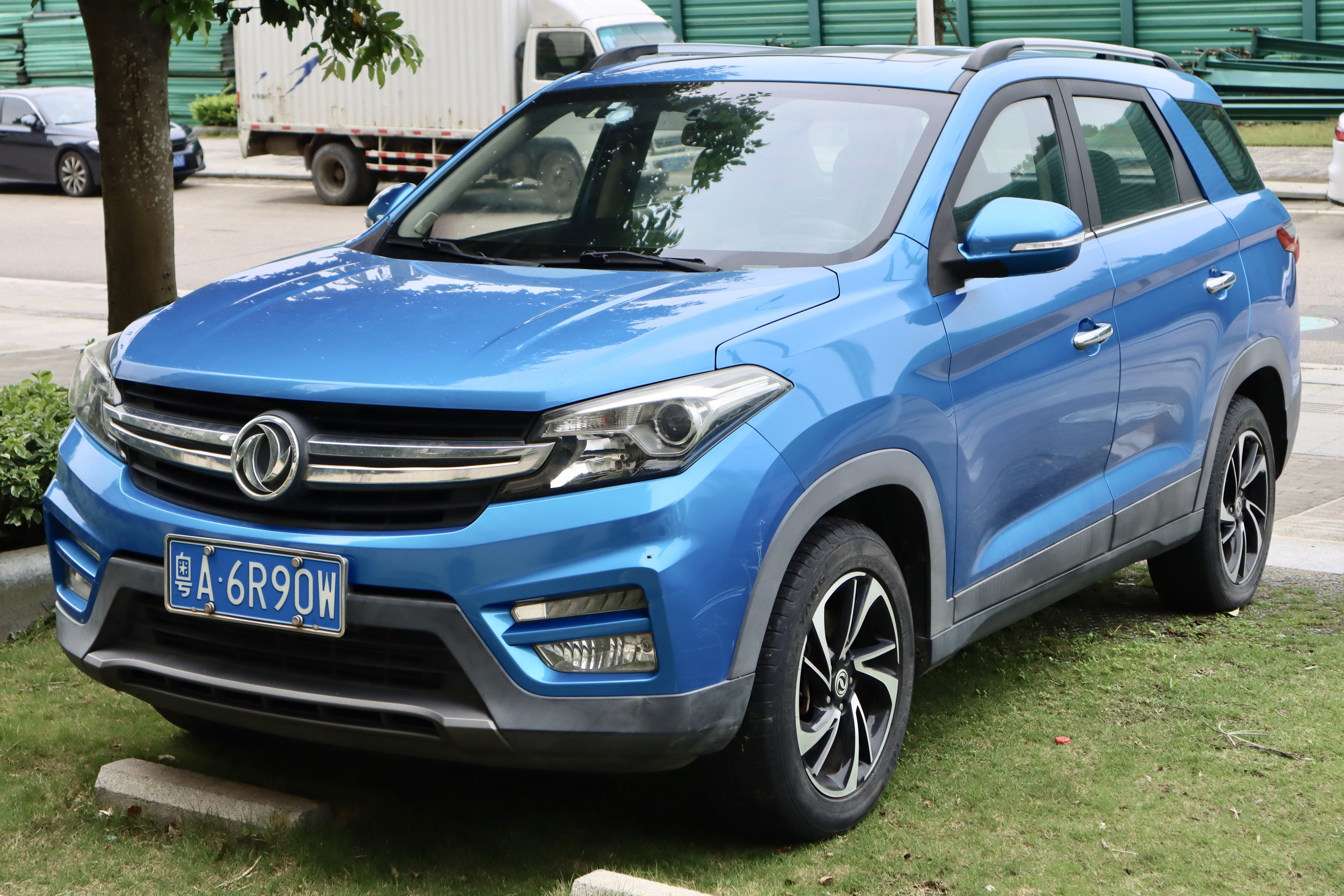
Fengon S560

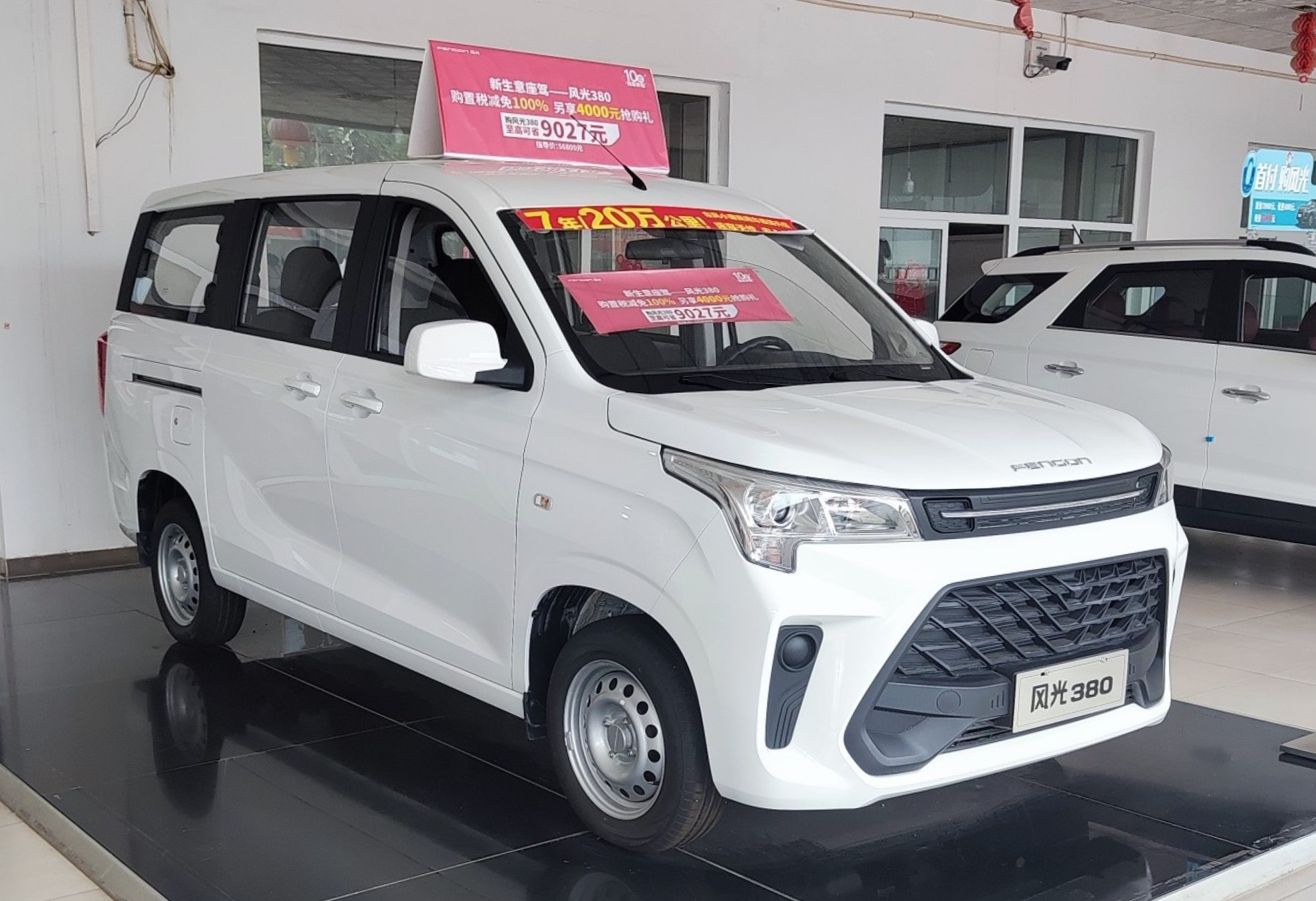
Fengon 380

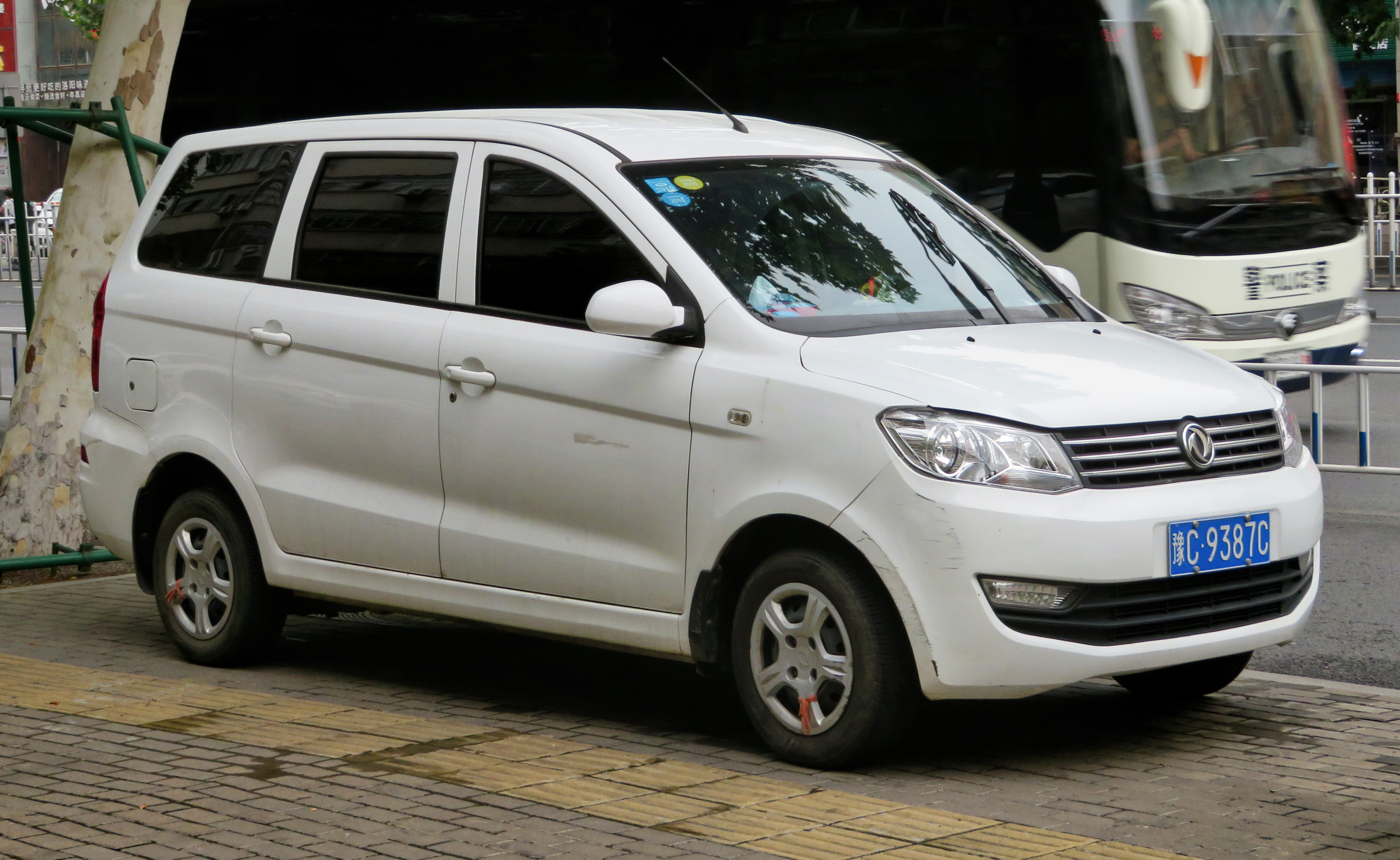
Fengon 330

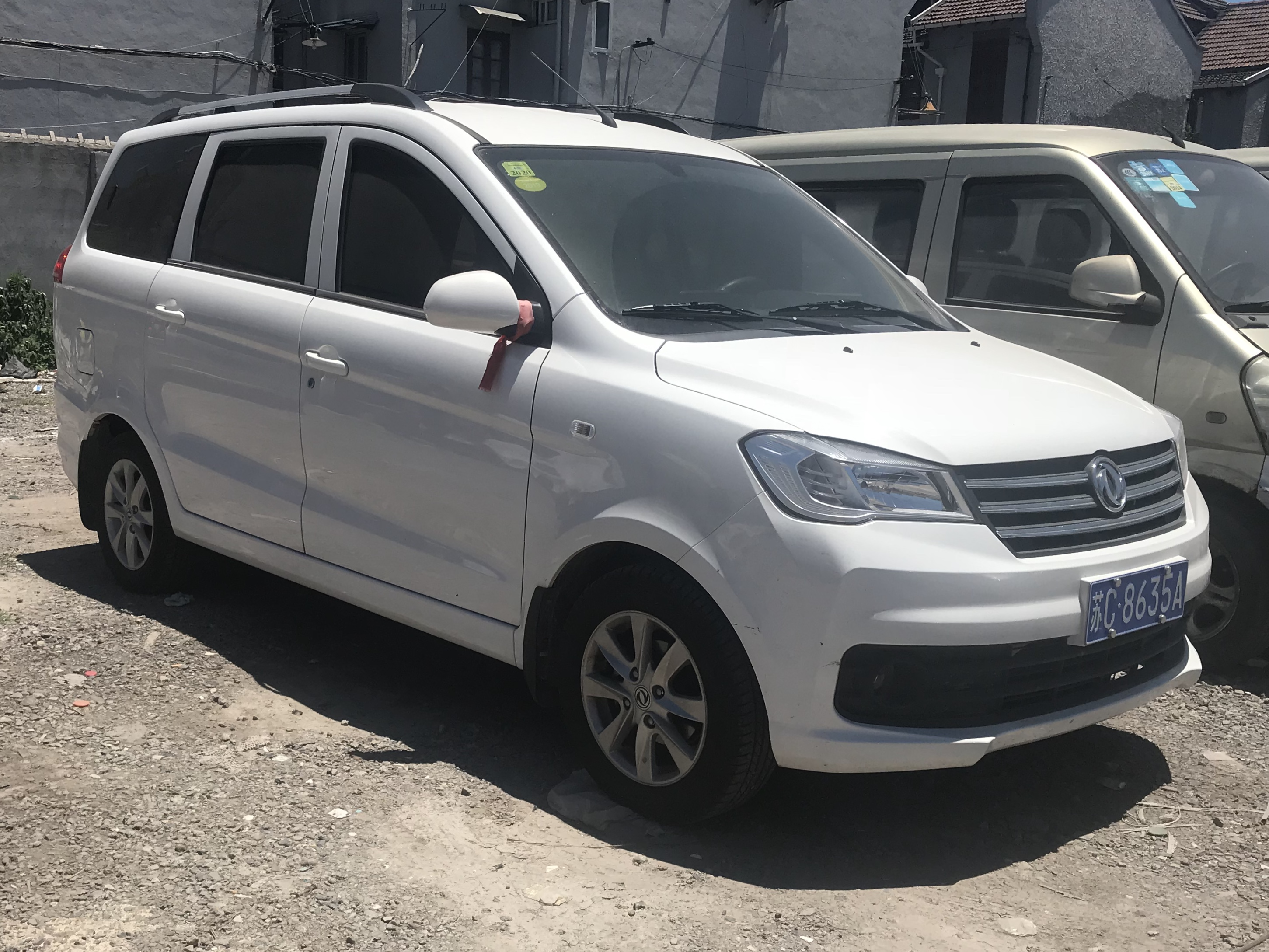
Fengon 330S

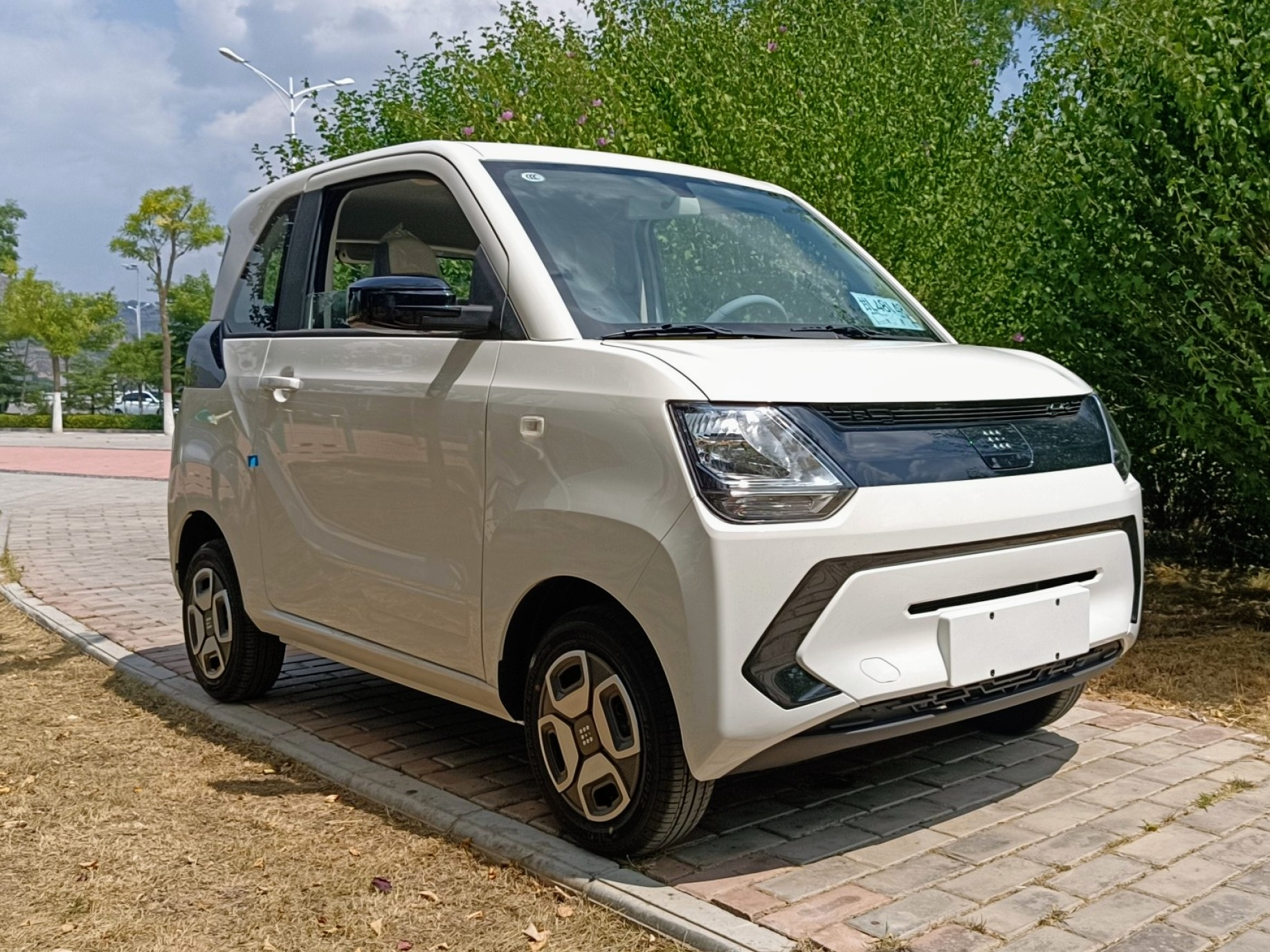
Fengon Mini EV

==== Discontinued model ====
SUV

- Fengon E1 (2020–2023), city car, rebadged Dongfeng Nano EX1
- Fengon E3 (2019–2022), subcompact SUV, EREV variant of Fengon 500
- Fengon ix7 (2020–2023), mid-size SUV

MPV/Minivan

- Fengon 370 (2016–2020), compact MPV
- Fengon 360 (2015–2017), compact MPV
- Fengon 350 (2016–2020), compact MPV
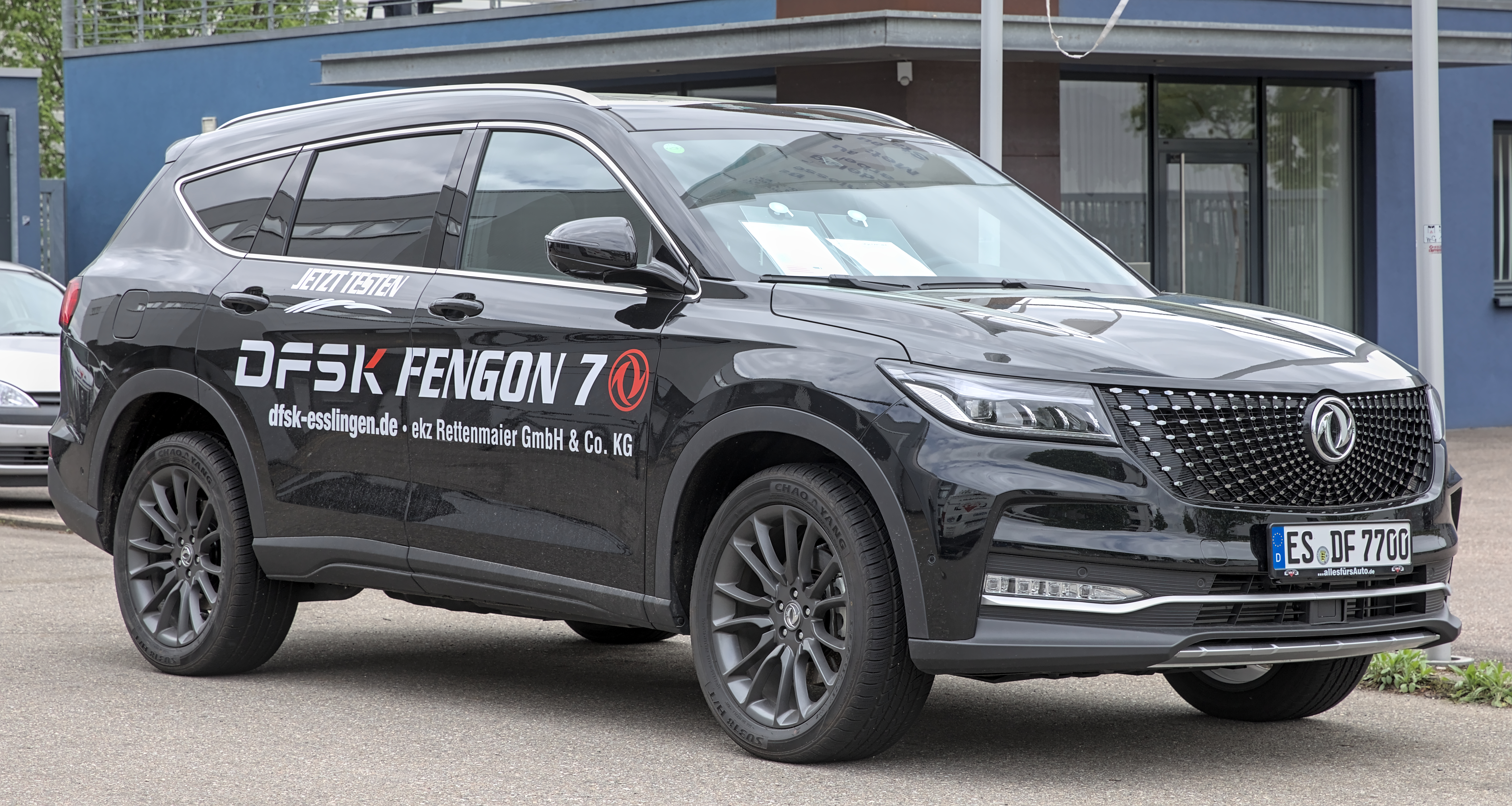
Fengon ix7

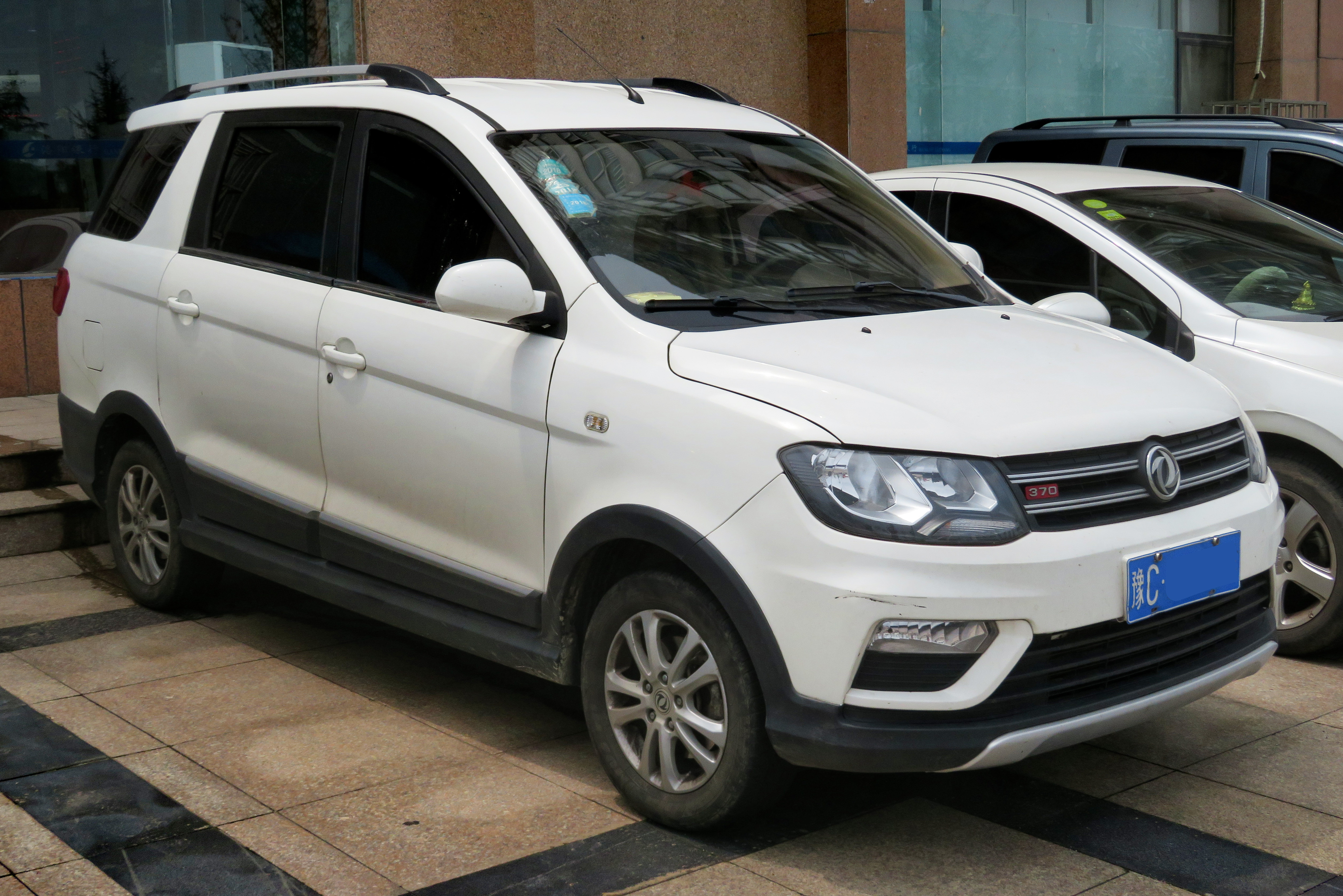
Fengon 370

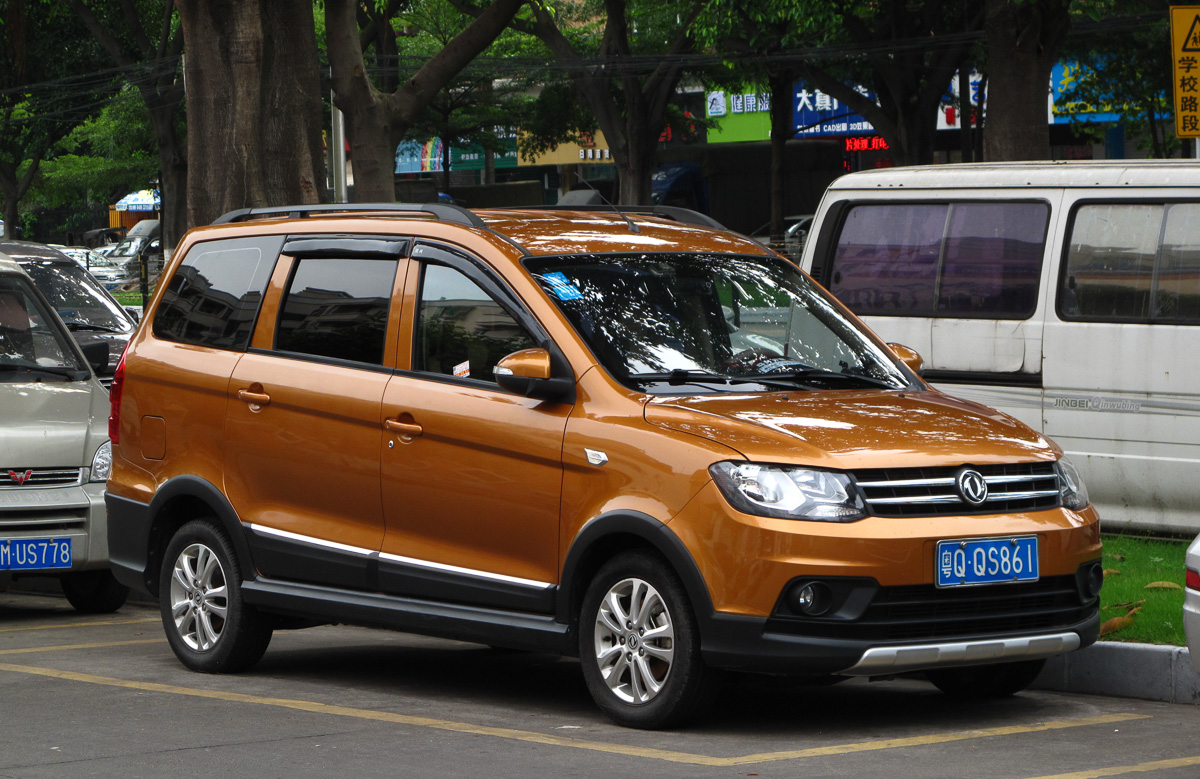
Fengon 360

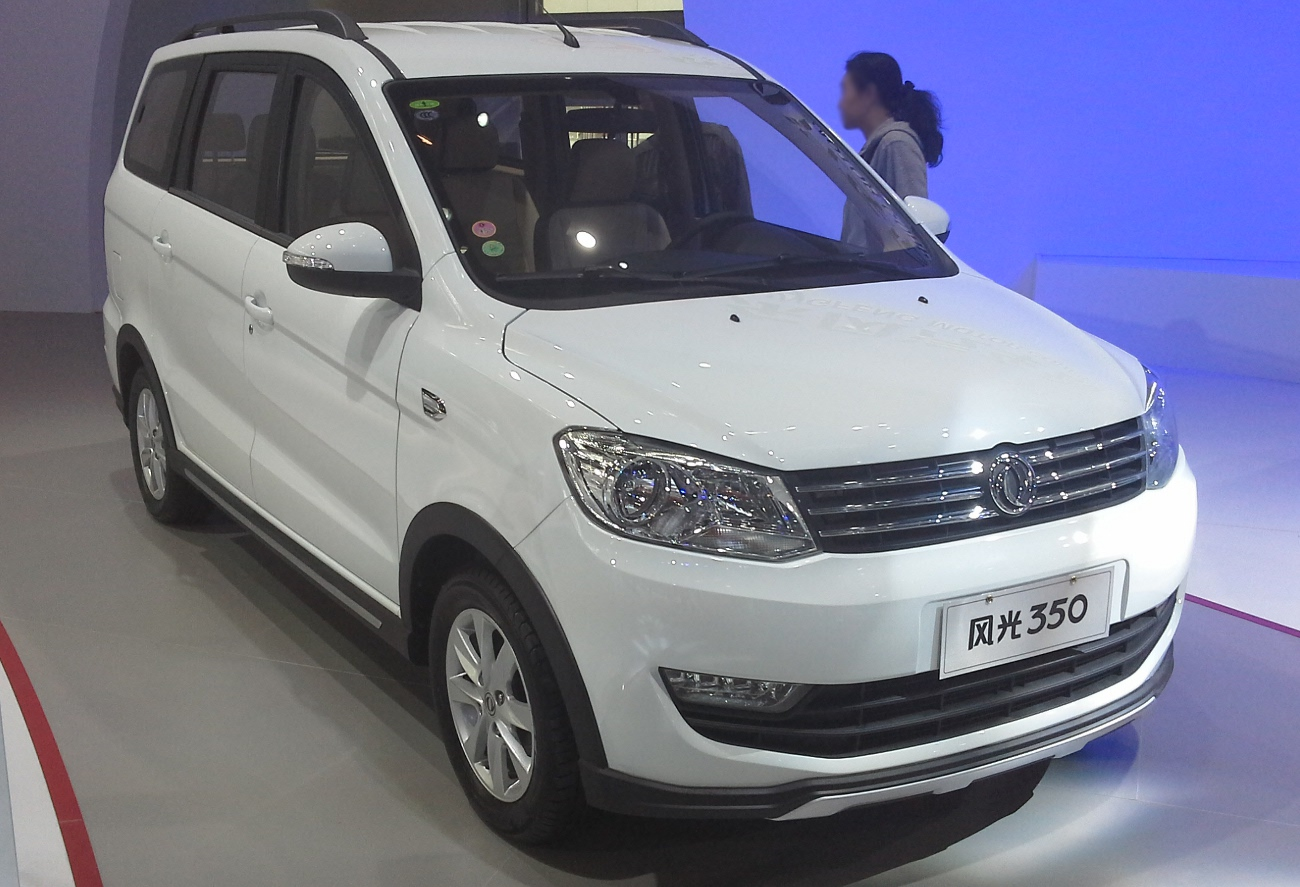
Fengon 350

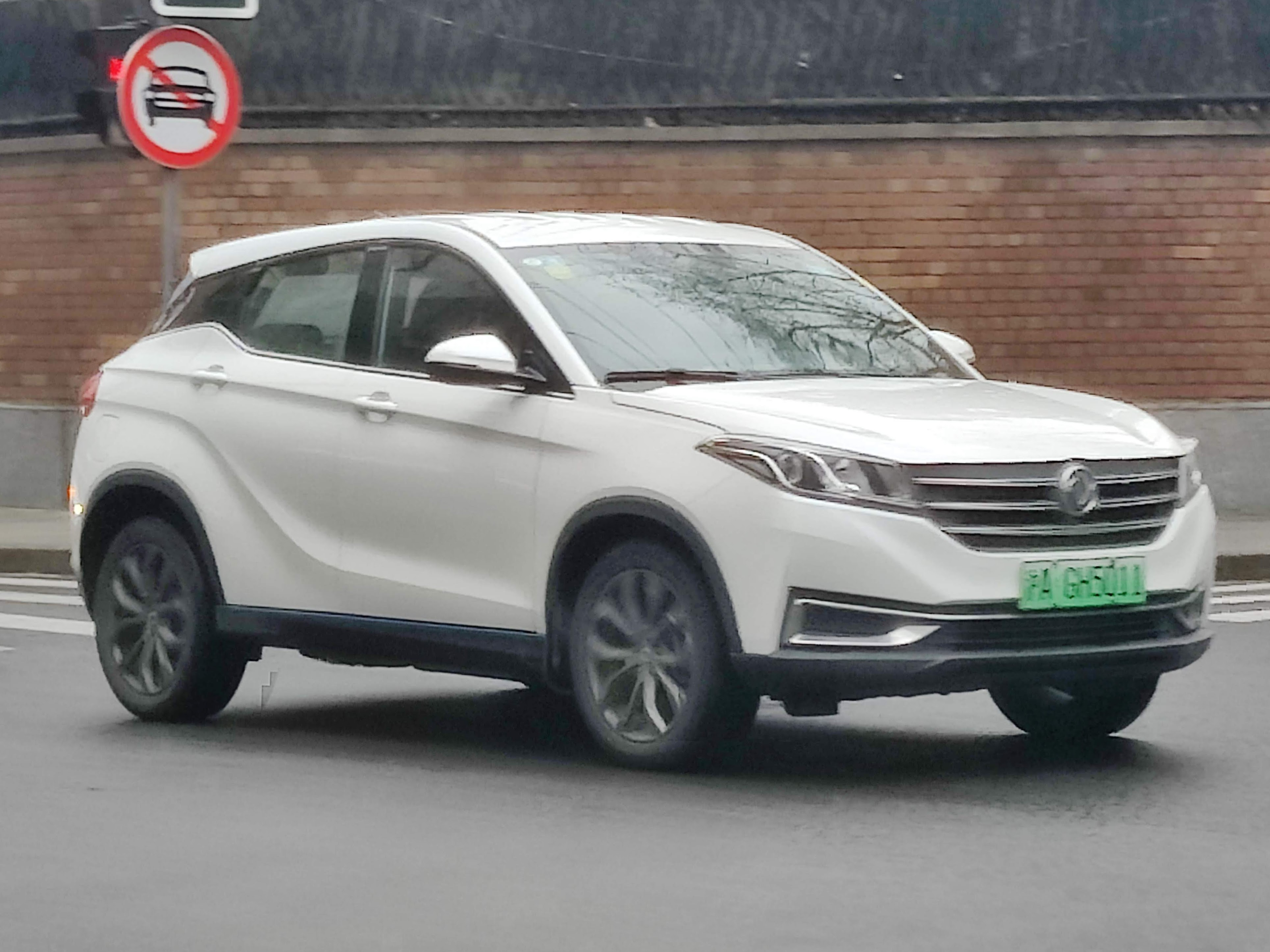
Fengon E3

=== DFSK ===
The DFSK (Dongfeng Sokon, Chinese: 东风小康) is a brand of Seres that produces light commercial vehicles. Currently available products include:

- C-Series
  - Sokon C37/C36
  - Sokon C31/C32
  - Sokon EC75
- K-Series
  - Sokon K05
  - Sokon K07
  - Sokon K09
  - Sokon K05S
  - Sokon K07S
  - Sokon K01/K02
- V-Series
  - Sokon V07S- microvan
  - Sokon V21- single cab pickup
  - Sokon V22- crew cab pickup
  - Sokon V25- microvan
  - Sokon V26- microvan
  - Sokon V27- microvan
  - Sokon V29- microvan, pickup
- E-Series
  - DFSK E5 - export version of Fengon 580
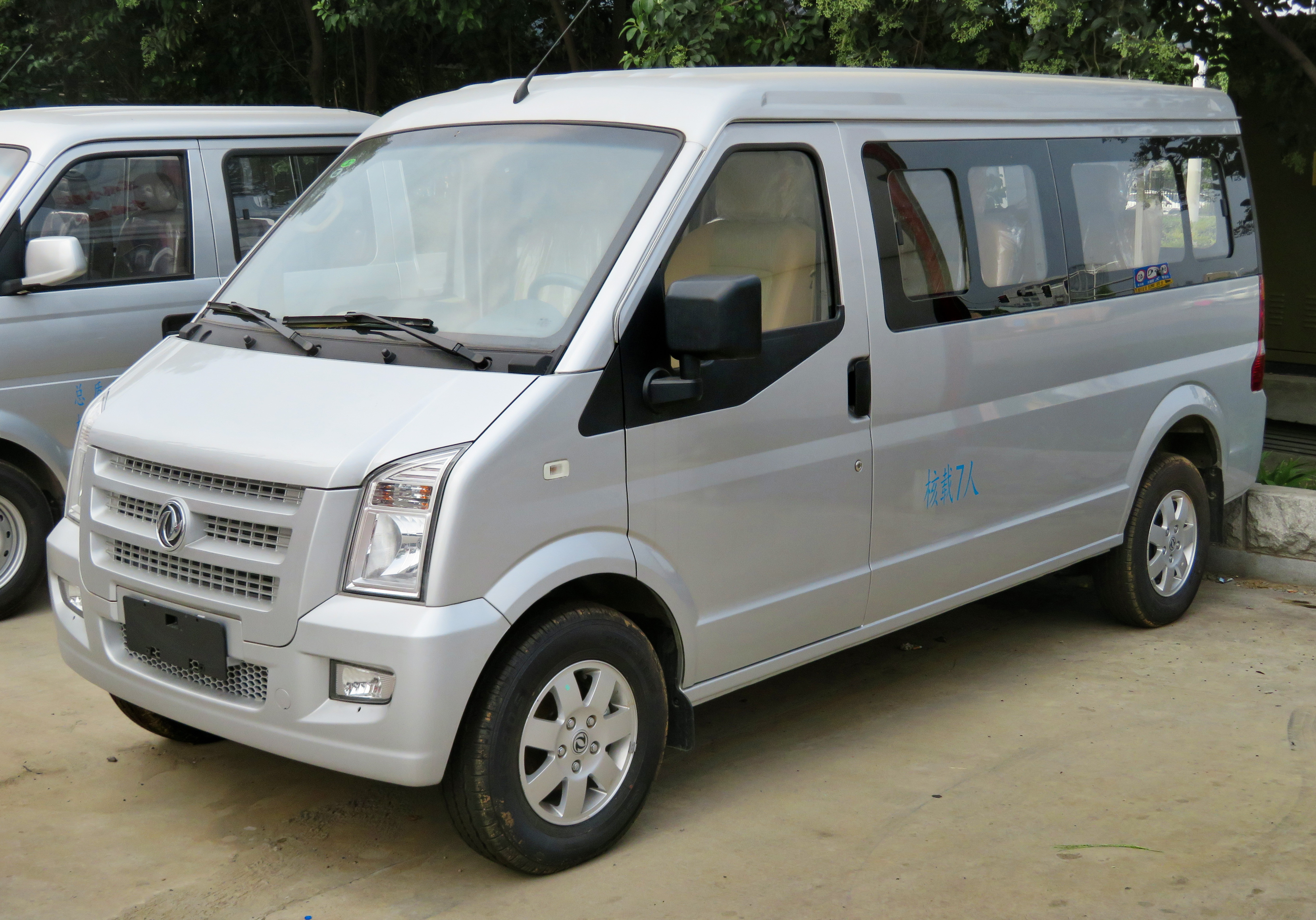
Sokon C37

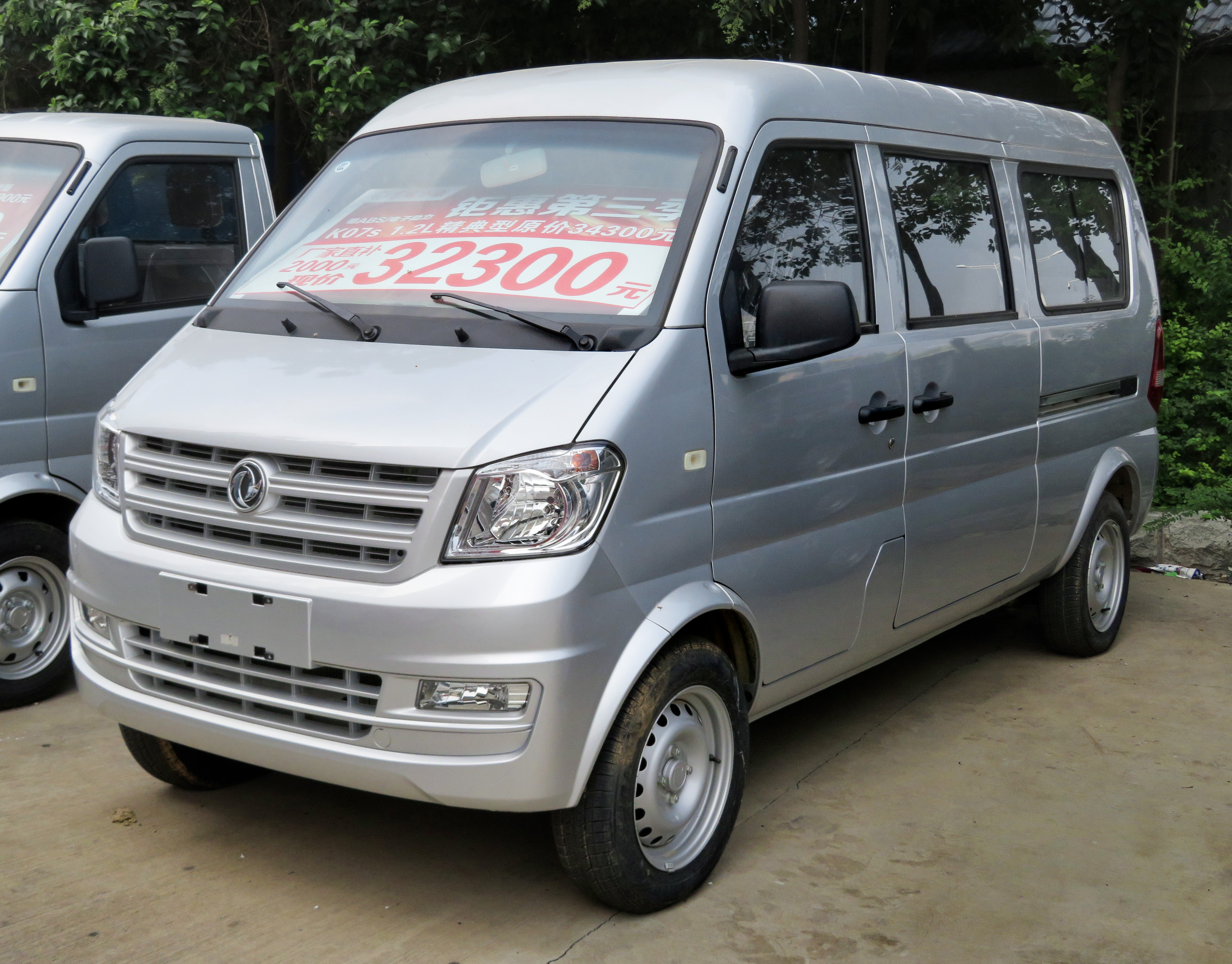
Sokon K07S

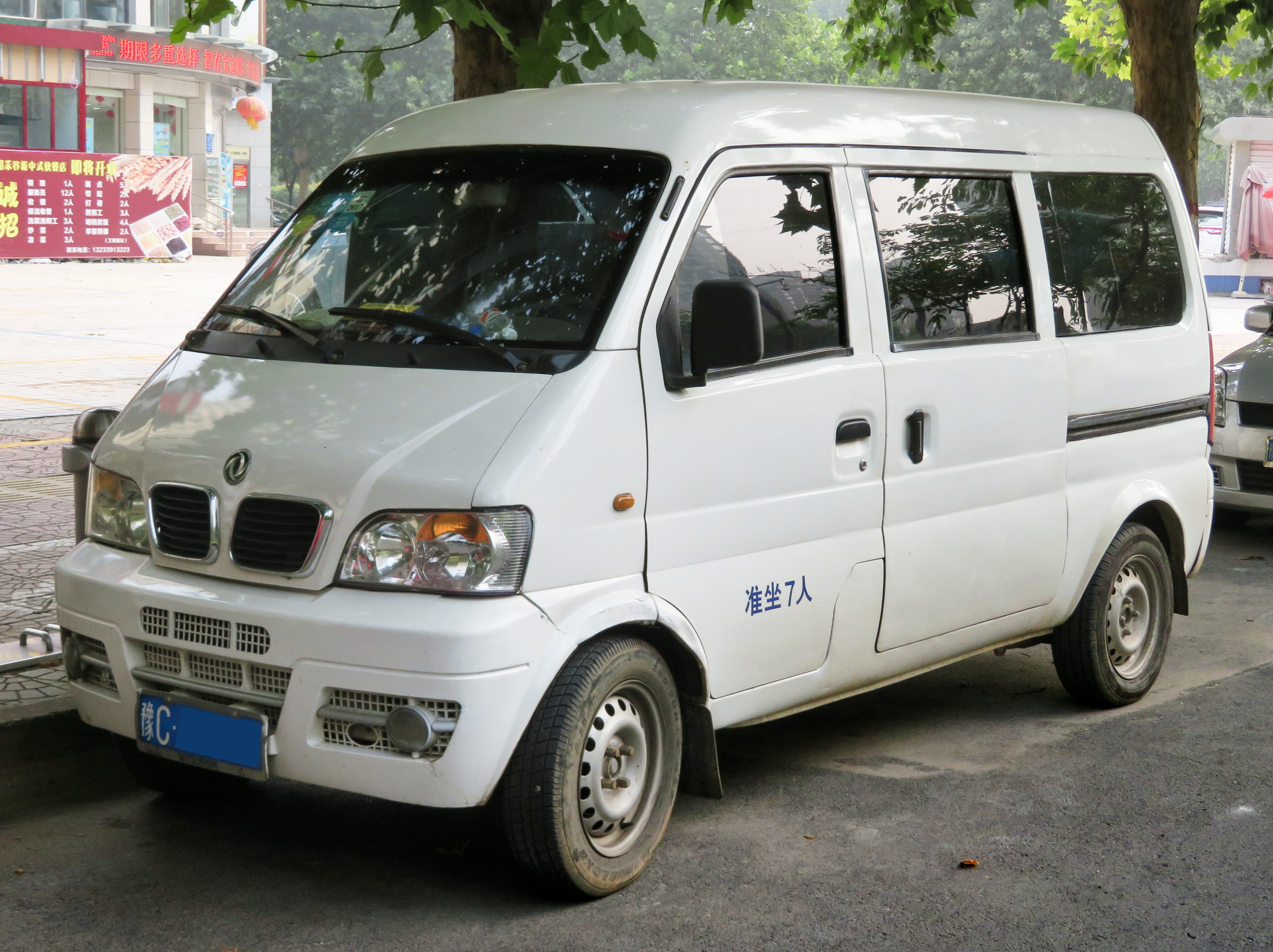
Sokon K07/K17

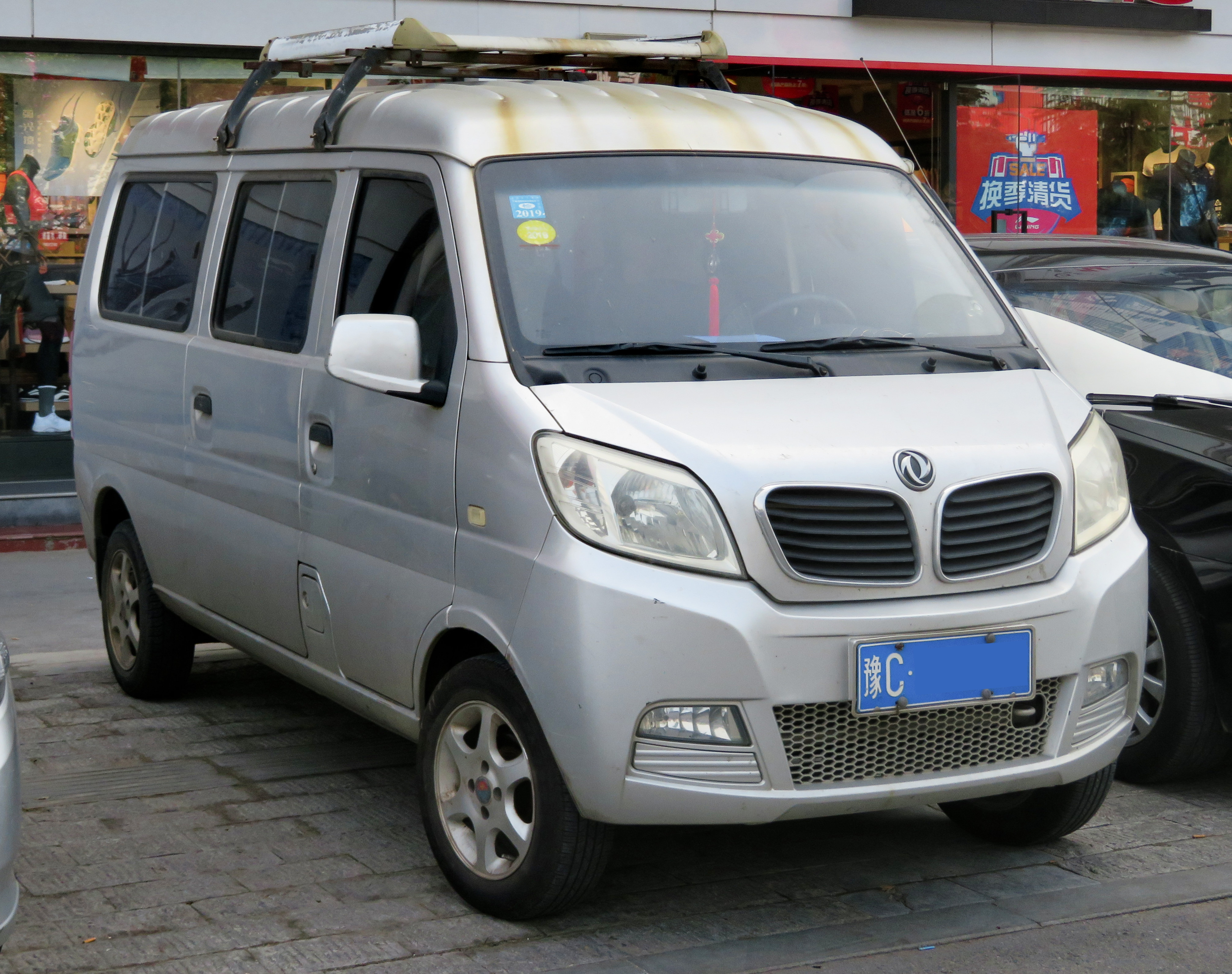
Sokon New K07

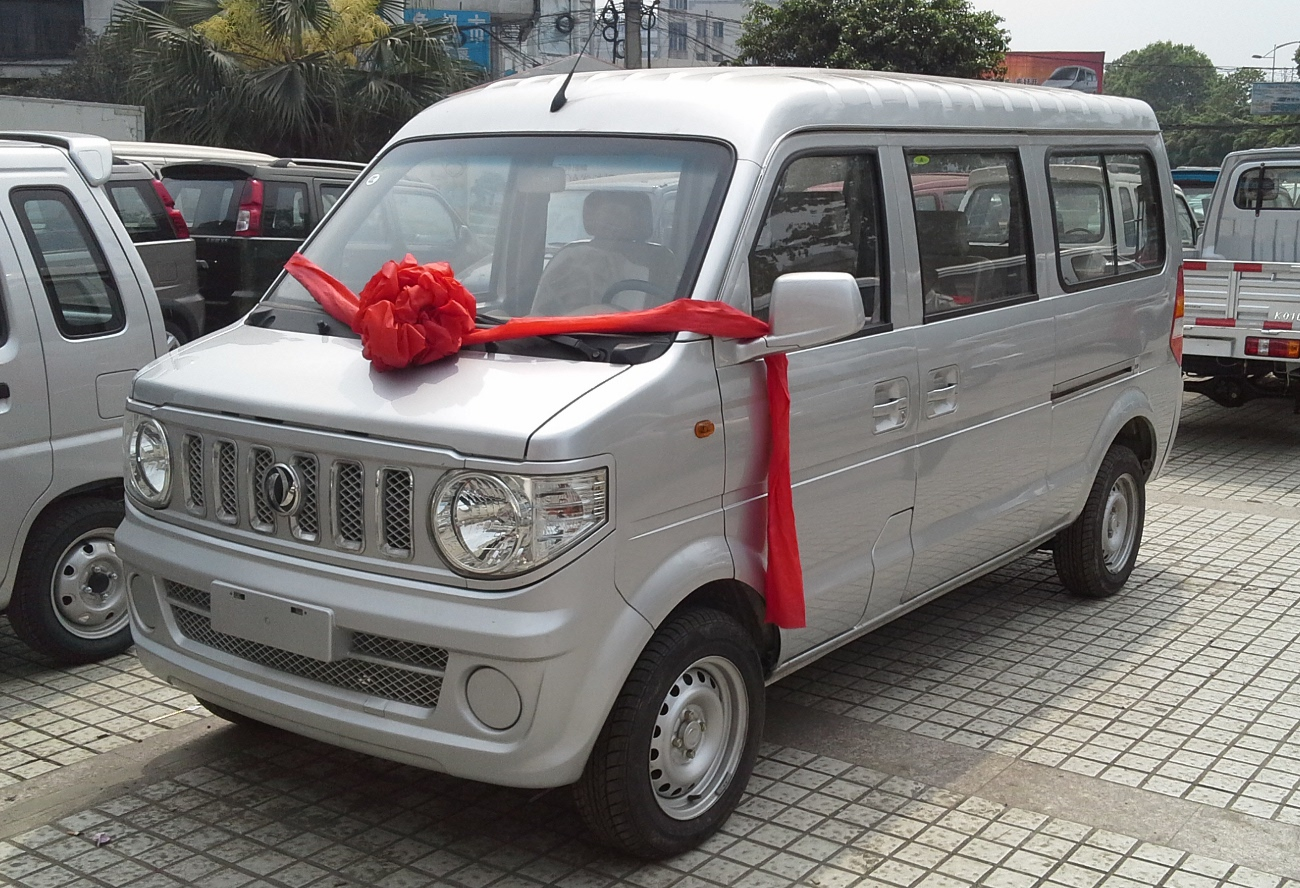
Sokon V29

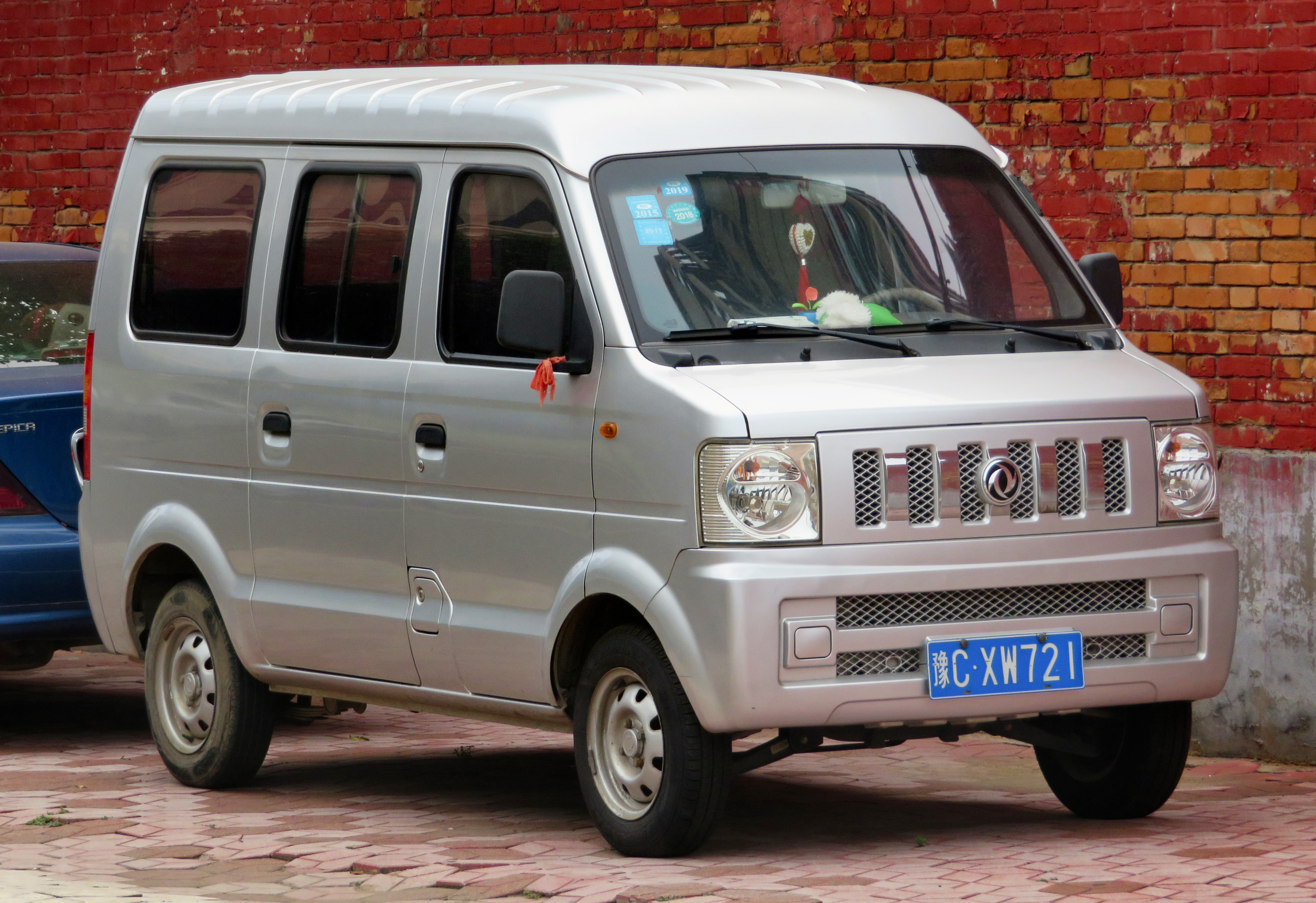
Sokon V07S

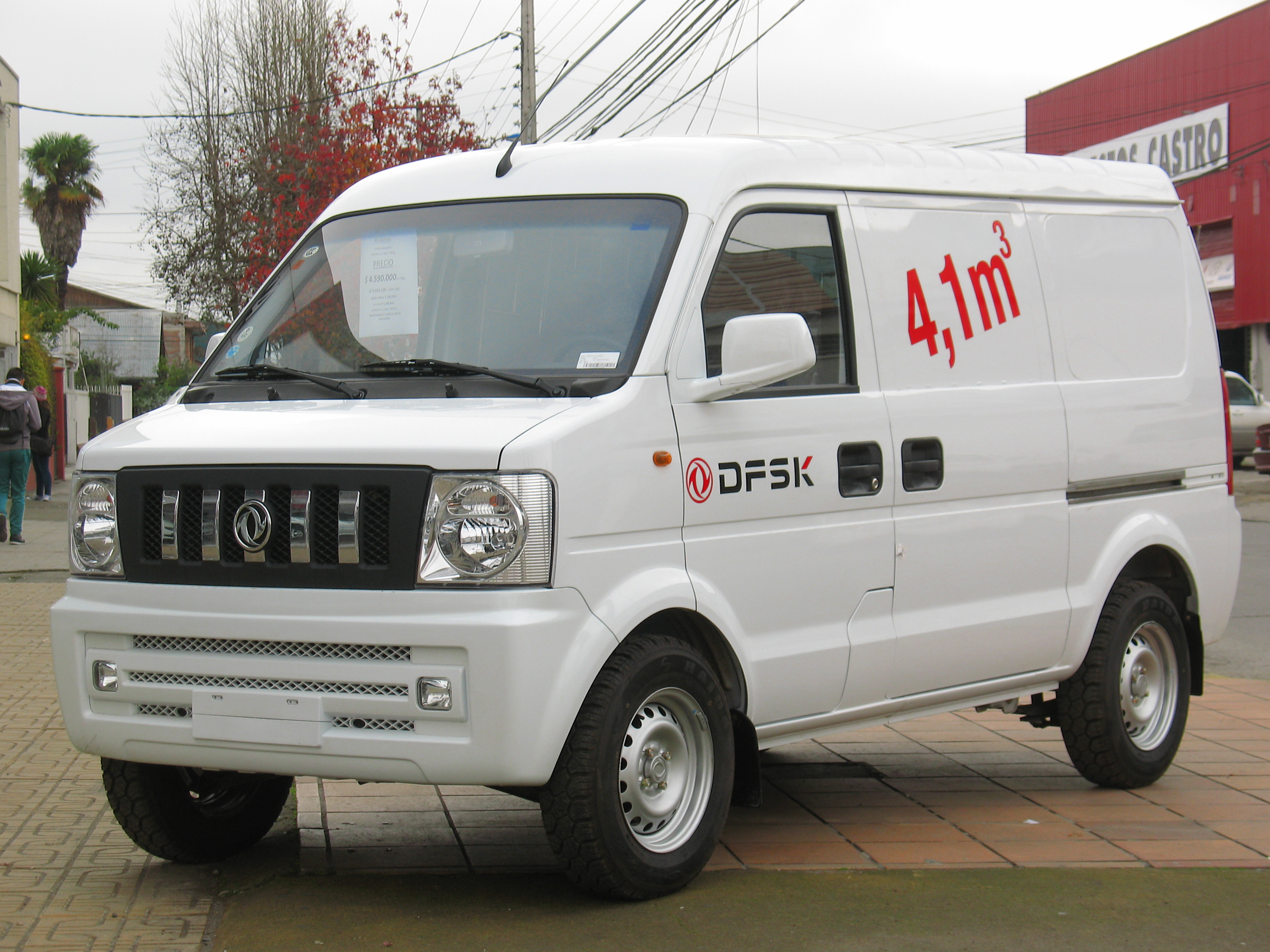
Sokon V27 Cargo

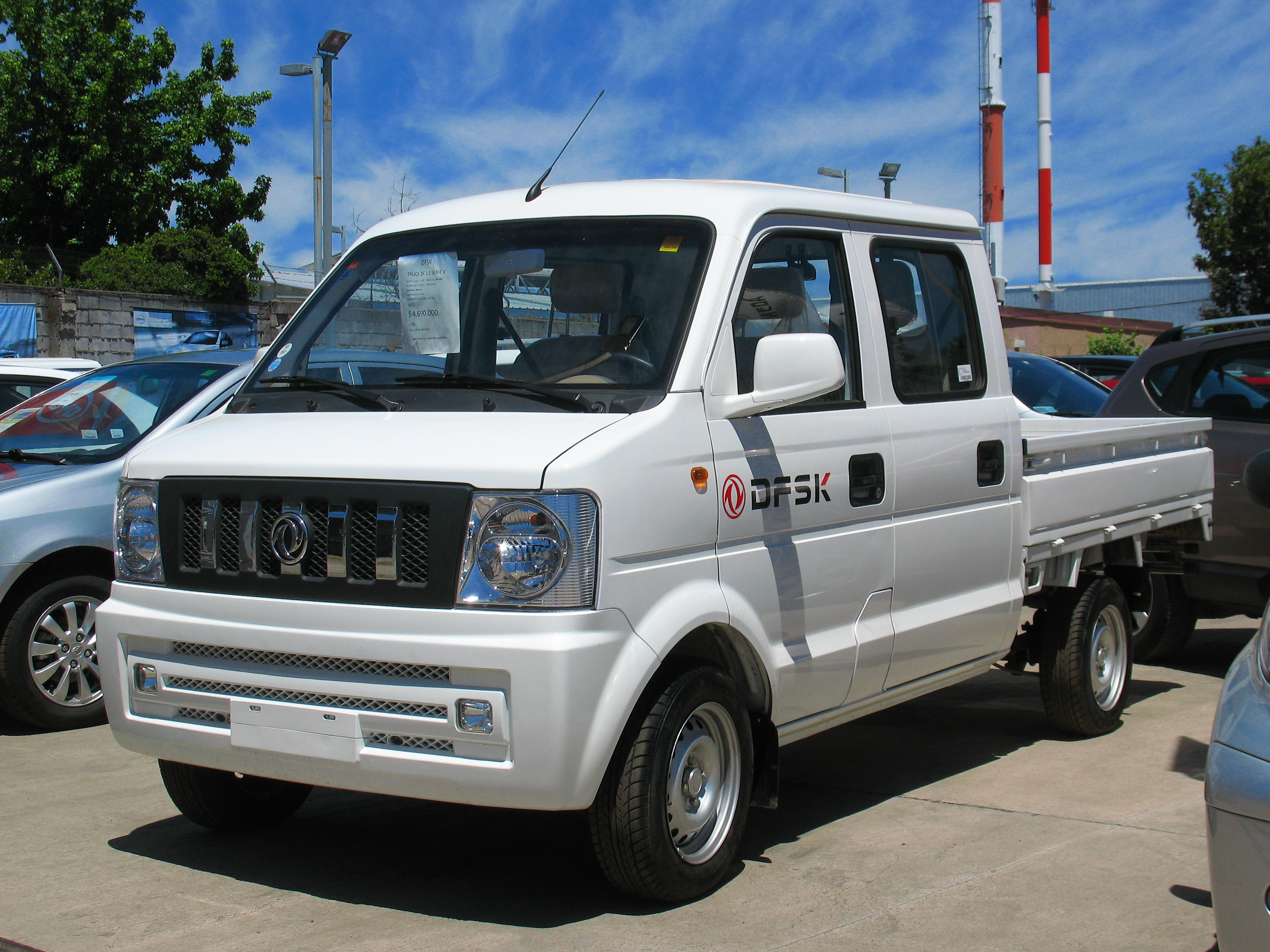
Sokon V22 Crew Cab

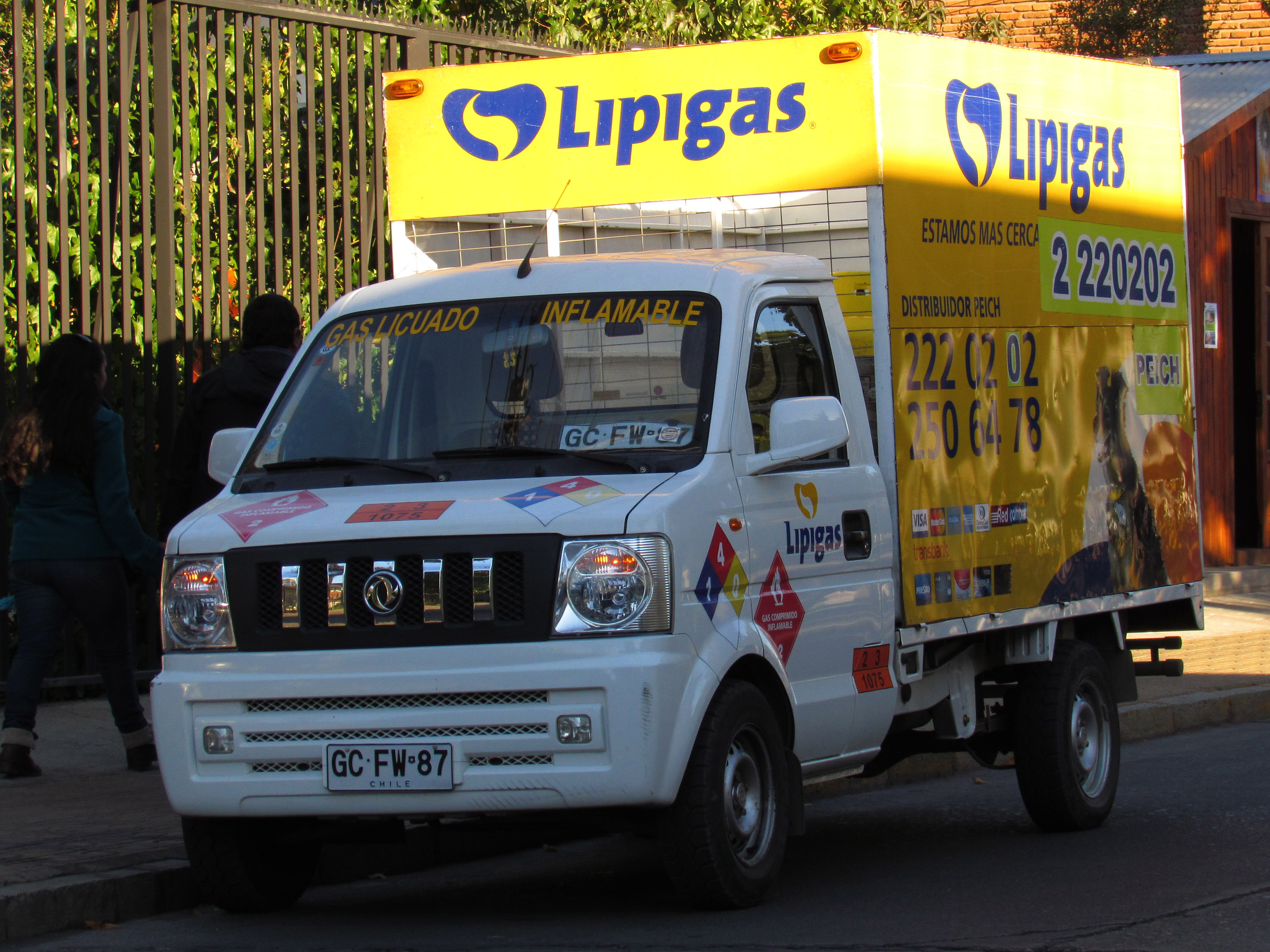
Sokon V21

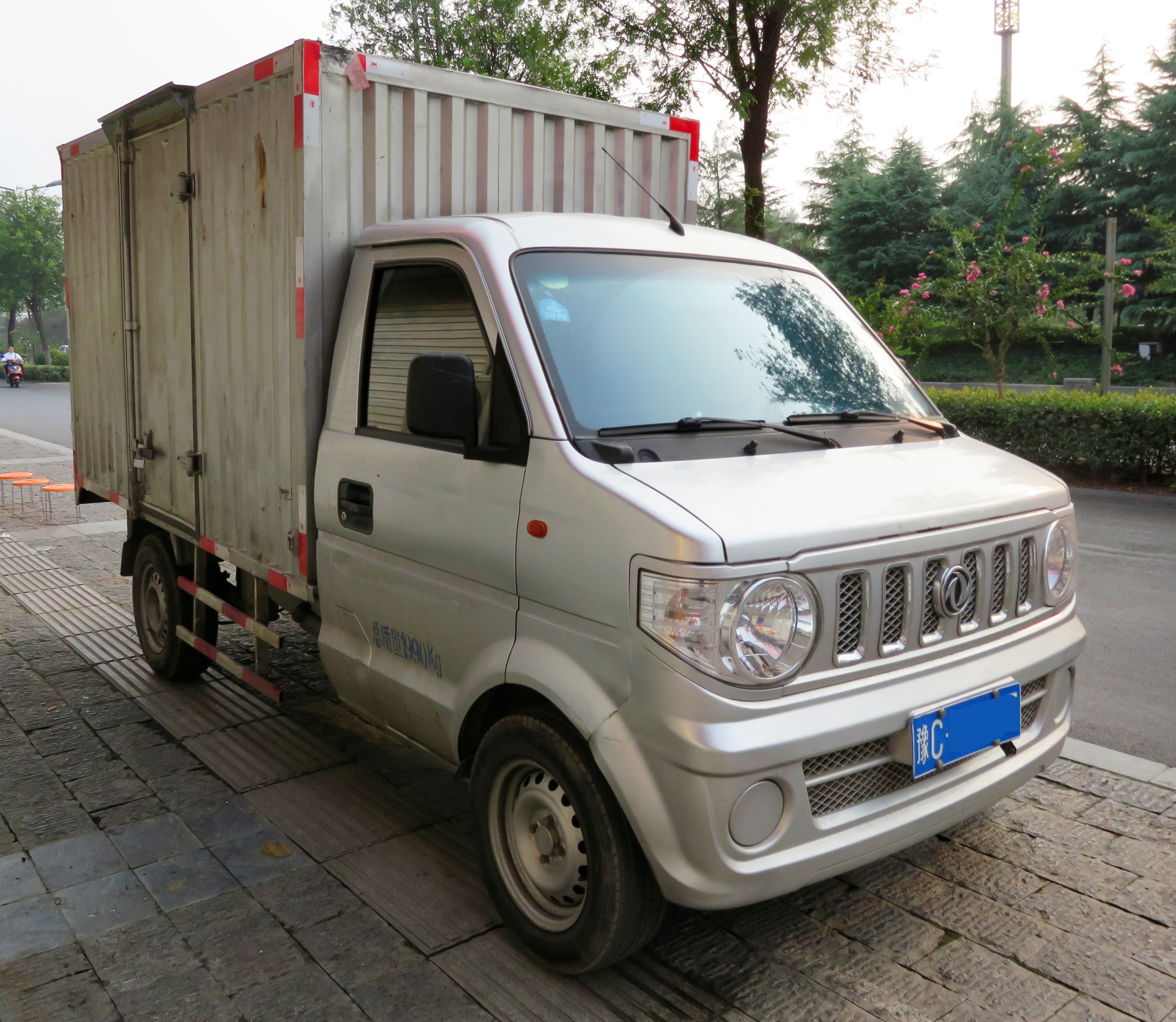
Sokon V21 (2013)

== Joint venture ==
=== Saidou Technology (former Landian) ===
Saidou Technology was originally established as a brand of Seres Group called Landian in March 2023, and underwent a major restructuring in 2026, emerging as an independent entity with significant stakes held by the Chongqing municipal government, Seres, CATL. In May 2026, the company was renamed and subsequently launched its new automotive brand, Aiva, in collaboration with ByteDance.

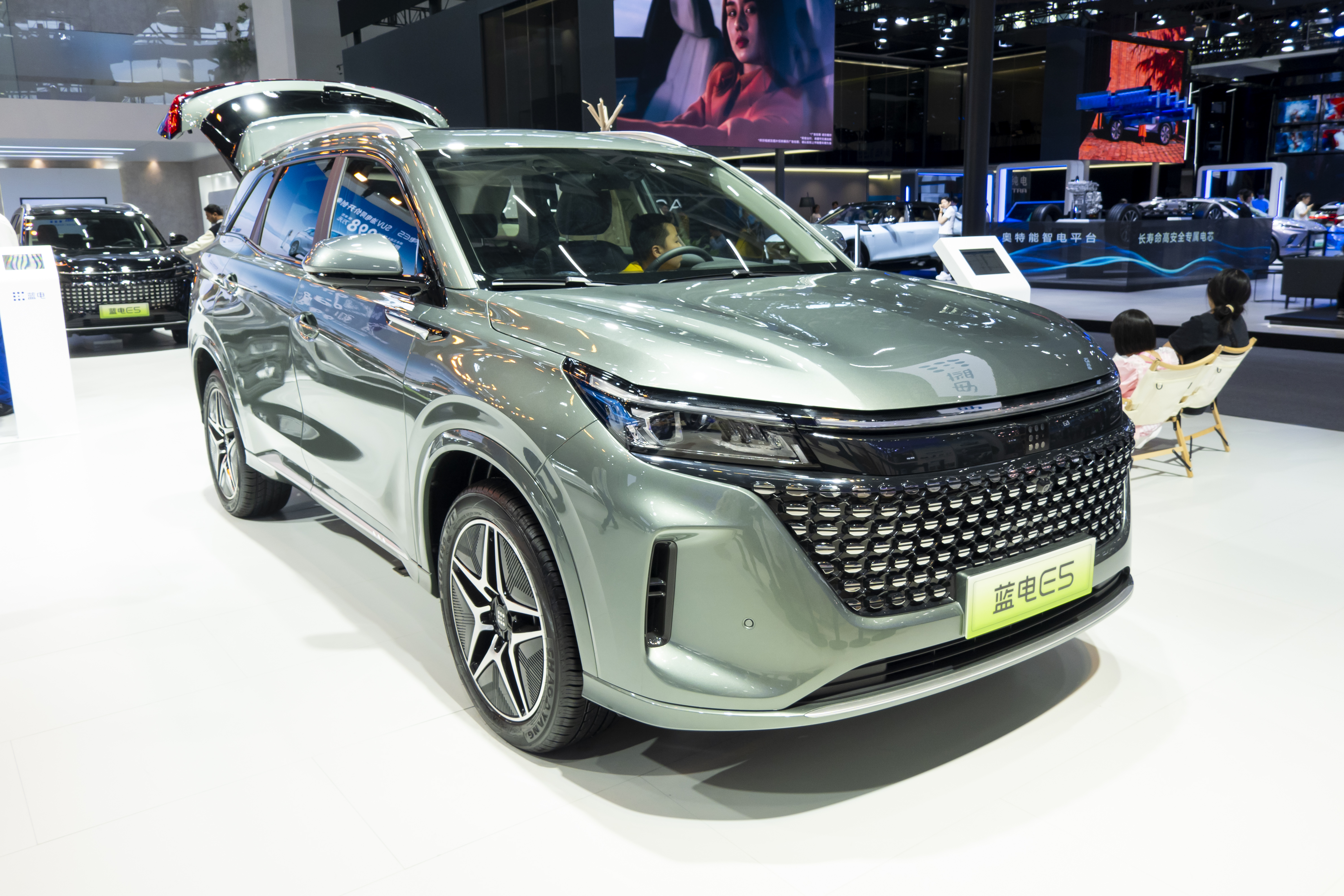
Landian E5

== See also ==
- Automobile manufacturers and brands of China
- List of automobile manufacturers of China
