= Dongfeng Fengguang 330 =

Chinese compact MPV

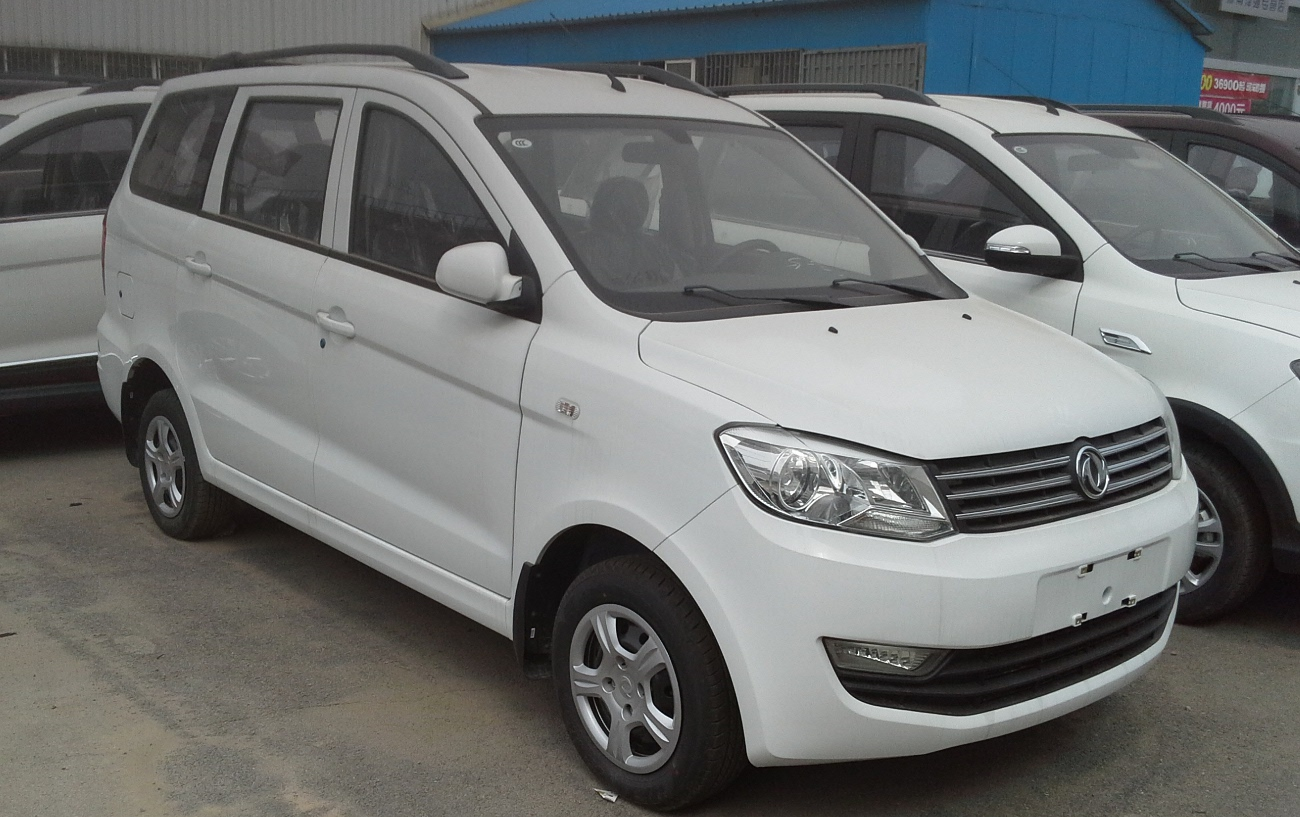

Overview
- Manufacturer: DFSK Motor
- Also called: Dongfeng Fengguang (2013-2014); DFSK Glory 330 (outside China); Dongfeng Fengguang 350 (pre-production 360); Dongfeng Fengguang 360
- Production: 2013–present
- Model years: 2014–present
- Assembly: China

Body and chassis
- Class: Compact MPV
- Body style: 5-door wagon
- Layout: Front engine, front wheel drive
- Related: Dongfeng Fengguang 330S; Dongfeng Fengguang 370

Powertrain
- Engine: Petrol: 1.5 L I4; Diesel: 1.3 L I4 turbodiesel (Fengguang 360)
- Power output: 58 kW (78 hp; 79 PS) (1.3 L turbodiesel); 87 kW (116 hp; 118 PS) (1.5 L petrol)
- Transmission: 5-speed manual

Dimensions
- Wheelbase: 2,725 mm (107.3 in)
- Length: 4,365 mm (171.9 in); 4,510 mm (177.6 in) (Fengguang 360)
- Width: 1,720 mm (67.7 in); 1,725 mm (67.9 in) (Fengguang 360)
- Height: 1,770 mm (69.7 in); 1,810 mm (71.3 in) (Fengguang 360)

The Dongfeng Fengguang 330 is a compact MPV produced by Chinese auto maker Dongfeng Sokon (DFSK), a subsidiary of Dongfeng Motor Co., Ltd.

== Overview ==
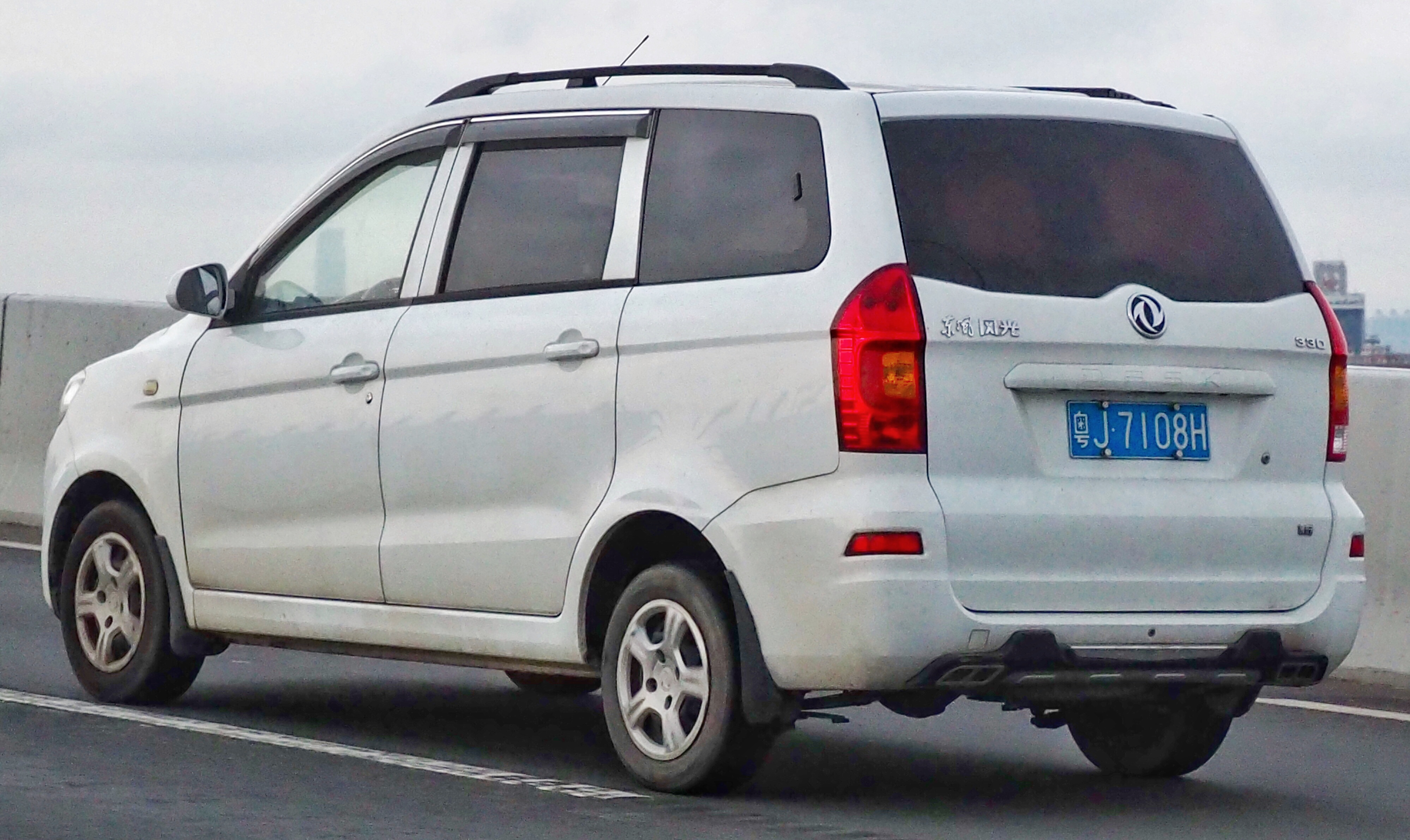
Rear view

The Fengguang 330 debuted in 2014, and was launched in the Chinese auto market in 2015. The Dongfeng Fengguang 330 compact MPV seats seven in a 2-3-2 configuration with prices starting from 32,900 yuan to 44,900 yuan.

The Fengguang 330 later spawned an upgraded and restyled model called the Dongfeng Fengguang 330S in 2017, sharing the main body panels while featuring redesigned front and rear DRGs.

=== Dongfeng Fengguang 360 ===
A crossover version featuring plastic black cladding body lower trim parts called the Fengguang 360 was also available in the Chinese market for the 2015 model year with prices ranging from 57,900 yuan to 74,900 yuan.

The Fengguang 360 model is available with two four-cylinder power plants. The engine options are a 1.3 liter engine with 78 hp and a 1.5 liter engine with 116 hp, both engines are mated to a 5-speed manual transmission.

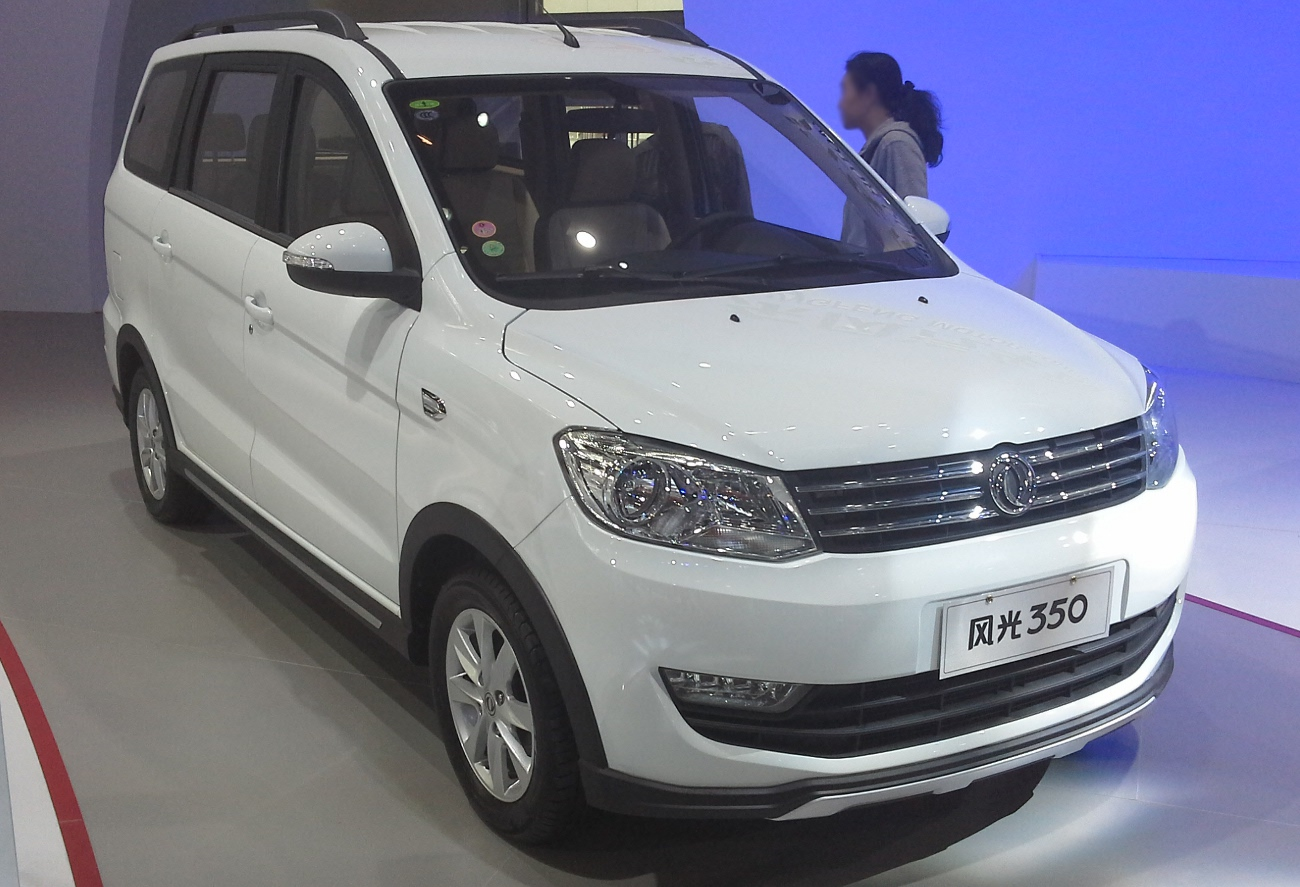
Dongfeng Fengguang 350 (360 pre-production model

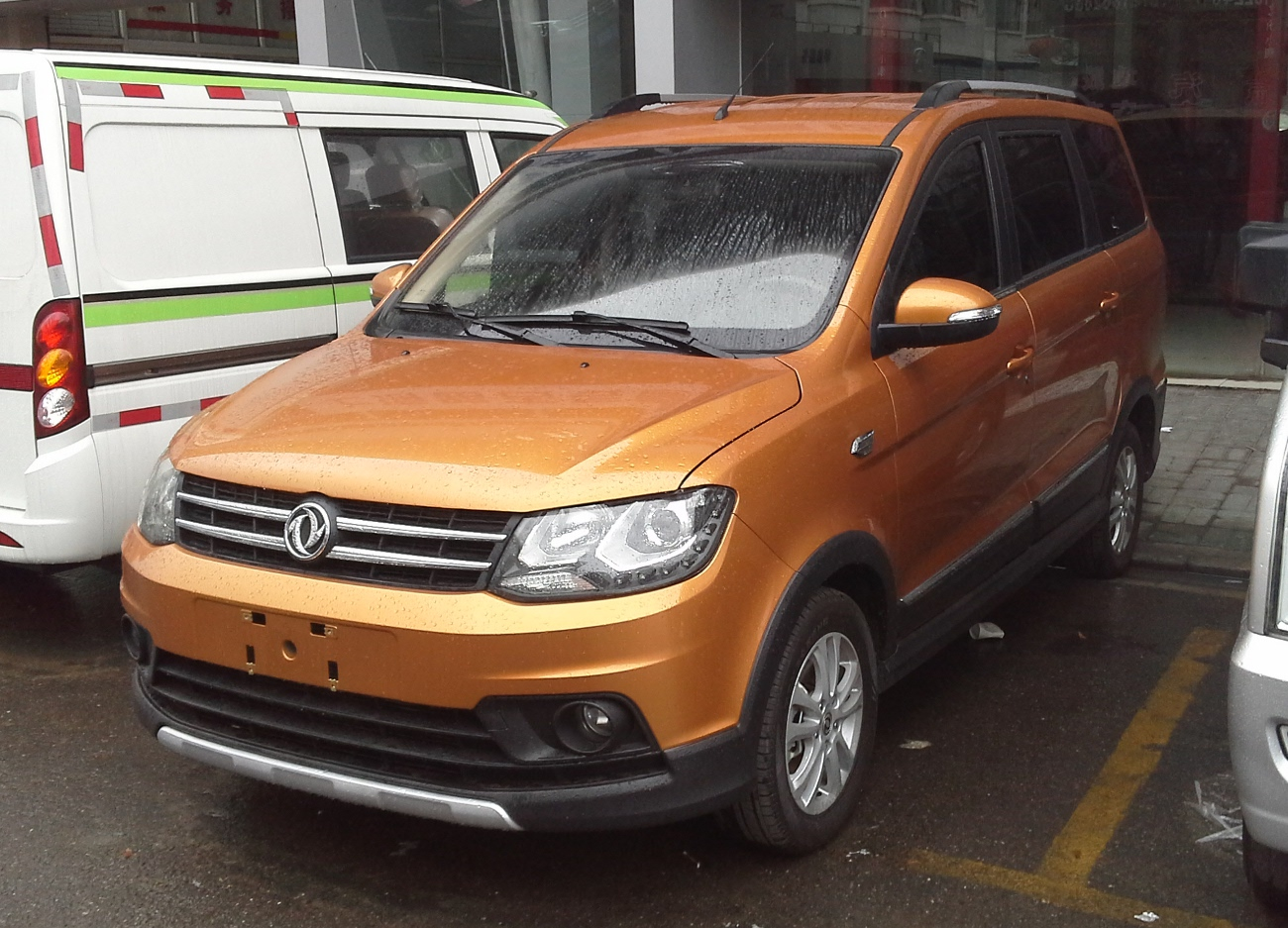
Dongfeng Fengguang 360

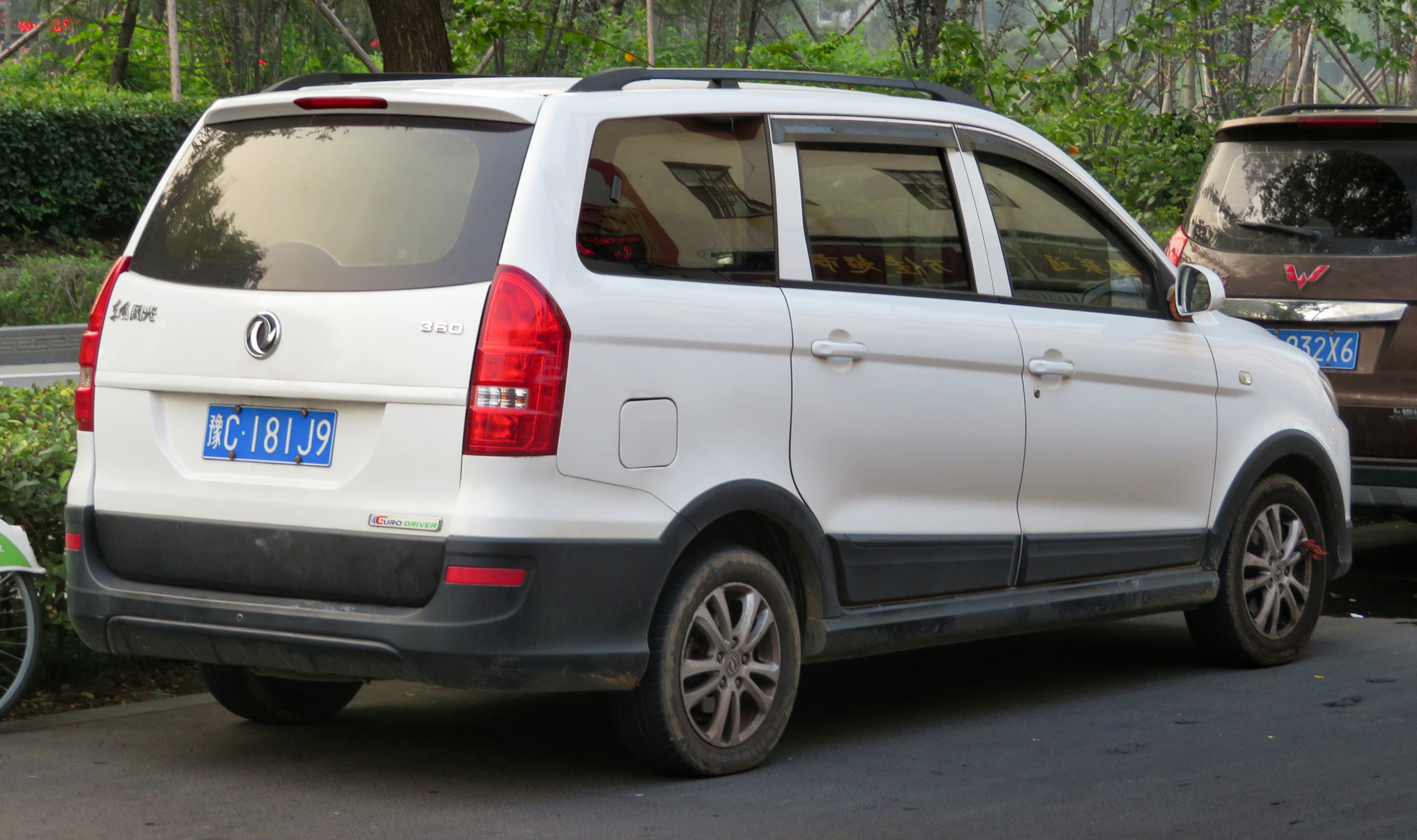
Rear view of the Fengguang 360
