= Dongfeng Fengguang 370 =

Chinese compact MPV

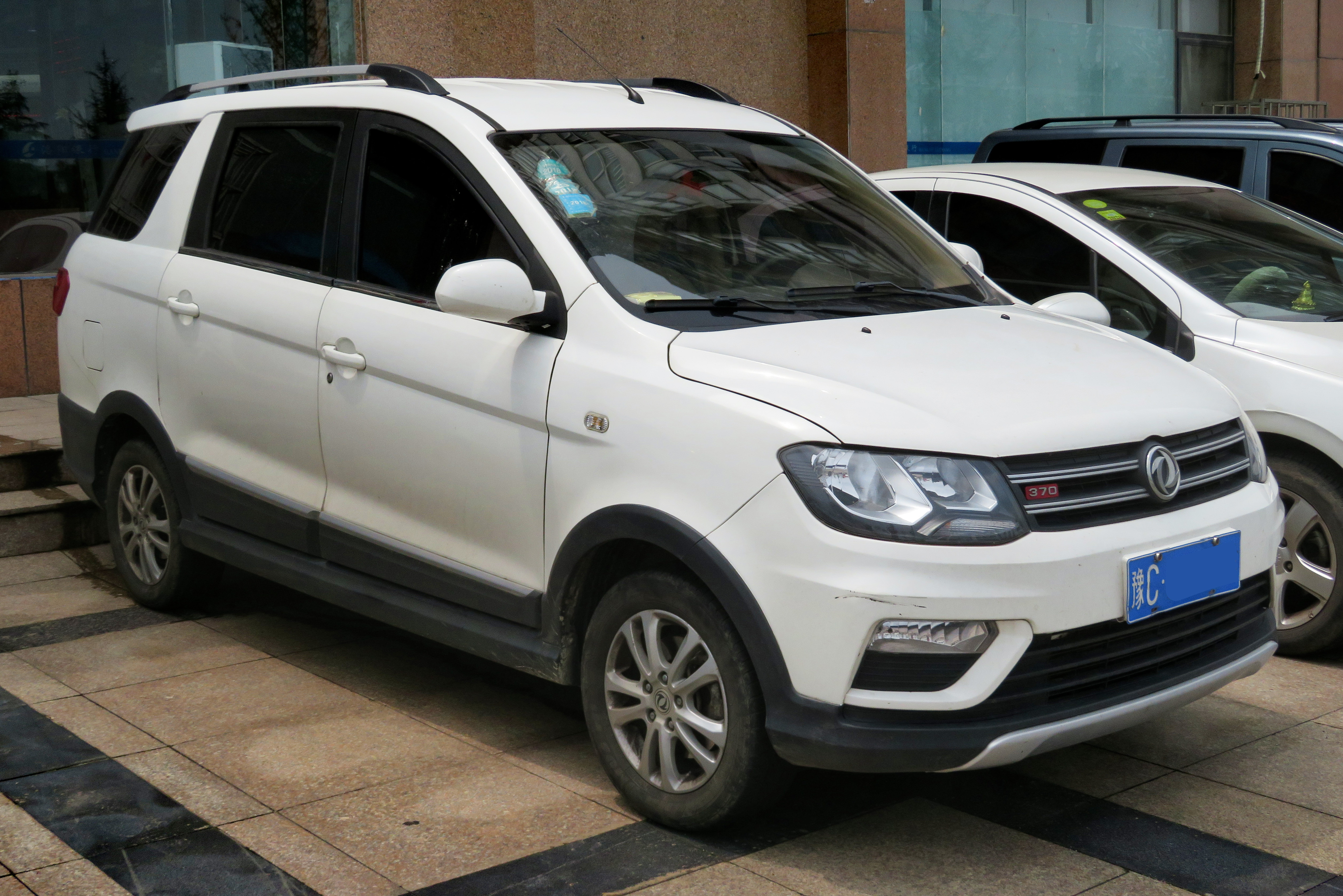
- Fengguang 370

Overview
- Production: 2016–2020
- Model years: 2016–2020

Body and chassis
- Related: Dongfeng Fengguang 360

Powertrain
- Engine: 1.5L I4; 1.6L I4
- Transmission: 5-speed manual; CVT

Dimensions
- Wheelbase: 2,725 mm (107.3 in)
- Length: 4,565 mm (179.7 in)
- Width: 1,725 mm (67.9 in)
- Height: 1,810 mm (71.3 in)
- Curb weight: 1,325–1,345 kg (2,921–2,965 lb)

The Dongfeng Fengguang 370 is a compact MPV produced by Chinese automaker Dongfeng-Xiaokang (Sokon), a subsidiary of Dongfeng Motor Co., Ltd.

== Overview ==
The Fengguang 370 debuted in November 2015 and was launched on the Chinese car market in April 2016. The Dongfeng Fengguang 370 shares its underpinnings with the Dongfeng Fengguang 360 MPV and seats seven in a 2-3-2 configuration with prices starting from 49,900 yuan to 67,900 yuan.

The Fengguang 370 is powered by a 1.5-liter four-cylinder petrol engine developing 116 hp (87 kW) and 148 nm, mated to a five-speed manual transmission.

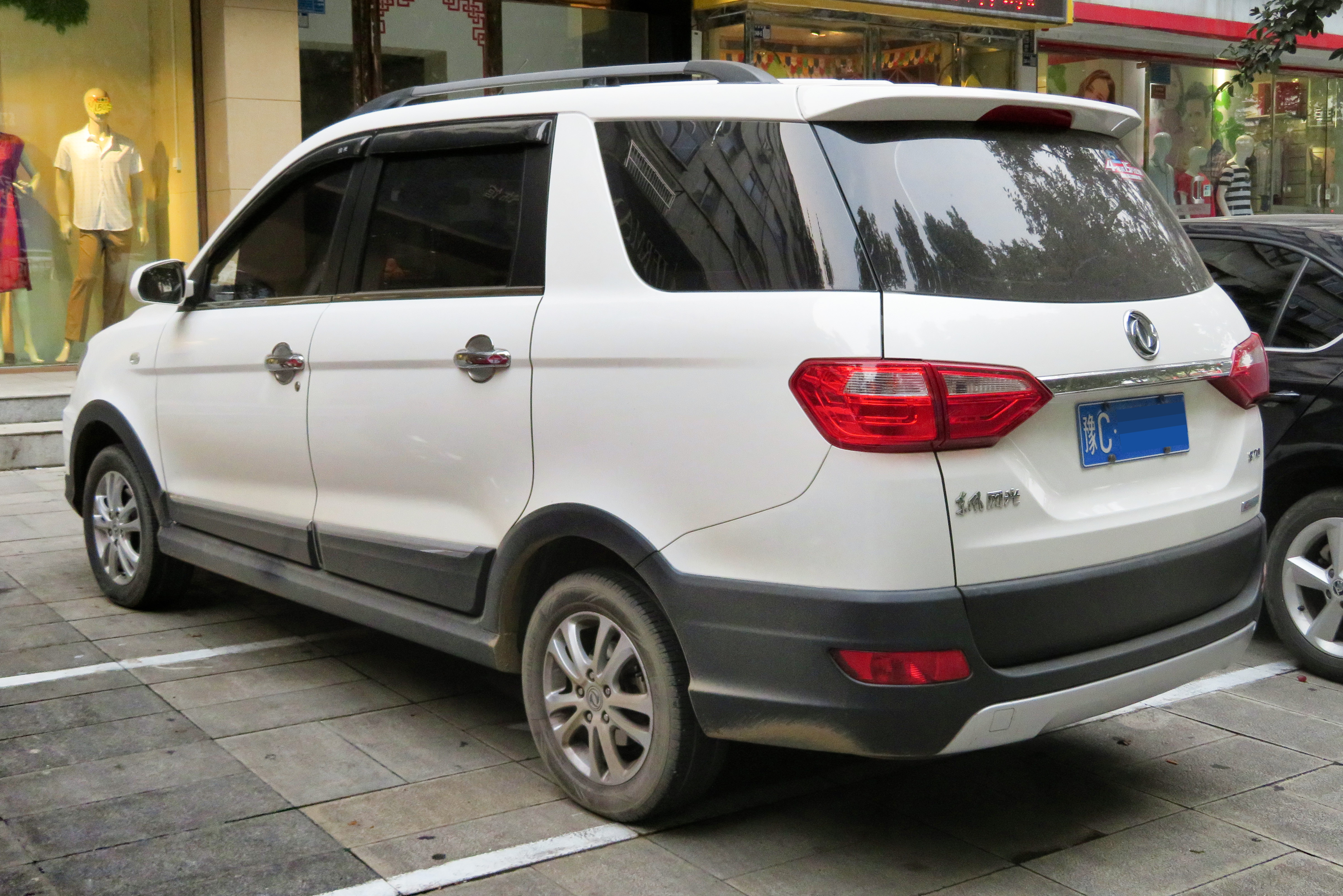
Fengguang 370 (rear)
