= Ruichi EC75 =

Battery electric van

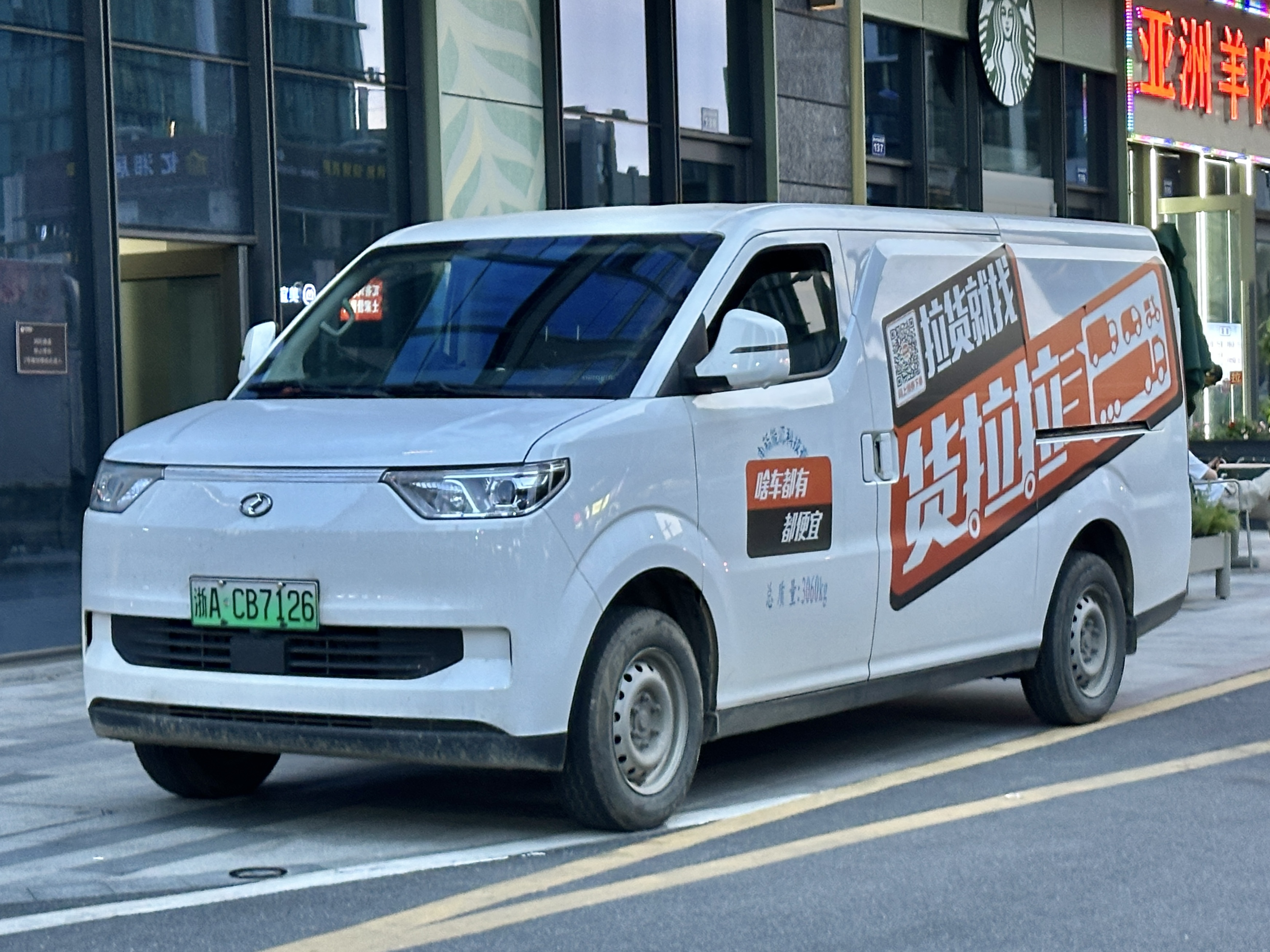

Overview
- Manufacturer: Seres Group (Ruichi New Energy)
- Also called: DFSK EC75; Ruichi R5; Vala Home (camper van variant)
- Production: 2024–present
- Assembly: China: Chongqing

Body and chassis
- Class: Light commercial vehicle
- Body style: 5-door van
- Layout: Front-motor, front-wheel-drive

Powertrain
- Electric motor: Permanent magnet synchronous motor
- Power output: 70 kW (94 hp)
- Battery: Lithium iron phosphate battery
- Electric range: up to 310 km (CLTC)

Dimensions
- Wheelbase: 3,200 mm (126.0 in)
- Length: 5,130 mm (202.0 in)
- Width: 1,860 mm (73.2 in)
- Height: 2,020 mm (79.5 in)

The Ruichi EC75 is a battery electric van produced by Ruichi New Energy (瑞驰新能源), a subsidiary of Seres Group.

== Overview ==
The EC75 is a positioned as the electric van for last-mile delivery and fleet applications. It is offered in both cargo and passenger configurations. The exterior styling features follow typical electric vehicle design cues, including a closed front grille. The cargo variant feature sliding side doors and rear swing doors for loading access, while passenger variants include side glazing and multi-row seating. The cargo variant features a two-seat configuration and an enclosed cargo compartment, intended for logistics and delivery services. The passenger variant offer seating configurations typically ranging from 6 to 9 occupants, and are used for shuttle and light transport services.

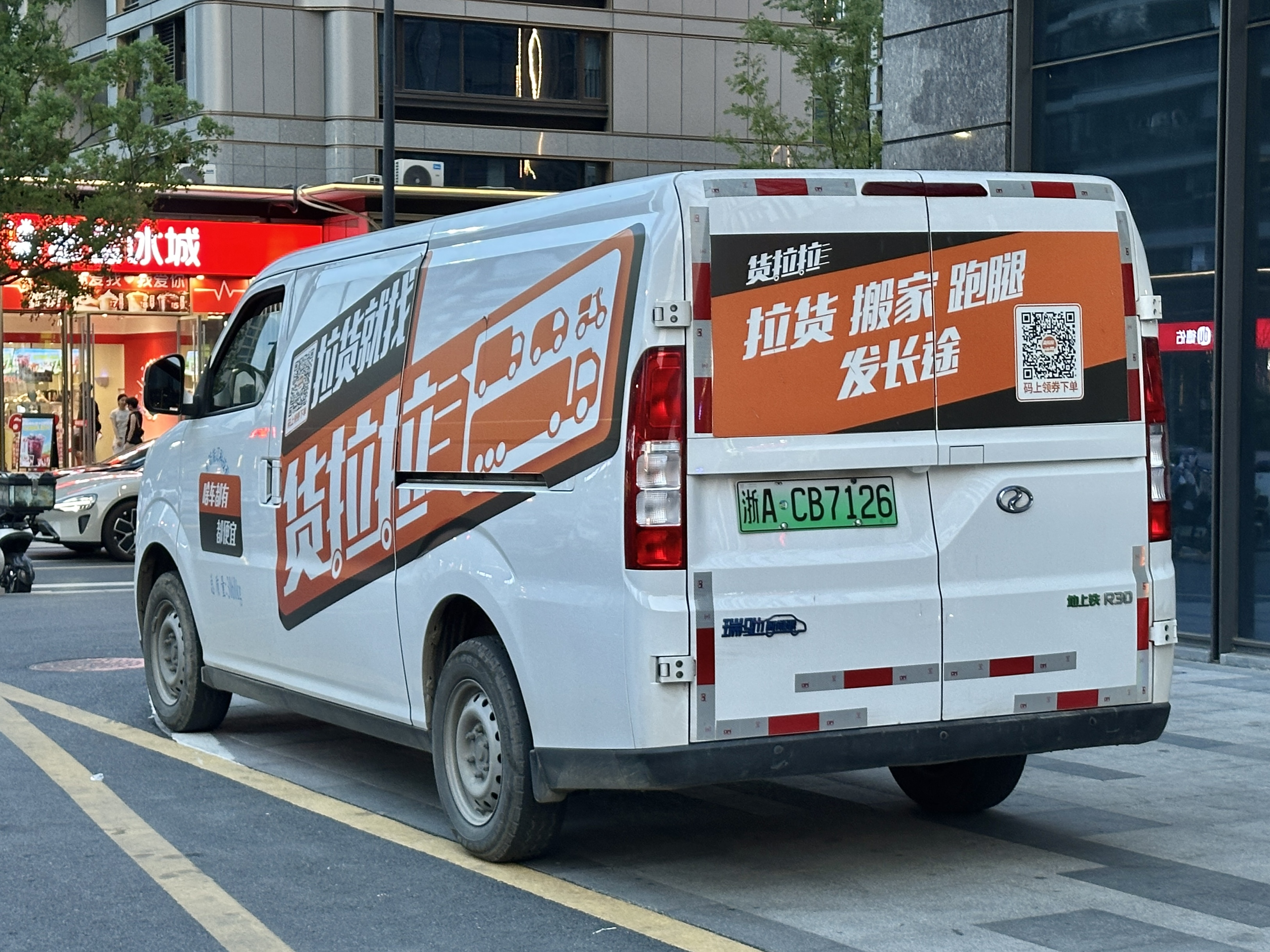
Rear view

== Specifications ==
The EC75 is a powered by a front-mounted permanent magnet synchronous electric motor rated at approximately 70 kW.

The energy is supplied by lithium iron phosphate (LFP) battery packs. Depending on configuration, the vehicle offers a 50.38 kWh battery providing a CLTC-rated range of up to approximately 300 km. The model supports both AC charging and DC fast charging, consistent with typical electric commercial vehicle specifications.

Suspension of the EC75 is front MacPherson independent suspension and rear longitudinal leaf spring non-independent suspension. The front and rear wheels are all disc brakes with ABS and EBD. Electric Power Steering (EPS) is also standard.

== Markets ==
=== Chile ===
The DFSK Chile was introduced as the DFSK EC75 during the Salón Experiencia E in November 2024, with planned to launch in 2025.

=== Philippines ===
The EC75 was sold as the DFSK EC75 by QSJ Motors Philippines from September 2025.

=== South Korea ===
In December 2024, the EVKMC (Electric Vehicle Korea Motor Co., Ltd.) was announced that the EC75 would be launched in the South Korean market.

== Ruichi R5 ==
The Ruichi R5 is a variant based on the EC75, with a restyled front end, a larger dimension, 15.6 inch screen with built in Yuntu OS, and a capacity of 6- to 9- seater for specific passenger models.

Compared to the EC75, the R5 features slightly increased overall length while retaining a similar platform and wheelbase of approximately 3,200 mm.

Dimensionally, the R5 measures approximately 5,170 mm in length, 1,860 mm in width, and 2,020 mm in height, representing a modest increase over the EC75.

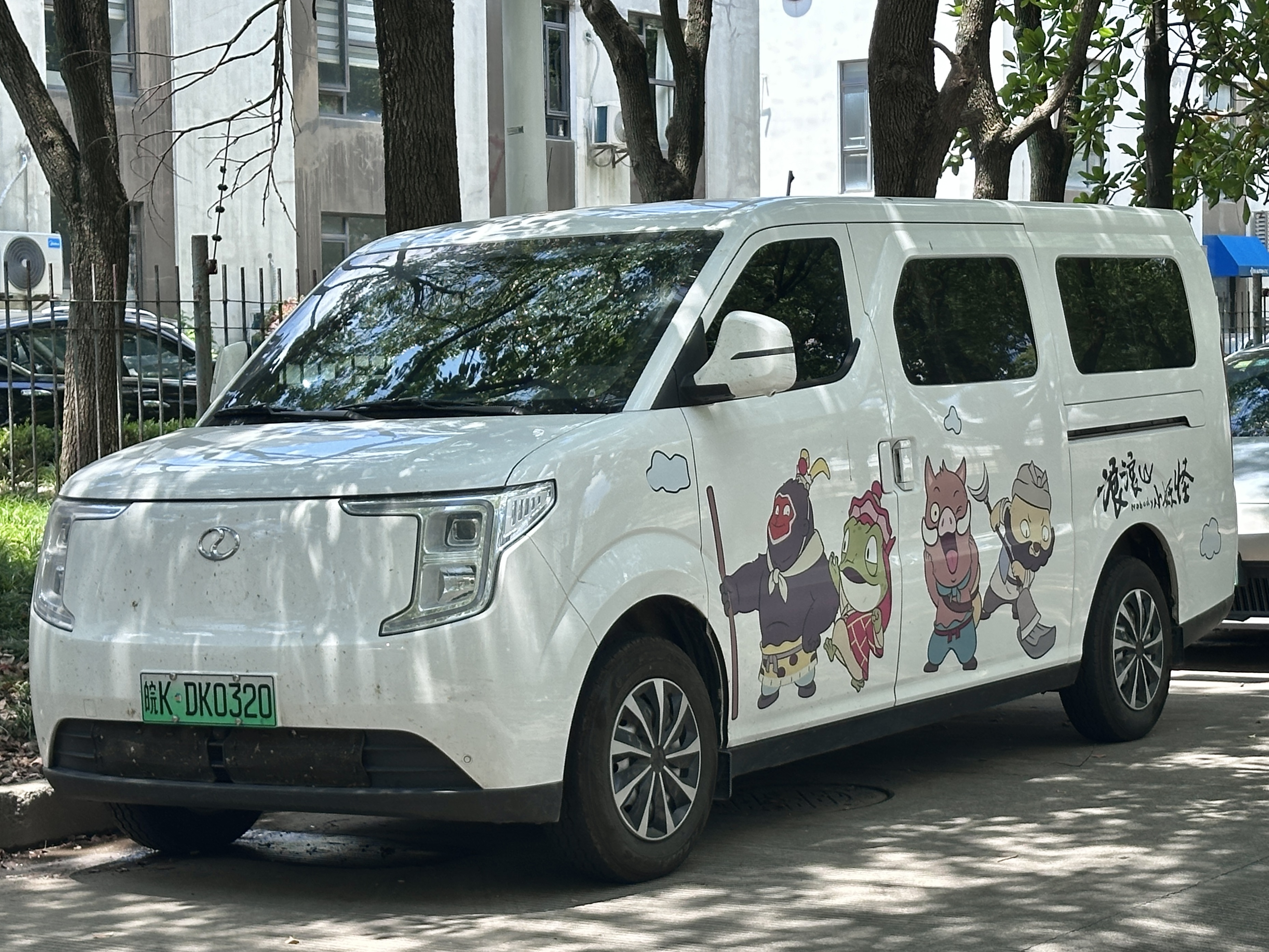
Ruichi R5

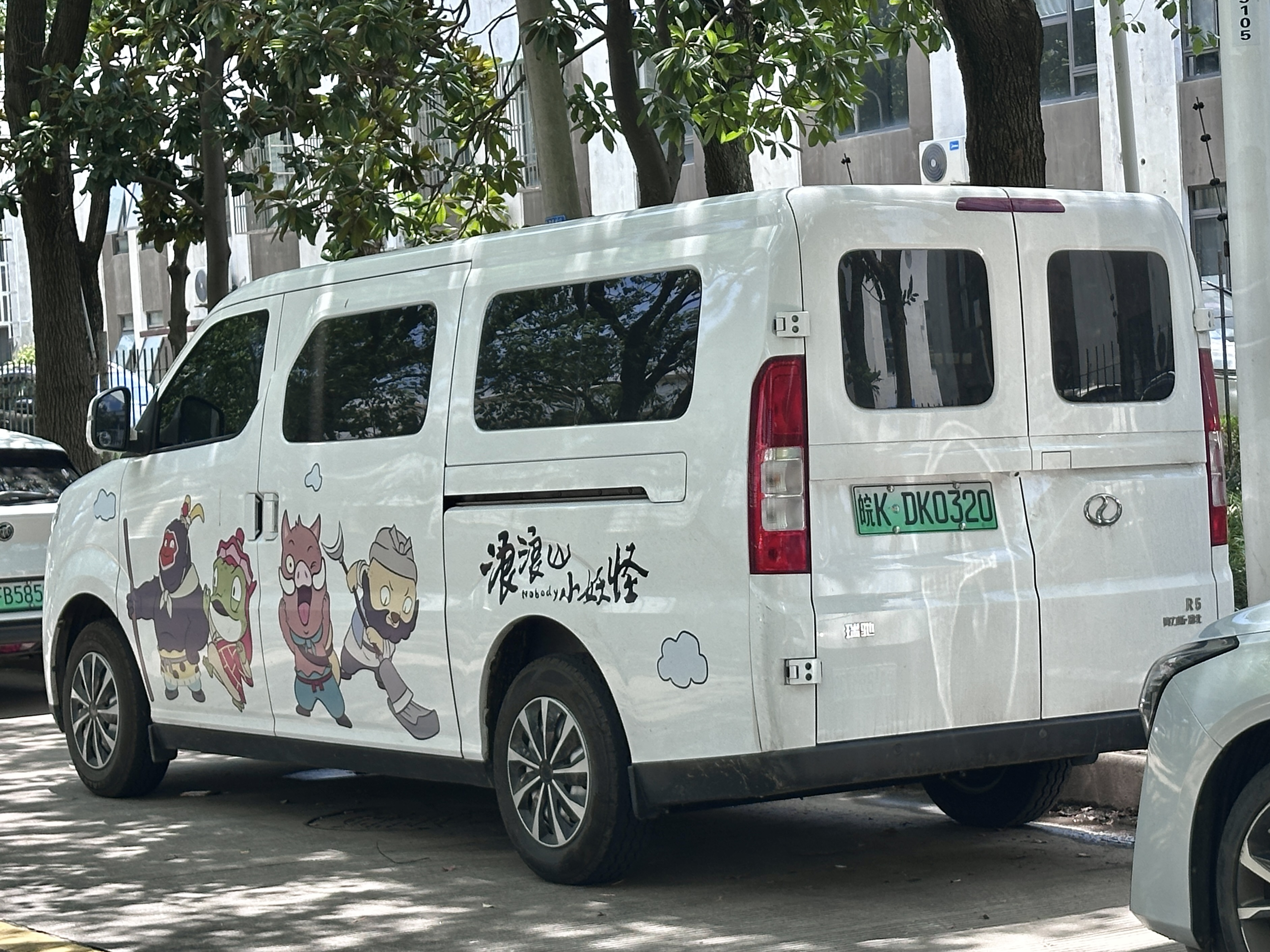
Rear view

== Vala Home ==
The Vala Home is a camper van based on the R5 platform, developed in collaboration with third-party conversion specialists rather than as a standard production model.

The Home features a modified body structure with a raised roof and expanded interior space, allowing for camping-oriented equipment such as sleeping areas, onboard electrical systems, and household appliances.
