= Lists of automobile-related articles =

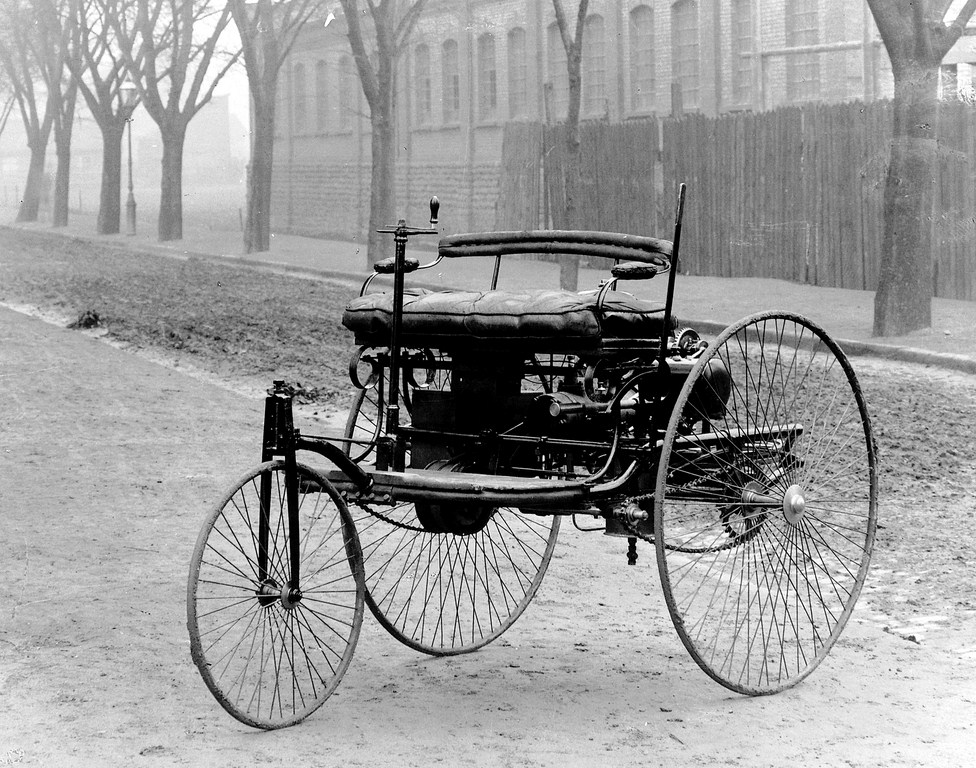
1885 Benz Patent-Motorwagen

Lists of automobile-related articles cover a wide range of topics related to cars. The lists are organized by manufacturer, region, sport, technology and so on.

== General ==
- List of current automobile manufacturers by country
- List of current automobile marques
- List of automobile manufacturers
- List of automobile marques
- List of automobile museums
- List of fictional automobiles
- Portal:Cars
- Orphan (car)
- Timeline of motor vehicle brands
- List of automobiles known for negative reception

== Geographic ==
- List of automobiles manufactured in Argentina
- Automotive industry in Australia
- Automotive industry in Bangladesh
- Automotive industry in Brazil
  - List of automobiles manufactured in Brazil
- Automotive industry in Canada
  - List of automobiles manufactured in Ontario
- Automotive industry in China
  - List of automobile manufacturers of China
  - List of foreign brand vehicles made by automobile manufacturers of China
- List of Czech automobiles
- Automotive industry in France
  - List of automobile manufacturers of France
- Automotive industry in Germany
  - List of automobile manufacturers of Germany
- Automotive industry in India
  - Automotive industry in Chennai
- Automotive industry in Iran
- Automotive industry in Ireland
- Automotive industry in Italy
  - List of automobile manufacturers of Italy
- Automotive industry in Japan
  - List of automobile manufacturers of Japan
  - Timeline of Japanese automobiles
- Automotive industry in Mexico
- Automotive industry in New Zealand
- Automotive industry in North Korea
- Automotive industry in Pakistan
- Automotive industry in Romania
- Automotive industry in Russia
- Automotive industry in South Korea
- Automotive industry in the Soviet Union
- Automotive industry in Spain
- List of Spanish automobiles
- Automotive industry in Sweden
  - List of automobile manufacturers of Sweden
- Automotive industry in Turkey
- Automotive industry in the United Kingdom
  - List of car manufacturers of the United Kingdom
- Automotive industry in the United States
  - List of automobiles manufactured in the United States
  - List of automobile manufacturers of the United States
  - List of defunct automobile manufacturers of the United States
- List of Asian automobile manufacturers
- List of Eastern European automobiles
- List of Western European automobile manufacturers
- List of microcars by country of origin

== Motorsport ==
- List of international auto racing colors
- List of exclusively sports car manufacturers

== Organizations ==
- European Automobile Manufacturers Association
- Organisation Internationale des Constructeurs d'Automobiles
- SAE International
- Automotive Research Association of India

== Sales and service ==
- List of automobile sales by model
- List of bestselling automobiles
- Filling station
- List of historic filling stations

== Superlatives ==
- List of automotive superlatives
- List of fastest production cars by acceleration
- List of production car speed records
- List of production cars by power output
- List of longest consumer road vehicles
- Most expensive cars sold in auction

== Technology ==
- List of diesel automobiles
- List of production battery electric vehicles
- List of fuel cell vehicles

== Types ==
- Car body style
- List of buses
- List of Mini-based cars
- List of sport utility vehicles
- List of badge engineered vehicles
- List of "M" series military vehicles
- List of sports cars

== Vehicles by manufacturer and marque ==
- List of Acura vehicles
- List of Audi vehicles
- List of Aston Martin vehicles
- List of BAIC vehicles
- List of Bentley vehicles
- List of BMW vehicles
- List of Bugatti vehicles
- List of Buick vehicles
- List of BYD Auto vehicles
- List of Cadillac vehicles
- List of Changan Automobile vehicles
- List of Chery vehicles
- List of Chevrolet vehicles
- List of Chrysler vehicles
- List of Citroën vehicles
- List of Dacia vehicles
- List of Daihatsu vehicles
- List of DeSoto vehicles
- List of Dodge vehicles
- List of Dongfeng vehicles
- List of FAW vehicles
- List of Ferrari road cars
- List of Fiat vehicles
- List of Ford vehicles
- List of GAC vehicles
- List of Geely vehicles
- List of Genesis vehicles
- List of Geo vehicles
- List of GMC vehicles
- List of Great Wall Motor vehicles
- List of HIMA vehicles
- List of Holden vehicles
- List of Honda vehicles
- List of Hyundai vehicles
- List of Infiniti vehicles
- List of Iran Khodro vehicles
- List of JAC Group vehicles
- List of Jeep vehicles
- List of Kia vehicles
- List of KGM vehicles
- List of Lamborghini automobiles
- List of Leapmotor vehicles
- List of Lexus vehicles
- List of Li Auto vehicles
- List of Lincoln vehicles
- List of Maserati vehicles
- List of Mazda vehicles
- List of Mercedes-Benz vehicles
- List of Mercury vehicles
- List of Mitsubishi Motors vehicles
- List of MG vehicles
- List of Nissan vehicles
- List of NIO vehicles
- List of Opel vehicles
- List of Peugeot vehicles
- List of Proton vehicles
- List of Plymouth vehicles
- List of Pontiac vehicles
- List of Porsche vehicles
- List of Renault vehicles
- List of Rivian vehicles
- List of Saab vehicles
- List of SAIC vehicles
- List of SEAT vehicles
- List of Seres Group vehicles
- List of Škoda vehicles
- List of Subaru vehicles
- List of Suzuki vehicles
- List of Tesla vehicles
- List of Toyota vehicles
- List of Vauxhall vehicles
- List of Venturi vehicles
- List of Volkswagen vehicles
- List of Volvo vehicles

== List of manufacturers by motor vehicle production ==
- AvtoVAZ
- BAIC Group
- BMW
- Changan Automobile
- Chrysler
- Daihatsu
- Daimler AG
- Dongfeng Motor Corporation
- Dongfeng Motor Group
- FAW Group
- Ferrari
- Ford Motor Company
- Geely
- General Motors
  - GM Korea
- Great Wall Motors
- Honda
- Hyundai Motor Group
- Mazda
- Mitsubishi
  - Mitsubishi Motors
- Nissan
- Renault
- SAIC Motor
- Stellantis
- Subaru
- Suzuki
- Tata Motors
- Toyota
- Volkswagen Group

== Awards ==
=== General ===
- Automotive Hall of Fame
- Car of the Year
- International Car of the Year
- World Car of the Year

=== Geographic ===
- Canadian Car of the Year
- Car of the Year Japan
- European Car of the Year
- North American Car of the Year
- Semperit Irish Car of the Year

=== Technology ===
- International Engine of the Year
- Louis Schwitzer Award
- PACE Award
- Ward's 10 Best Engines

=== Magazine ===
- Automobile Magazine All-Stars
- Motor Trend Car of the Year
- RJC Car of the Year
- Wheels Car of the Year

== List of engines Automotives ==
- List of BMW engines
- List of Ferrari engines
- List of Ford engines
- List of Hyundai engines
- List of Isuzu engines
- List of Mercedes-Benz engines
- List of Mitsubishi Motors engines
- List of Nissan engines
- List of Porsche engines
- List of PSA engines
- List of Renault engines
- List of Subaru engines
- List of Suzuki engines
- List of Toyota engines
- List of Volkswagen Group engines
- List of Volvo engines

== Steam Vehicles ==
- List of steam car makers
- List of traction engine manufacturers
