= List of Seres Group vehicles =

This is a list of current and former automobiles produced by Chinese automaker Seres Group, under its brands of Ruichi, Landian, Fengon and DFSK.

For AITO, the brand in cooperation with Huawei under the Harmony Intelligent Mobility Alliance (HIMA), see List of HIMA vehicles.

== Current vehicles ==
=== Ruichi ===
Chongqing Ruichi Automobiles was established in September 2003. The company is a fully funded subsidiary of Seres Group for pure electric commercial vehicles.

Image	Models	Chinese name	Introduction	Generation	Vehicle description
Van
	Ruichi EC35	瑞驰EC35	2020s	First	Van, NEV
	Ruichi EC75	瑞驰EC75	2024	First	Van, NEV
	Ruichi ES50	瑞驰ES50	2020s	First	Van, NEV
	Ruichi R5	瑞驰R5	2025	First	Van, NEV
Pickup truck
	Ruichi C5	瑞驰C5	2025	First	Pickup truck, NEV
	Ruichi EC31	瑞驰EC31	2020s	First	Pickup truck, NEV
	Ruichi EC71L/EC72	瑞驰EC71L/EC72	2020s	First	Pickup truck, NEV
	Ruichi ED71	瑞驰ED71	2020s	First	Pickup truck, NEV

==== Muyeah ====
RVs based on and wholly owned by Ruichi.

- Vala
  - Home
  - Pro
    - Retro edition
    - Fashion edition
  - Pure electric edition
- Shiguang
- Zhuiguang
- Xinghe
- Yuanxing

=== Landian ===
Landian is budget electric vehicles brand by Seres Group which unveiled in March 2023. The word Landian literally means blue electricity (蓝电) in Chinese.

Image	Models	Chinese name	Introduction	Generation	Vehicle description
SUV
	Landian E3	蓝电E3	2020s	First	Subcompact SUV, NEV
	Landian E5	蓝电E5	2023	First	Compact SUV, NEV

=== Fengon ===
Fengon (or DFSK Glory for foreign markets) formerly known as Dongfeng Fengguang (Chinese: 东风风光; lit. 'East wind Scenery'), is the sub-brand of Seres that produces passenger vehicles. Established in 2008, Fengon brand targets at affordable compact MPVs and SUVs. It used to be a joint-venture brand with Dongfeng Group but was fully acquired by Seres Group in 2022. The Fengon brand began to replace the former Dongfeng logo with its own Fengon logo in models after the acquisition.

Image	Models	Chinese name	Introduction	Generation	Vehicle description
City car
	Fengon Mini EV	风光MINIEV	2021	1st	City car, BEV
SUV
	Fengon 500	风光500	2019	First	Subcompact SUV
	Fengon 580	风光580	2016	Second	Compact SUV
	Fengon S560	风光S560	2017	First	Compact SUV
Minivan
	Fengon 380	风光380/E380	2022	First	Minivan, ICE/NEV

=== DFSK ===
The DFSK (Dongfeng Sokon, Chinese: 东风小康) is a brand of Seres that produces light commercial vehicles.

Image	Models	Chinese name	Introduction	Vehicle description
Van/Pickup truck
	DFSK C-Series	东风小康C系列	2012	Van/Pickup truck
	DFSK K-Series	东风小康K系列	2004	Van/Pickup truck

== Discontinued vehicles ==
=== Fengon ===
Image	Models	Chinese name	Introduction	Discontinued	Vehicle description
SUV
	Fengon ix5	风光ix5	2018	2023	Compact SUV
	Fengon ix7	风光ix7	2019	2023	Mid-size SUV
Minivan
	Fengon 350	风光350	2016	2020	Minivan
	Fengon 360	风光360	2015	2019	Minivan
	Fengon 370	风光370	2016	2020	Minivan

=== DFSK ===
Image	Models	Chinese name	Introduction	Discontinued	Vehicle description
Van/Pickup truck
	DFSK V-Series	东风小康V系列	2009	2010s	Van/Pickup truck
