= List of automobiles manufactured in the United States =

The following is a list of passenger automobiles assembled in the United States. Note that this refers to final assembly only, and that in many cases the majority of added value work is performed in other regions through manufacture of component parts from raw materials.

Manufacturer	Brand	State	Facility	Model	Percentage of model's contents made in the U.S. or Canada (2025)
BMW	BMW	South Carolina	BMW Plant Spartanburg	X3	9% ▼
BMW	BMW	South Carolina	BMW Plant Spartanburg	X5	32% ▼
BMW	BMW	South Carolina	BMW Plant Spartanburg	X6	32% ▲
BMW	BMW	South Carolina	BMW Plant Spartanburg	X7	21% ▼
BMW	BMW	South Carolina	BMW Plant Spartanburg	XM	26% ▲
Faraday Future	Faraday Future	California	FF ieFactory California	FF 91	N/A
Ford Motor Company	Ford	Michigan	Michigan Assembly Plant	Bronco	42% ▲
Ford Motor Company	Ford	Kentucky	Louisville Assembly Plant	Escape	45% ▲ (2026)
Ford Motor Company	Ford	Kentucky	Kentucky Truck Plant	Expedition	55% ▲ (2026)
Ford Motor Company	Ford	Kentucky	Kentucky Truck Plant	Expedition MAX	N/A
Ford Motor Company	Ford	Illinois	Chicago Assembly Plant	Explorer	43% ▲
Ford Motor Company	Ford	Michigan	Dearborn Truck Plant	F-150	45% ▲
Ford Motor Company	Ford	Missouri	Kansas City Assembly Plant	F-150	45% ▲
Ford Motor Company	Ford	Michigan	Flat Rock Assembly Plant	Mustang	55% ▲ (2026)
Ford Motor Company	Ford	Michigan	Michigan Assembly Plant	Ranger	46% ▲
Ford Motor Company	Ford	Ohio	Ohio Assembly Plant	Super Duty	N/A
Ford Motor Company	Ford	Kentucky	Kentucky Truck Plant	Super Duty	N/A
Ford Motor Company	Ford	Missouri	Kansas City Assembly Plant	Transit	N/A
Ford Motor Company	Lincoln	Illinois	Chicago Assembly Plant	Aviator	55% ▲ (2026)
Ford Motor Company	Lincoln	Kentucky	Louisville Assembly Plant	Corsair	50% ▲
Ford Motor Company	Lincoln	Kentucky	Kentucky Truck Plant	Navigator	55% ▲
Geely	Volvo	South Carolina	Volvo Car Charleston Plant	EX90	20%-25%
General Motors	Buick	Michigan	Lansing Delta Township Assembly Plant	Enclave	35% ▲
General Motors	Cadillac	Michigan	General Motors Technical Center	Celestiq	43%
General Motors	Cadillac	Michigan	Lansing Grand River Assembly Plant	CT5	35% ▼ (2026)
General Motors	Cadillac	Texas	Arlington Assembly Plant	Escalade	37%
General Motors	Cadillac	Michigan	Factory ZERO Detroit/Hamtramck Assembly	Escalade IQ	38% ▲ (2026)
General Motors	Cadillac	Tennessee	Spring Hill Plant	Lyriq	43% ▲ (2026)
General Motors	Cadillac	Tennessee	Spring Hill Plant	Vistiq	43%
General Motors	Cadillac	Tennessee	Spring Hill Plant	XT5	31%
General Motors	Cadillac	Tennessee	Spring Hill Plant	XT6	31%
General Motors	Chevrolet	Kansas	Fairfax Assembly Plant	Bolt	N/A
General Motors	Chevrolet	Missouri	Wentzville Assembly Plant	Colorado	49% ▼
General Motors	Chevrolet	Kentucky	Bowling Green Assembly Plant	Corvette	39% ▲ (2026)
General Motors	Chevrolet	Missouri	Wentzville Assembly Plant	Express	53% ▼ (2026)
General Motors	Chevrolet	Michigan	Flint Truck Assembly Plant	Silverado	37%
General Motors	Chevrolet	Indiana	Fort Wayne Assembly Plant	Silverado	37%
General Motors	Chevrolet	Michigan	Factory ZERO Detroit/Hamtramck Assembly	Silverado EV	36%
General Motors	Chevrolet	Texas	Arlington Assembly Plant	Suburban	37%
General Motors	Chevrolet	Texas	Arlington Assembly Plant	Tahoe	37%
General Motors	Chevrolet	Michigan	Lansing Delta Township Assembly Plant	Traverse	35% ▲
General Motors	GMC	Michigan	Lansing Delta Township Assembly Plant	Acadia	35% ▲ (2026)
General Motors	GMC	Missouri	Wentzville Assembly Plant	Canyon	49% ▼
General Motors	GMC	Michigan	Factory ZERO Detroit/Hamtramck Assembly	Hummer EV SUT	56% ▲ (2026)
General Motors	GMC	Michigan	Factory ZERO Detroit/Hamtramck Assembly	Hummer EV SUV	56% ▲ (2026)
General Motors	GMC	Missouri	Wentzville Assembly Plant	Savana	57% ▲
General Motors	GMC	Michigan	Flint Truck Assembly Plant	Sierra	38% ▲ (2026)
General Motors	GMC	Indiana	Fort Wayne Assembly Plant	Sierra	38% ▲ (2026)
General Motors	GMC	Texas	Arlington Assembly Plant	Yukon	37%
General Motors	GMC	Texas	Arlington Assembly Plant	Yukon XL	N/A
Honda	Acura	Ohio	Marysville Auto Plant	Integra	60%
Honda	Acura	Ohio	East Liberty Auto Plant	MDX	65%
Honda	Acura	Ohio	East Liberty Auto Plant	RDX	60% ▼
Honda	Acura	Ohio	Marysville Auto Plant	Accord	60% ▼
Honda	Honda	Ohio	Marysville Auto Plant	Accord	60% ▼
Honda	Honda	Ohio	Marysville Auto Plant	CR-V e:FCEV	25%
Honda	Honda	Ohio	East Liberty Auto Plant	CR-V	55%-60%
Honda	Honda	Indiana	Honda Manufacturing of Indiana	Civic Hatchback	50%-55% ▼
Honda	Honda	Indiana	Honda Manufacturing of Indiana	CR-V	55%-60% ▼
Honda	Honda	Alabama	Honda Manufacturing of Alabama	Odyssey	70%
Honda	Honda	Alabama	Honda Manufacturing of Alabama	Passport	70% ▼
Honda	Honda	Alabama	Honda Manufacturing of Alabama	Pilot	70%
Honda	Honda	Alabama	Honda Manufacturing of Alabama	Ridgeline	70%
Hyundai Motor Group	Genesis	Alabama	Hyundai Motor Manufacturing Alabama	Electrified GV70	17%
Hyundai Motor Group	Hyundai	Alabama	Hyundai Motor Manufacturing Alabama	Santa Fe	47% ▼
Hyundai Motor Group	Hyundai	Alabama	Hyundai Motor Manufacturing Alabama	Santa Cruz	60% ▲
Hyundai Motor Group	Hyundai	Alabama	Hyundai Motor Manufacturing Alabama	Tucson	55% ▲
Hyundai Motor Group	Hyundai	(Georgia (U.S. state)) Georgia	Hyundai Motor Group Metaplant America	Ioniq 5	29%
Hyundai Motor Group	Hyundai	(Georgia (U.S. state)) Georgia	Hyundai Motor Group Metaplant America	Ioniq 9	N/A
Hyundai Motor Group	Kia	(Georgia (U.S. state)) Georgia	Kia Motors Manufacturing Georgia	EV6	80%
Hyundai Motor Group	Kia	(Georgia (U.S. state)) Georgia	Kia Motors Manufacturing Georgia	EV9	30%-60%
Hyundai Motor Group	Kia	(Georgia (U.S. state)) Georgia	Kia Motors Manufacturing Georgia	Sorento	55% ▼
Hyundai Motor Group	Kia	(Georgia (U.S. state)) Georgia	Kia Motors Manufacturing Georgia	Sportage	60% ▲
Hyundai Motor Group	Kia	(Georgia (U.S. state)) Georgia	Kia Motors Manufacturing Georgia	Telluride	60%
Lucid Motors	Lucid	Arizona	Lucid Motors Casa Grande, Arizona	Air	46% (2023)
Lucid Motors	Lucid	Arizona	Lucid Motors Casa Grande, Arizona	Gravity	53% (2026)
Mazda	Mazda	Alabama	Mazda Toyota Manufacturing USA	CX-50	60% ▲
Mercedes-Benz Group	Mercedes-Benz	Alabama	Mercedes-Benz U.S. International	EQE SUV	10%
Mercedes-Benz Group	Mercedes-Benz	Alabama	Mercedes-Benz U.S. International	EQS SUV	10%
Mercedes-Benz Group	Mercedes-Benz	Alabama	Mercedes-Benz U.S. International	GLE-Class	10%
Mercedes-Benz Group	Mercedes-Benz	Alabama	Mercedes-Benz U.S. International	GLS-Class	10%
Mercedes-Benz Group	Mercedes-Benz	South Carolina	Mercedes-Benz Vans, LLC	Sprinter	N/A
Nissan	Infiniti	Tennessee	Nissan North America, Inc. Smyrna	QX60	45%
Nissan	Infiniti	Tennessee	Nissan North America, Inc. Smyrna	QX65	N/A
Nissan	Nissan	Mississippi	Nissan North America, Inc. Canton	Altima	50%
Nissan	Nissan	Mississippi	Nissan North America, Inc. Canton	Frontier	40%
Nissan	Nissan	Tennessee	Nissan North America, Inc. Smyrna	Murano	45% ▼
Nissan	Nissan	Tennessee	Nissan North America, Inc. Smyrna	Pathfinder	50%
Nissan	Nissan	Tennessee	Nissan North America, Inc. Smyrna	Rogue	25%
Rivian	Rivian	Illinois	Normal, Illinois	R1T	N/A
Rivian	Rivian	Illinois	Normal, Illinois	R1S	N/A
Rivian	Rivian	Illinois	Normal, Illinois	EDV	N/A
Rivian	Rivian	Illinois	Normal, Illinois	R2	N/A
Stellantis	Dodge	Michigan	Jefferson North Assembly Plant	Durango	73% ▲
Stellantis	Jeep	Ohio	Toledo Assembly Complex	Gladiator	74% ▲
Stellantis	Jeep	Michigan	Jefferson North Assembly Plant	Grand Cherokee	71% ▲
Stellantis	Jeep	Michigan	Mack Avenue Engine Complex (2021)	Grand Cherokee	71%
Stellantis	Jeep	Michigan	Warren Truck Assembly Plant	Grand Wagoneer	62%▲
Stellantis	Jeep	Michigan	Warren Truck Assembly Plant	Wagoneer	62% ▲
Stellantis	Jeep	Ohio	Toledo Assembly Complex	Wrangler	68% ▲
Stellantis	Ram	Michigan	Warren Truck Assembly Plant	1500	55% ▼
Subaru Corporation	Subaru	Indiana	Subaru of Indiana Automotive	Ascent	45%
Subaru Corporation	Subaru	Indiana	Subaru of Indiana Automotive	Crosstrek	45%
Subaru Corporation	Subaru	Indiana	Subaru of Indiana Automotive	Forester	50%
Tesla, Inc.	Tesla	California	Tesla Factory	Model 3	70%-75%▲
Tesla, Inc.	Tesla	Texas	Gigafactory Texas	Model 3	70%-75%▲
Tesla, Inc.	Tesla	California	Tesla Factory	Model Y	70%
Tesla, Inc.	Tesla	Texas	Gigafactory Texas	Model Y	70%
Tesla, Inc.	Tesla	Texas	Gigafactory Texas	Cybercab	N/A
Tesla, Inc.	Tesla	Texas	Gigafactory Texas	Cybertruck	65%
Toyota	Lexus	Indiana	Toyota Motor Manufacturing Indiana	TX	25%-65% ▼
Toyota	Toyota	Kentucky	Toyota Motor Manufacturing Kentucky	Camry	55% ▼
Toyota	Toyota	Mississippi	Toyota Motor Manufacturing Mississippi	Corolla	55%
Toyota	Toyota	Alabama	Mazda Toyota Manufacturing USA	Corolla Cross	50%-60% ▲
Toyota	Toyota	Indiana	Toyota Motor Manufacturing Indiana	Highlander	60%-65% ▲
Toyota	Toyota	Indiana	Toyota Motor Manufacturing Indiana	Grand Highlander	60%-65%
Toyota	Toyota	Kentucky	Toyota Motor Manufacturing Kentucky	RAV4 Hybrid	45% (2024)
Toyota	Toyota	Texas	Toyota Motor Manufacturing Texas	Sequoia	50%
Toyota	Toyota	Indiana	Toyota Motor Manufacturing Indiana	Sienna	60%
Toyota	Toyota	Texas	Toyota Motor Manufacturing Texas	Tundra	50%-55%
Volkswagen Group	Volkswagen	Tennessee	Volkswagen Chattanooga Assembly Plant	Atlas	59%-60% ▲
Volkswagen Group	Volkswagen	Tennessee	Volkswagen Chattanooga Assembly Plant	Atlas Cross Sport	56%-58%

== Vehicles planned for future U.S. production ==
Model	Calendar year	Planned production location	Reason
Aptera	2026	Carlsbad, California	New vehicle
Buick Envision	2028	Kansas City, Kansas	Production moving from China
Chevrolet Equinox	2027	Kansas City, Kansas	Production moving from Mexico
DeLorean Alpha5	2026	San Antonio, Texas	New vehicle
Ford Fathom	2027	Louisville, Kentucky	New vehicle
Lexus TZ	2026	Georgetown, Kentucky	New vehicle
Mercedes-Benz GLC	2027	Tuscaloosa, Alabama	Production moving from Germany
Rivian R3	2028	Social Circle, Georgia	New vehicle
Scout Terra	2028	Blythewood, South Carolina	New vehicle
Scout Traveler	2028	Blythewood, South Carolina	New vehicle
Slate	2026	Warsaw, Indiana	New vehicle
Subaru Getaway	2026	Georgetown, Kentucky	New vehicle
Tesla Roadster	2028	Austin, Texas	New vehicle
Toyota Highlander BEV	2026	Georgetown, Kentucky	New vehicle

== See also ==
- Automotive industry in the United States
- List of countries by motor vehicle production
- List of automobile-related articles
