= List of DeSoto vehicles =

The following is a list of automobiles manufactured by the defunct DeSoto division of the Chrysler Corporation, indexed chronologically by year of introduction.

== Models ==
- DeSoto Series K-SA (1929–1932)
- Desoto Series SC-SD (1933–1934)
- DeSoto Airflow (1934–1936)
- DeSoto Airstream (1935–1936)
- DeSoto Series S (1937–1942) (S-1 through S-10, except the Airstream and Airflow)
- DeSoto Custom (1946–1952)
- DeSoto Deluxe (1946–1952)
- DeSoto Diplomat (1946-1961)
- DeSoto Firedome (1952–1959)
- DeSoto Powermaster (1953–1954)
- DeSoto Fireflite (1955–1960)
- DeSoto Adventurer (1956–1960)
- DeSoto Firesweep (1957–1959)

== See also ==
- DeSoto
- List of automobiles
