= List of Geo vehicles =

The American automobile manufacturer General Motors manufactured vehicles under its former marque Geo, a joint venture between GM and various Japanese automakers. Vehicles were sold under the Geo marque between 1989 and 1997.

== Model history ==
Production	Model	Class	Image
1989–1997	Geo Metro	Supermini/Subcompact car	
1989	Geo Spectrum	Subcompact car	
1989–1997	Geo Prizm	Subcompact car/Compact car	
1990–1993	Geo Storm	Sport compact	
1989–1997	Geo Tracker	Mini SUV	

== See also ==
- List of automobiles
