= List of Saab passenger cars =

The following is a list of Saab passenger cars indexed by year of introduction.

== Model history ==
Production	Model	Class	Image
=== 1940s ===
1949–1956	92	Small family car	
=== 1950s ===
1956–1959	93/GT750	Small family car	
1956–1957	94 Sonett	Sports car	
1959–1978	95	Station wagon	
=== 1960s ===
1960–1980	96/Sport	Small family car	
1966–1969	Sonett II	Sports car	
1968–1984	99	Compact executive car/Large family car	
=== 1970s ===
1970–1974	Sonett III	Sports car	
1978–1994	900	Compact executive car/Large family car	
=== 1980s ===
1980–1986	600	Small family car	
1984–1987	90	Small family car	
1984–1998	9000	Executive car	
=== 1990s ===
1994–2002	900/9-3	Compact executive/Medium family car	
1997–2010	9-5	Executive/Large family car	
=== 2000s ===
2002–2014	9-3	Compact executive/Medium family car	
2004–2005	9-2X	Compact/Small family car	
2005–2009	9-7X	Mid-size SUV	
=== 2010s ===
2010–2012	9-5	Executive/Large family car	
2011–2012	9-4X	Compact crossover SUV	

== See also ==
- List of automobiles
