= Dongfeng Fengguang S560 =

Compact crossover SUV

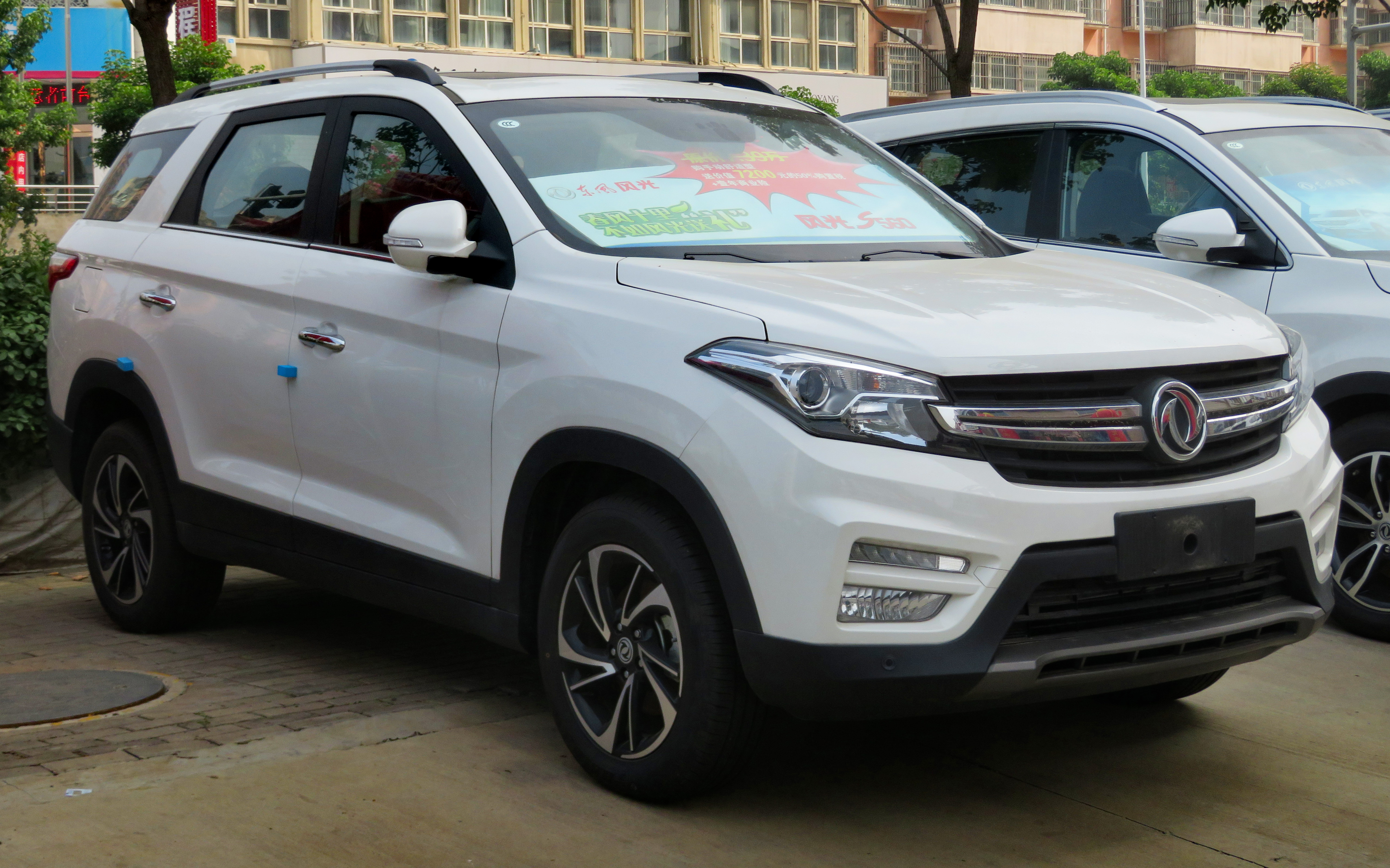
- 2018 Dongfeng Fengguang S560

Overview
- Manufacturer: Dongfeng Xiaokang (DFSK)
- Also called: DFSK Glory 560 (global)
- Production: 2017–present
- Model years: 2018–present
- Assembly: China: Chongqing (DFSK); Indonesia: Serang, Banten (Sokonindo Automobile)

Body and chassis
- Class: Compact crossover SUV
- Body style: 5-door SUV
- Layout: Front-engine, front-wheel-drive

Powertrain
- Engine: 1.5 L SFG I4-T (petrol); 1.8 L SFG I4 (petrol)
- Transmission: 6-speed manual; CVT

Dimensions
- Wheelbase: 2,690 mm (105.9 in)
- Length: 4,515 mm (177.8 in)
- Width: 1,815 mm (71.5 in)
- Height: 1,735 mm (68.3 in)
- Curb weight: 1,440–1,480 kg (3,170–3,260 lb)

The Dongfeng Fengguang S560 (Chinese: 东风风光S560) is a compact crossover SUV manufactured by the Chinese automaker Dongfeng Motor Co., Ltd., under the Dongfeng Sokon (DFSK) sub-brand since 2017. The S560 is positioned below the larger Fengguang 580.

As of 2019, the Fengguang S560 has been sold in China, Indonesia, and some South American markets.

== Overview ==
The Fengguang S560 was launched in November 2017 in China with prices ranging from 63,900 yuan to 96,900 yuan.

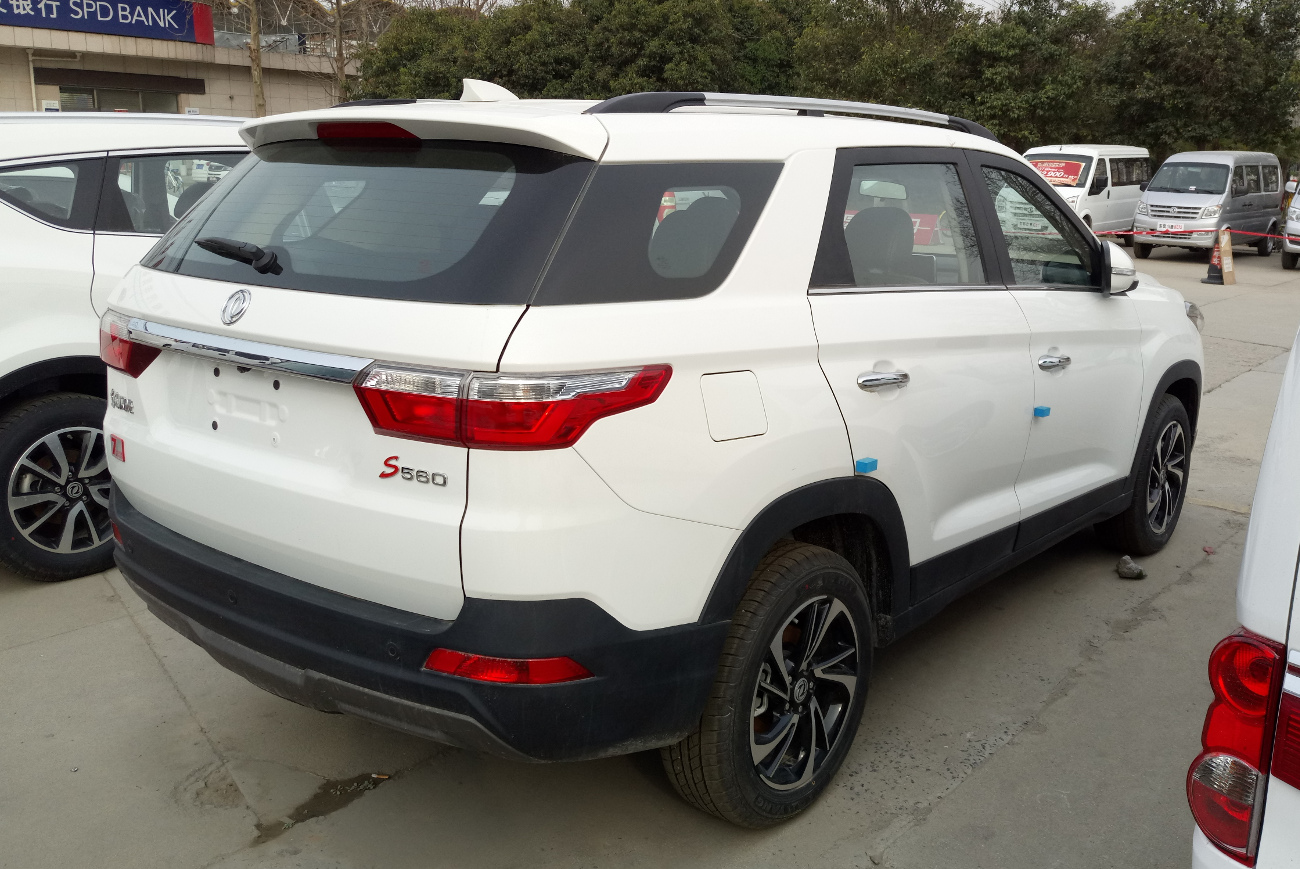
Fengguang S560 (rearview)

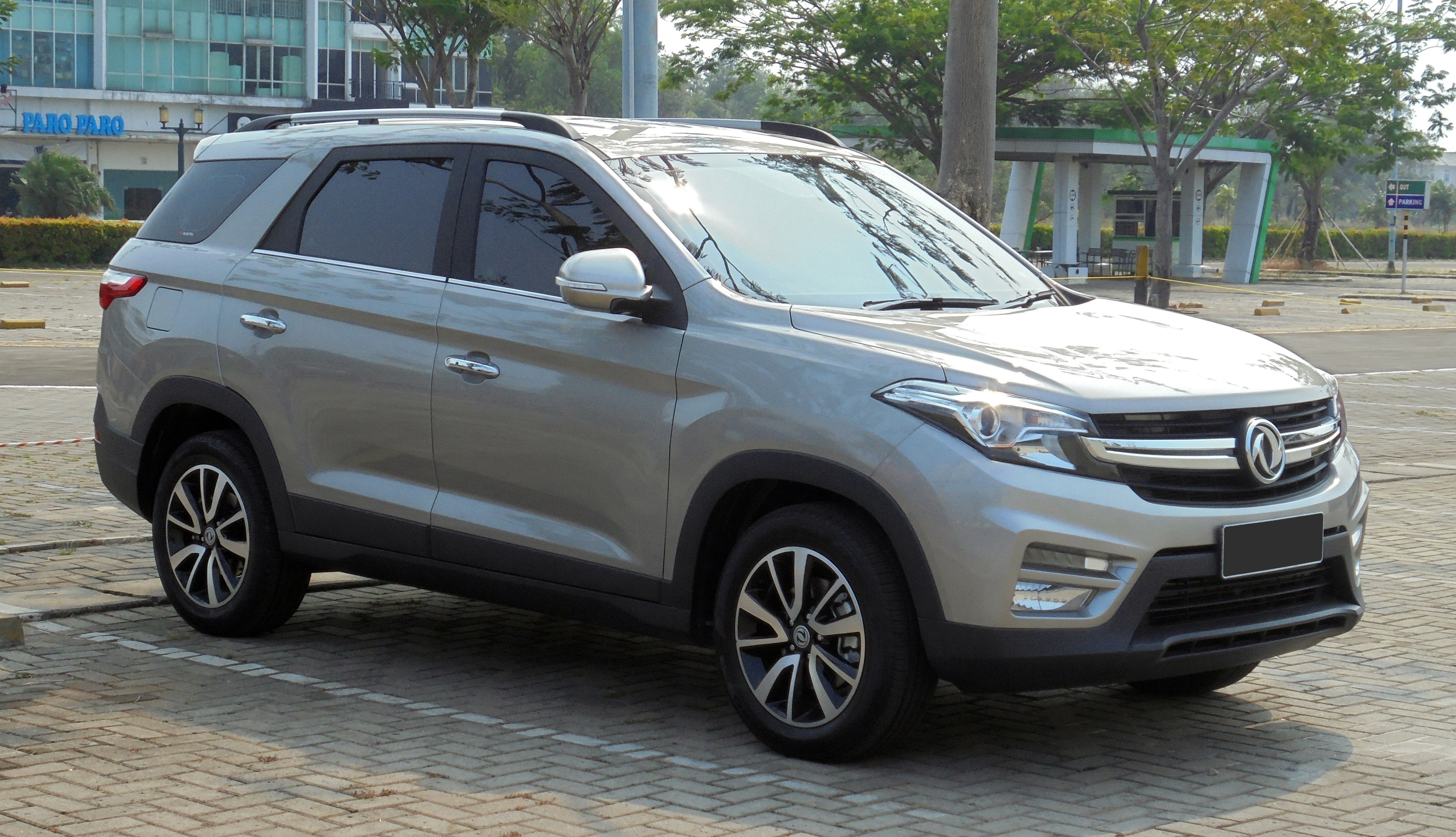
2019 DFSK Glory 560 (Indonesia)

=== Indonesia ===
In Indonesia, the Fengguang S560 is sold as the DFSK Glory 560, which was revealed on 26 March 2019 and launched at the 27th Indonesia International Motor Show on 25 April 2019. The Glory 560 is available in three trim levels: B-Type, C-Type and L-Type. The B-Type and C-Type are only available with manual transmission, while the L-Type is available either manual or CVT transmission. Most trims levels are powered by 1.5-litre SFG15T turbocharged four-cylinder engine taken from the Glory 580 producing 147.5 hp (110 kW) at 5600 rpm, while the 1.8-litre SFG18 naturally-aspirated four-cylinder engine producing 137 hp (102 kW) at 6000 rpm is only available on the L-Type. For seating configurations, the B-Type is only available as a 5-seater, while the rest of the trim levels are only available as a 7-seater, configured in 2-3-2 layout. All trim equipped with front and rear disk brakes, fog lamps, electronic power steering, roof rails, keyless entry and push start button, remote windows, front airbags, electric mirrors, ABS with EBD, electronic park brakes, child lock, speed sensitive auto lock, crash auto unlocked, alarm systems, touch screen head unit, soft panel dashboard, leather steering wheel, multi information display, six-way adjustable driver seats.

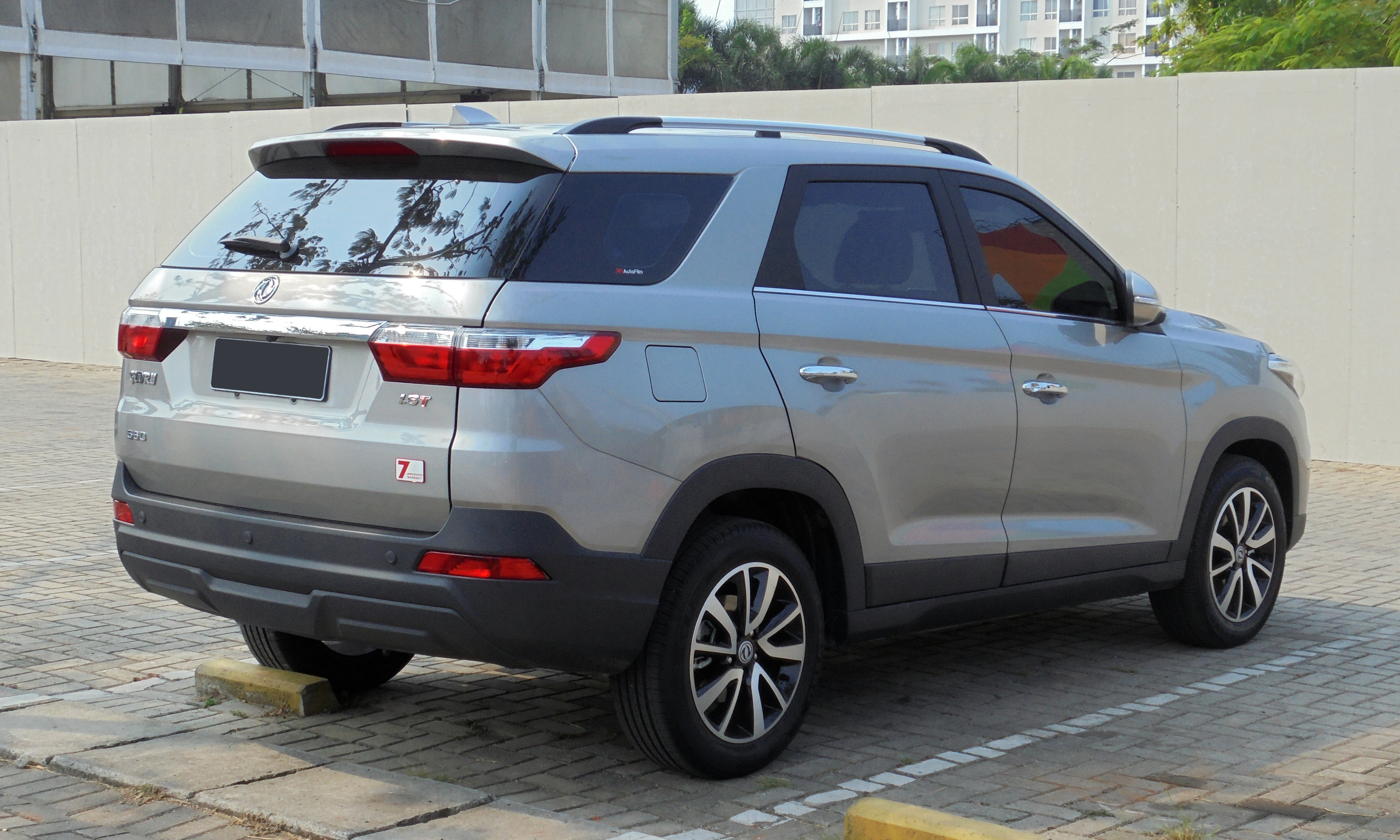
2019 DFSK Glory 560 (Indonesia)

=== Brunei ===
In Brunei, the DFSK Glory 560 was launched on 17 September 2020. The Glory 560 for the Brunei market is imported from Indonesia. It is powered by a 1.5-litre turbocharged petrol engine mated to a CVT and 7-seater becomes standard.

=== Thailand ===
In Thailand, the DFSK Glory 560 was revealed on 24 January 2022. The DFSK Glory 560 for the Thai market will be imported from Indonesia.

== Sales ==
Year	China
2022	14,171
2023	5,346
2024	3,778
