= List of Rivian vehicles =

Rivian is an electric car company that has been selling vehicles since 2021. This is a list of their production and prototype vehicles.

== Production vehicles ==
Model	Calendar year unveiled	Current model		Vehicle description
Model	Calendar year unveiled	Introduction	Update/facelift	Vehicle description
Pickup Truck
R1T	2018	2021	2025	Electric Pickup Truck Gen 1 (2021-2023) Gen 2 (2024-Present)
SUVs
R1S	2018	2022	2025	Electric SUV Gen 1 (2021-2023) Gen 2 (2024-Present)
R2	2024	2026	-	Electric Mid-size SUV
R3	2024	2028	-	Small Electric SUV
R3X	2024	2028	-	Off-Road Capable version of the R3
Delivery Van
EDV	2020	2021	-	Electric Delivery Van primarily used by Amazon.

== Others ==
=== Prototypes ===
Sports Car, 2009-2011
R1T Concept, 2018
R1S Concept, 2018
