= List of Iran Khodro vehicles =

Iran Khodro currently lists the following automobiles and trucks.

== Iran Khodro ==
- Tara
- Dena
- Dena +
- Runna +
- Arisun 2
- Soren +

== Peugeot Co-Products ==
- 207i
- 206
- Pars
