= List of Infiniti vehicles =

Infiniti, the luxury marque of Japanese automotive manufacturer Nissan, has manufactured a number of vehicles since its inception in 1989.

== Current models ==
Model	Model name introduced	Current generation model		Former Name	Vehicle description
Model	Model name introduced	Introduction	Update/facelift	Former Name	Vehicle description
Crossover SUVs
QX60	2014	2022	2025	JX	Three-row mid-size luxury crossover SUV that shares its platform with the Nissan Pathfinder.
QX65	2026	2026	–	–	Coupe-style version of the QX60 with a sloping rear roofline.
Body-on-frame SUVs
QX80	2014	2024	–	QX56; QX	Full-size luxury SUV that shares its platform with the Nissan Patrol/Nissan Armada.

== Former models ==
Image	Name	Vehicle type	Chronology				Related
Image	Name	Vehicle type	Pred.	Suc.	Intro.	Disc.	Related
	QX50	SUV	EX-series	-	2013	2025	
	QX55	SUV	QX70	-	2021	2025	
	Q50	Sedan	G-Series Sedan	-	2013	2024	Nissan Skyline
	Q60	Coupe	G-Series Coupe	-	2013	2022	Nissan 350Z; Nissan 370Z
	ESQ	SUV	-	-	2014	2019	Nissan Juke
	Q30	Hatchback	-	-	2016	2019	Mercedes-Benz A-Class
	QX30	Crossover	-	-	2016	2019	Mercedes-Benz GLA-Class
	Q70	Sedan	M-series	-	2013	2019	Nissan Cima Nissan Fuga
	QX70	SUV	FX-series	QX65	2013	2017	
	EX-series	SUV	-	QX50	2007	2013	Nissan Skyline Crossover
	FX-series	SUV	-	QX70	2002	2013	
	JX-series	SUV	-	QX60	2012	2013	Nissan Pathfinder
	QX56	SUV	QX4	QX80	2004	2013	Nissan Titan Nissan Patrol
	G-series	Sedan; Coupe Cabriolet	-	Q40; Q50; Q60	1990	2013	Nissan 350Z; Nissan 370Z; Nissan Skyline
	M-series	Sedan	-	Q70	1989	2013	Nissan Fuga
	Q45	Sedan	-	M35; M45	1989	2006	Nissan Cima Nissan President
	QX4	SUV	-	QX56; FX; JX	1996	2002	Nissan Pathfinder
	I-series	Sedan	J30	-	1995	2002	Nissan Cefiro Nissan Maxima
	J-series	Sedan	-	I30	1992	1997	Nissan Leopard

== See also ==
- Infiniti, the brand under which these vehicles are sold
- List of Nissan vehicles, for a complete list of cars and trucks the Nissan group sells
