= Fengon ix7 =

Midsize SUV produced by DFSK Motor

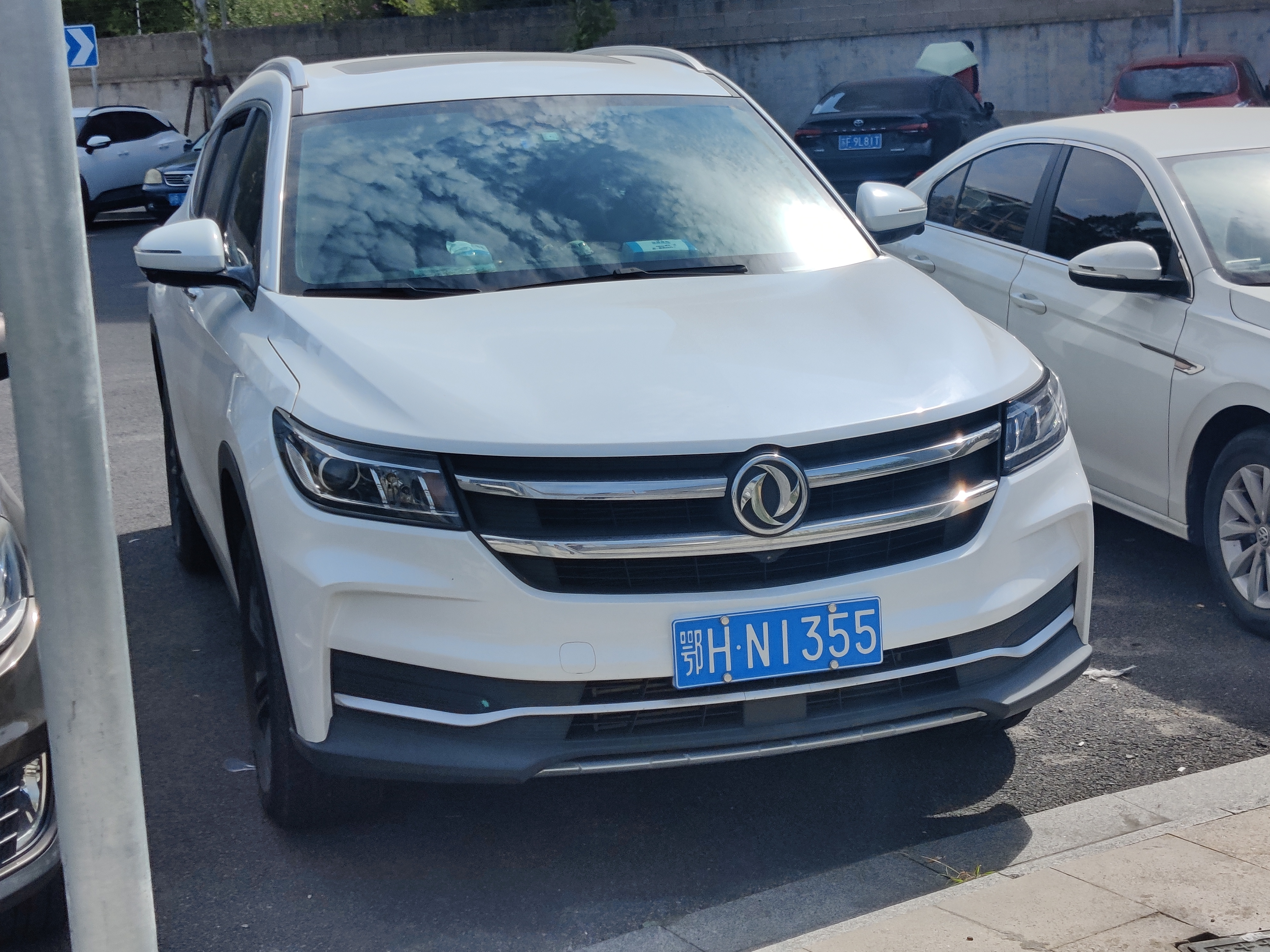
- Fengon iX7 (China)

Overview
- Manufacturer: DFSK Motor
- Also called: DFSK Glory ix7; DFSK Fengon 7 (Europe); DFSK Fengon iX7 (UAE)
- Production: 2019–present
- Model years: 2020–present
- Assembly: China: Chongqing; Iran: Tehran

Body and chassis
- Class: Mid-size crossover SUV
- Body style: 5-door SUV
- Layout: Front-engine, four-wheel-drive
- Related: Fengon ix5; AITO M7

Powertrain
- Engine: 2.0 L GDI I4-T (petrol)
- Transmission: 6-speed automatic

Dimensions
- Wheelbase: 2,810 mm (110.6 in)
- Length: 4,930 mm (194.1 in)
- Width: 1,935 mm (76.2 in)
- Height: 1,765 mm (69.5 in)

The Fengon ix7 is an SUV sold under the Fengon brand produced from 2019 by Chinese car manufacturer DFSK Motor, a joint venture between Dongfeng Motor and Sokon Group. In export markets it is sold as DFSK Glory ix7, DFSK Fengon 7 in Belgium and DFSK Fengon iX7 in the United Arab Emirates.

== History ==
Presented at the Chengdu show in November 2019, the Fengon ix7 (codenamed "F517") is the flagship model of the DFSK range. Originally called the Fengon (Fengguang) 580 MAX before launch, the Fengon ix7 is based on the Fengon 580 Pro and could be seen as a more upmarket variant.

The mechanics of the ix7 are derived from that of the more compact ix5 but with a longer wheelbase and widened track, and is designed together with the BorgWarner to be able to also adopt all-wheel drive. Aesthetically, the car has the same stylistic family feeling adopted by the more compact ix5 but with the bodywork typical of seven-seater SUVs, the front characterized by the large grille (chromed or with black strips) that extends from the hood to the bumpers and headlights integrate an LED. In the tail there is the lights connected in a single piece along the entire trunk.

The interior features fully functional instrumentation combined with the 10.5-inch touchscreen multimedia system and climate controls, also touchscreen with a 9-inch display. The passenger compartment has seven seats with the third row foldable into the floor.

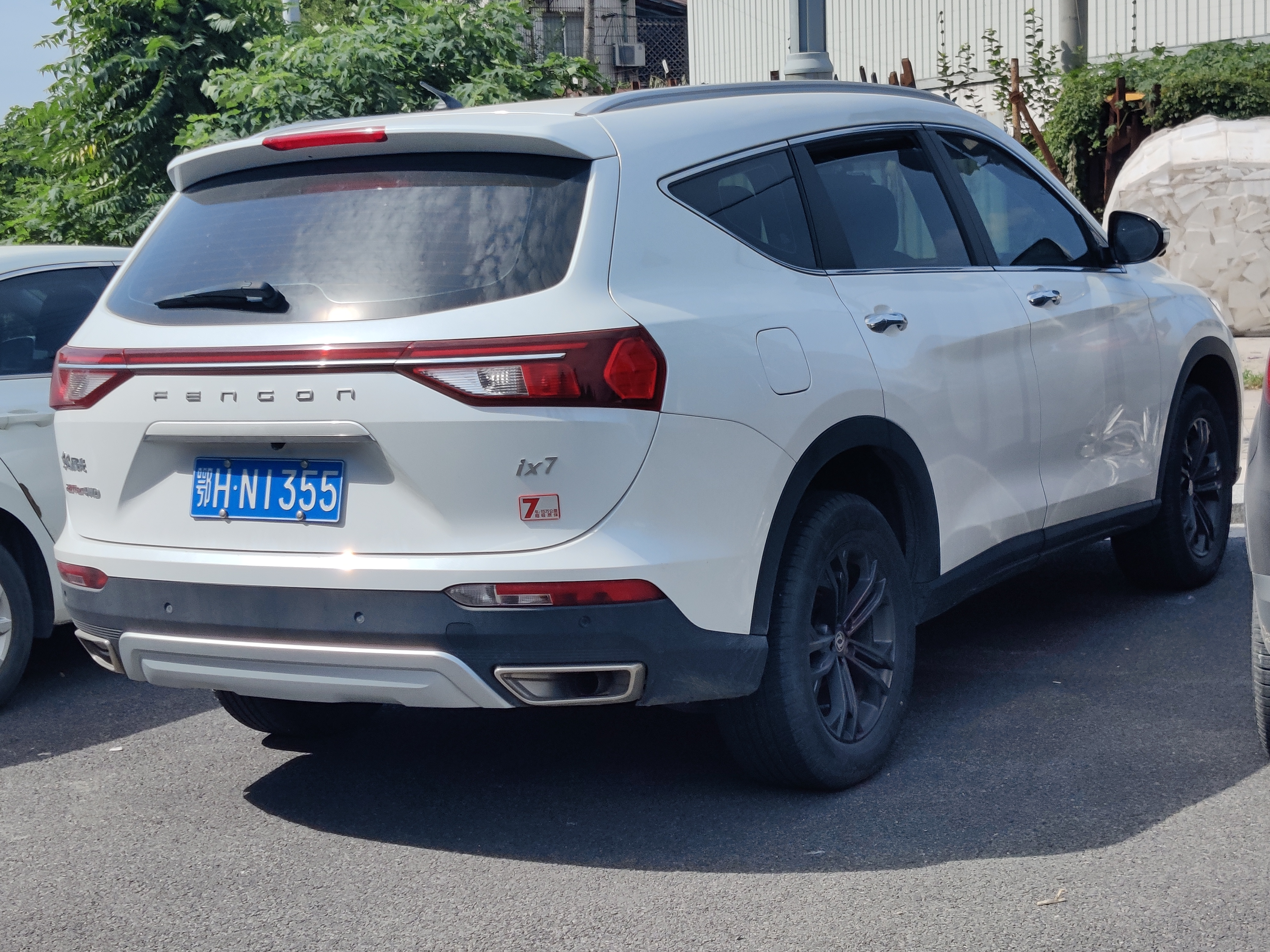
Rear view

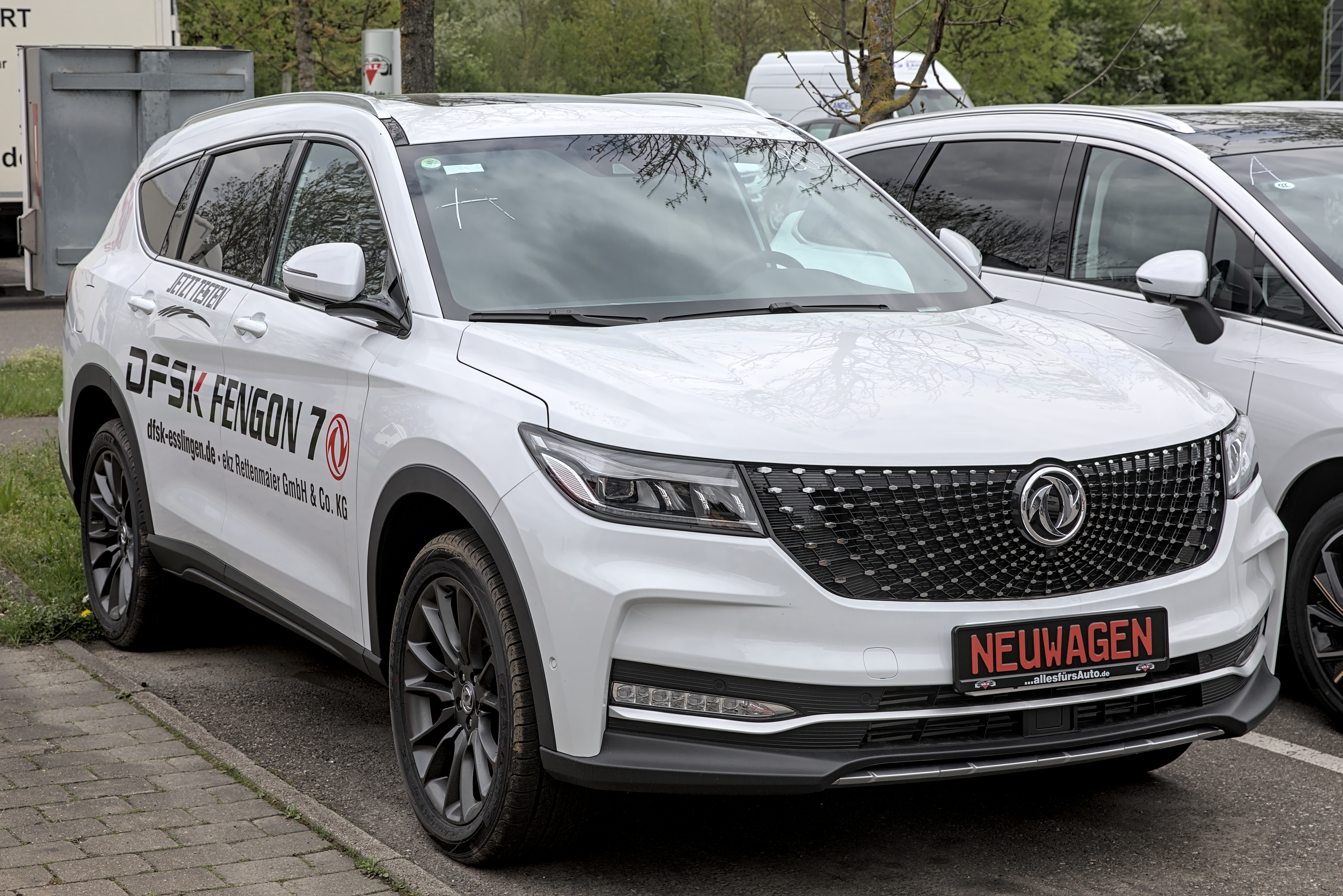
DFSK Fengon 7 (Europe)

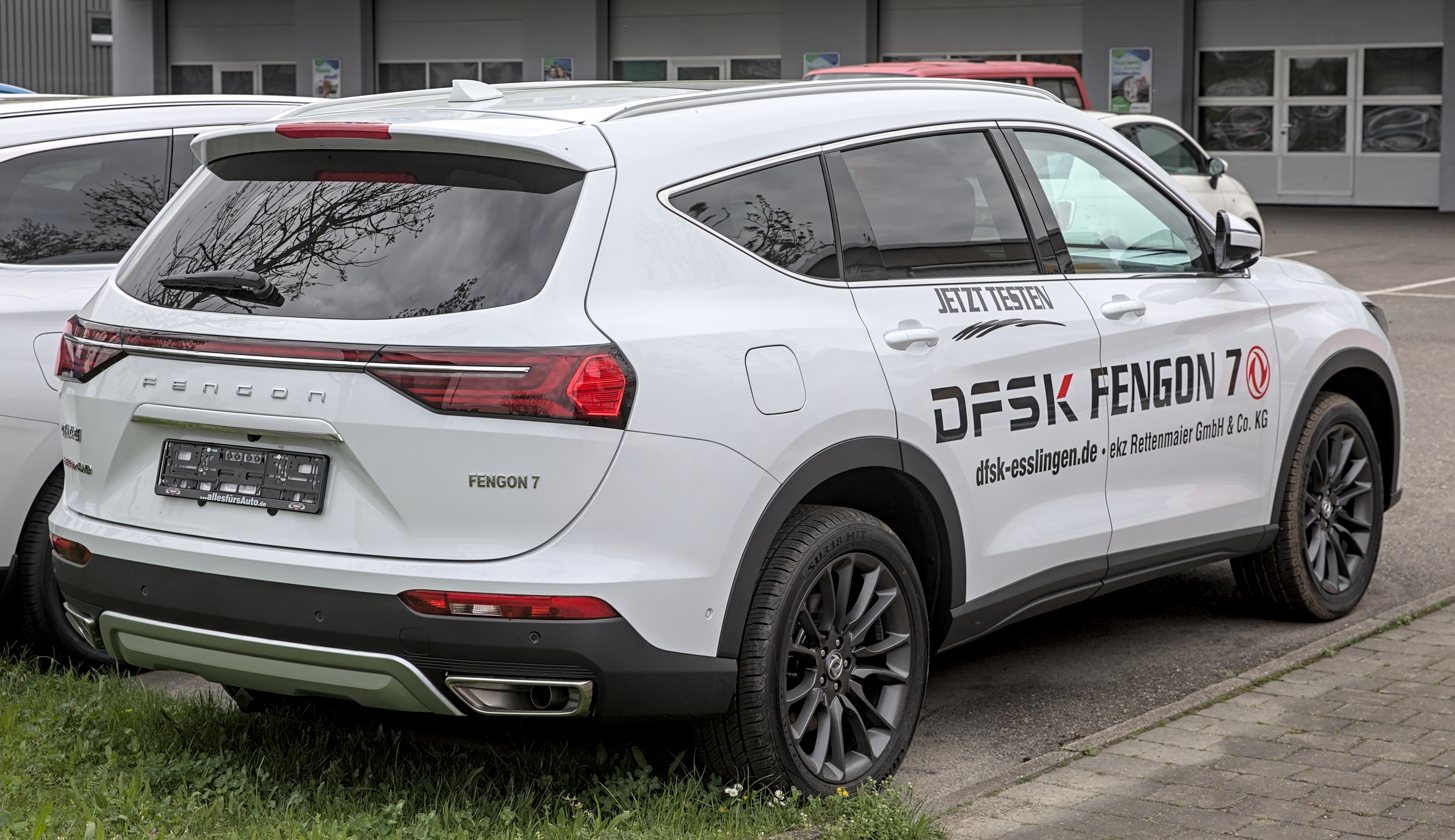
Fengon 7 rear (Europe)

== Mechanics ==
The ix7 shares the same platform as the Fengon 580. At 4.93 meters long, the ix7 shares several components as the smaller ix5 but adopts both the front and all-wheel drive developed by BorgWarner. The engine in front-transverse position. It has MacPherson independent front suspension and multilink independent rear suspension and stabilizer bar. The front brakes are ventilated discs and the rear are discs.

All models have six airbags, ABS and EBD, stability and traction control, automatic emergency braking, lane keeping and fatigue detector as standard.

The engine range consists of a single 2.0 GDI Turbo 16-valve four-cylinder petrol engine delivering 231 horsepower and 355 Nm of torque at 1,800 rpm combined with an Aisin 6-speed automatic transmission.
