= List of KGM vehicles =

The following is a list of KGM vehicles.

== Production models ==
Model			Current generation		Vehicle description
Image	Name	Introduction (cal. year)	Model code	Introduction	Vehicle description
SUV/crossover
	Actyon	2005	J120	2024	Mid-size crossover based on the KGM Torres.
	Korando	1983	C300	2019	Compact luxury crossover SUV. Formerly the SsangYong Korando.
	Korando e-Motion	2019	C300	2019	Battery electric crossover based on the Korando.
	Rexton	2001	Y400	2017	Mid-size luxury crossover SUV. Formerly the SsangYong Rexton.
	Tivoli	2015	X100	2015	Subcompact crossover SUV. Formerly the SsangYong Tivoli.
	Tivoli XLV	2016	X100	2015	Extended version of the Tivoli. Formerly the SsangYong Tivoli XLV.
	Torres	2022	J100	2022	Mid-size crossover SUV. Formerly the SsangYong Torres.
	Torres EVX	2022	U100	2023	Battery electric crossover based on the Torres.
Pickup truck
	Musso Pick-up	2002	Q300	2026	Mid-size pickup truck. Formerly the SsangYong Musso Pick-up.
	Musso EV	2025	O100	2025	Battery electric mid-size pickup truck.
