= Fengon 580 =

Chinese mid-size SUV

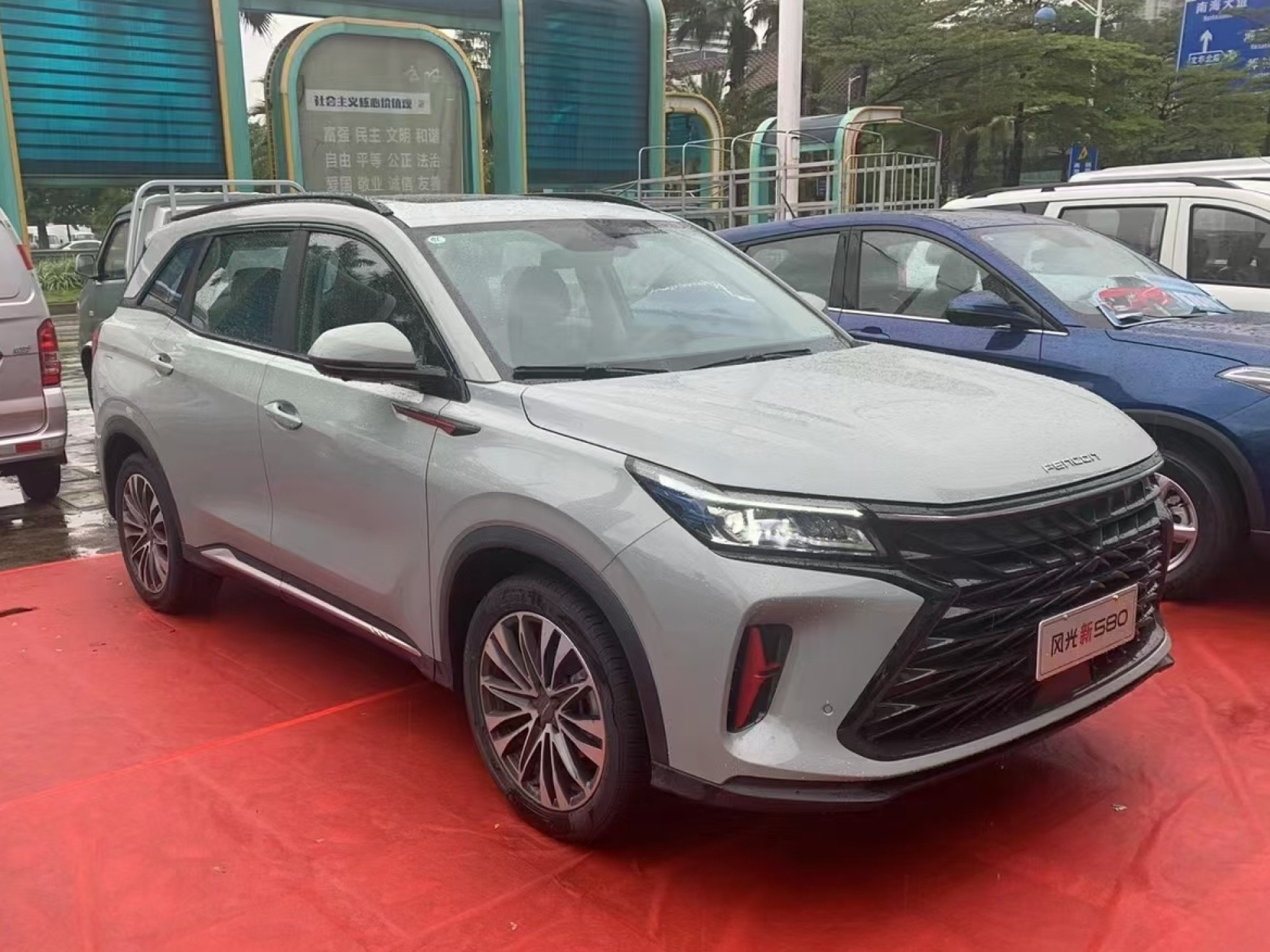

Overview
- Manufacturer: Seres Auto (Hubei)
- Production: 2016–present
- Model years: 2016–present

Body and chassis
- Class: Mid-size SUV
- Body style: 5-door crossover SUV
- Chassis: Unibody

The Fengon 580 is a series of mid-size SUV produced by the Chinese automaker Seres Auto (Hubei) since 2016.

The first generation was originally sold as the Dongfeng Fengguang 580 (Chinese: 东风风光580) by DFSK Motor, then a joint venture between Dongfeng Motor and Sokon, from 2016. It was also rebadged under several names that translate to Fengguang in Chinese, including Glory for overseas markets. It was renamed to Fengon 580 in later model years after Seres fully acquired DFSK Motor.

The second generation was launched in 2021. A plug-in hybrid and range-extender variant called the Landian E5 (Chinese: 蓝电E5) was launched in 2023.

== First generation (2016) ==
First generation
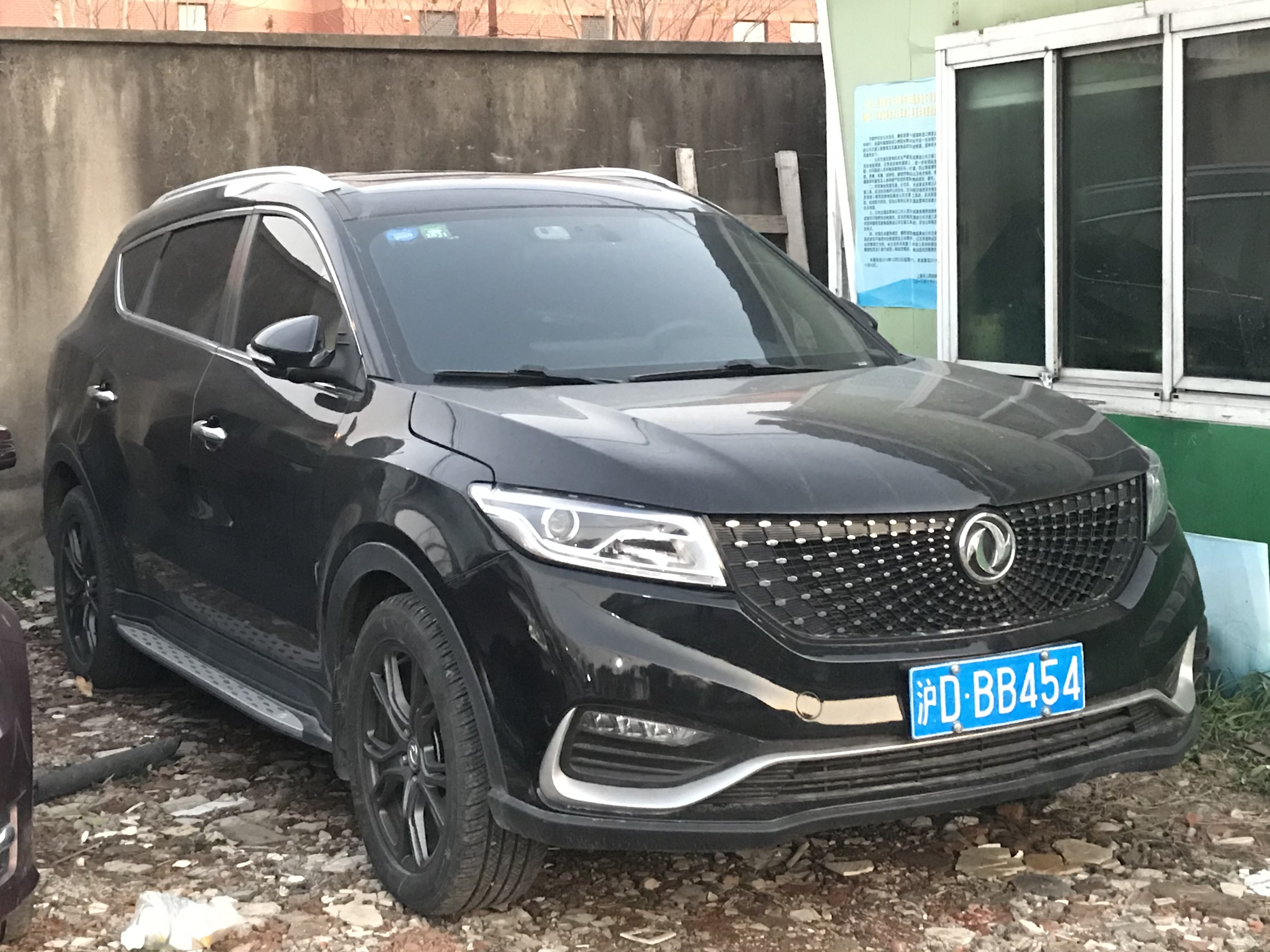

Overview
- Also called: DFSK Glory 580; DFSK Glory i-Auto (Indonesia); DFSK G7; DFSK SUV 580; DFSK 580; DFM 580 (Russia)
- Production: 2016–present
- Model years: 2016–present; 2019–present (580 Pro)
- Assembly: China: Chongqing; Indonesia: Serang, Banten (Sokonindo Automobile); Pakistan: Lahore (Regal Automobiles Prince DFSK)

Body and chassis
- Class: Mid-size SUV
- Body style: 5-door crossover SUV
- Layout: Front-engine, front-wheel-drive
- Related: Fengon ix7; Fengon ix5

Powertrain
- Engine: Petrol: 1.5 L HD15A I4 turbo; 1.5 L SFG15TA I4 turbo; 1.8 L SFG18A I4
- Transmission: 5-speed manual; 6-speed manual; CVT

Dimensions
- Wheelbase: 2,780 mm (109.4 in)
- Length: 4,680 mm (184.3 in)
- Width: 1,845 mm (72.6 in)
- Height: 1,715 mm (67.5 in)

The Fengon 580 originally debuted at the 2016 Beijing Auto Show in China and was launched to the Chinese market in June 2016.

At launch, it was powered by a single 1.5-litre SFG turbocharged four-cylinder engine. A 1.8-litre SFG naturally-aspirated four-cylinder engine was added later. Two transmission options were available: a 6-speed manual and a continuously variable transmission (CVT).

In Indonesia, the Fengon 580 is sold as the DFSK Glory 580 since 2018. It was first displayed at the 25th Gaikindo Indonesia International Auto Show in August 2017, with a media test drive held on 28 November 2017. It was showcased again at the 26th Indonesia International Motor Show in April 2018, with bookings opened at the same time. The Glory 580 was launched on 19 July 2018. The Glory 580 is available in two trim levels: Comfort and Luxury. The Comfort trim is available with either a 1.5-litre turbo or a 1.8-litre engine, while the Luxury trim is only available with the 1.5-litre turbo. Transmission options include a 5-speed manual (Comfort 1.8 only), a 6-speed manual, and a CVT. The Indonesian-spec DFSK Glory 580 is locally assembled at DFSK's Cikande facility in Serang Regency, Banten, and has been exported to other markets since 2018, including Bangladesh, Nepal, Sri Lanka, and Hong Kong. Due to falling demand, the Glory 580 was discontinued in Indonesia in late 2020 while export to other markets continued. For the Indonesian market, it was replaced by the Glory i-Auto.

In South Korea, the Fengon 580 was launched in 2018 as the DFSK G7, sold and distributed through DFSK's local distributor Shinwon CK Motors.

In Pakistan, the Fengon 580 was launched on 24 April 2019 as the DFSK Glory 580 under DFSK's local distributor Regal Automobiles Industries Limited.

The Fengon 580 was launched in Russia as the DFM 580, announced in late 2018 and going on sale on 8 May 2019. It was also launched as the Glory 580 in Bangladesh in late 2018, in Nepal on 28 March 2019, in Hong Kong on 24 October 2019, in Morocco on 21 February 2020, and in Brunei on 26 November 2020.

In the United Kingdom, the DFSK Glory 580 was imported in right-hand drive by Dorset-based distributor Sokon Automotive in 2020.

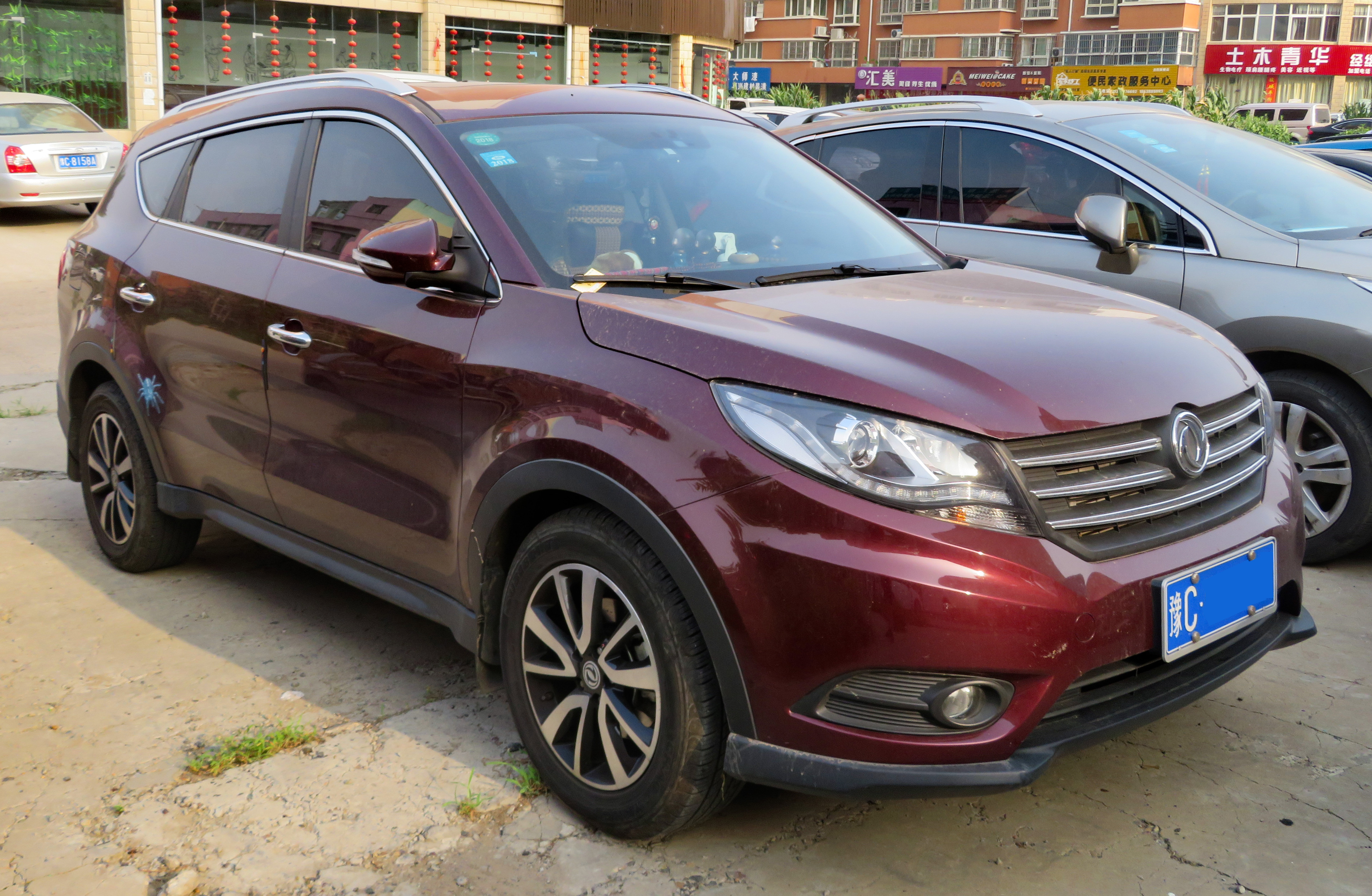
Fengon 580 (pre-facelift)

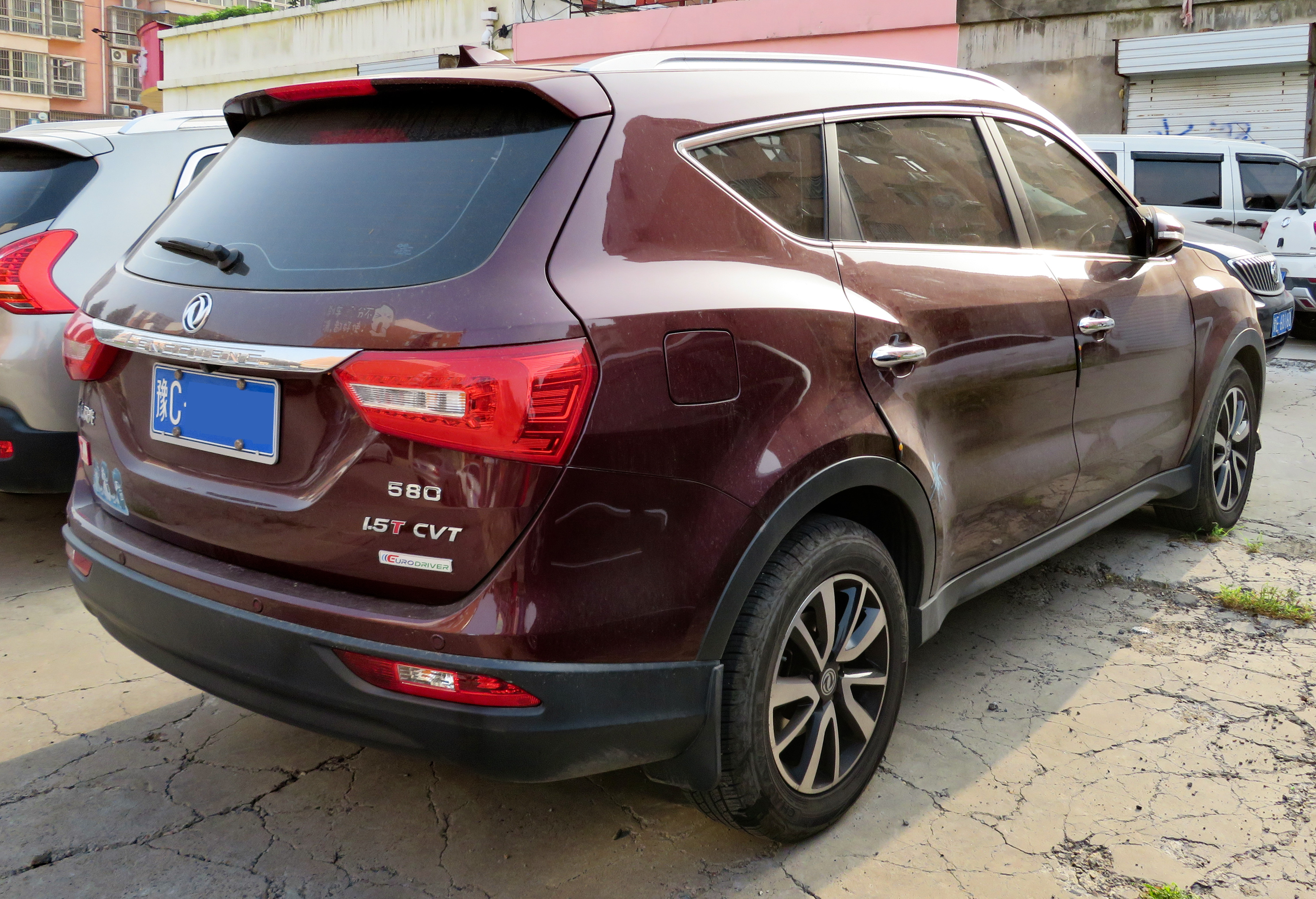
Rear view (pre-facelift)

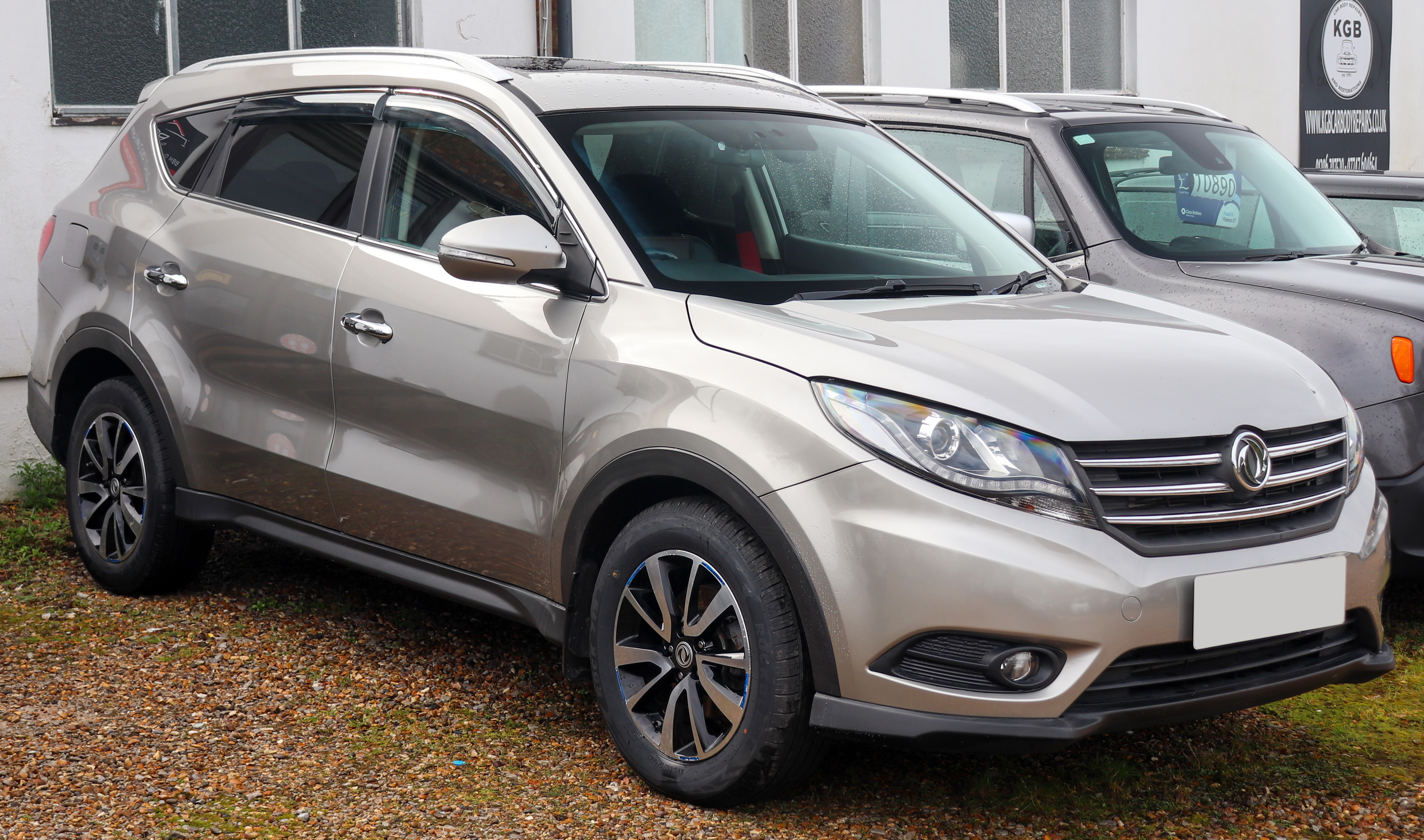
DFSK Glory 580 (United Kingdom)

The Fengon 580 received a facelift in 2018, with changes including redesigned front and rear bumpers, new wheel designs, redesigned rear taillights, and an updated interior.

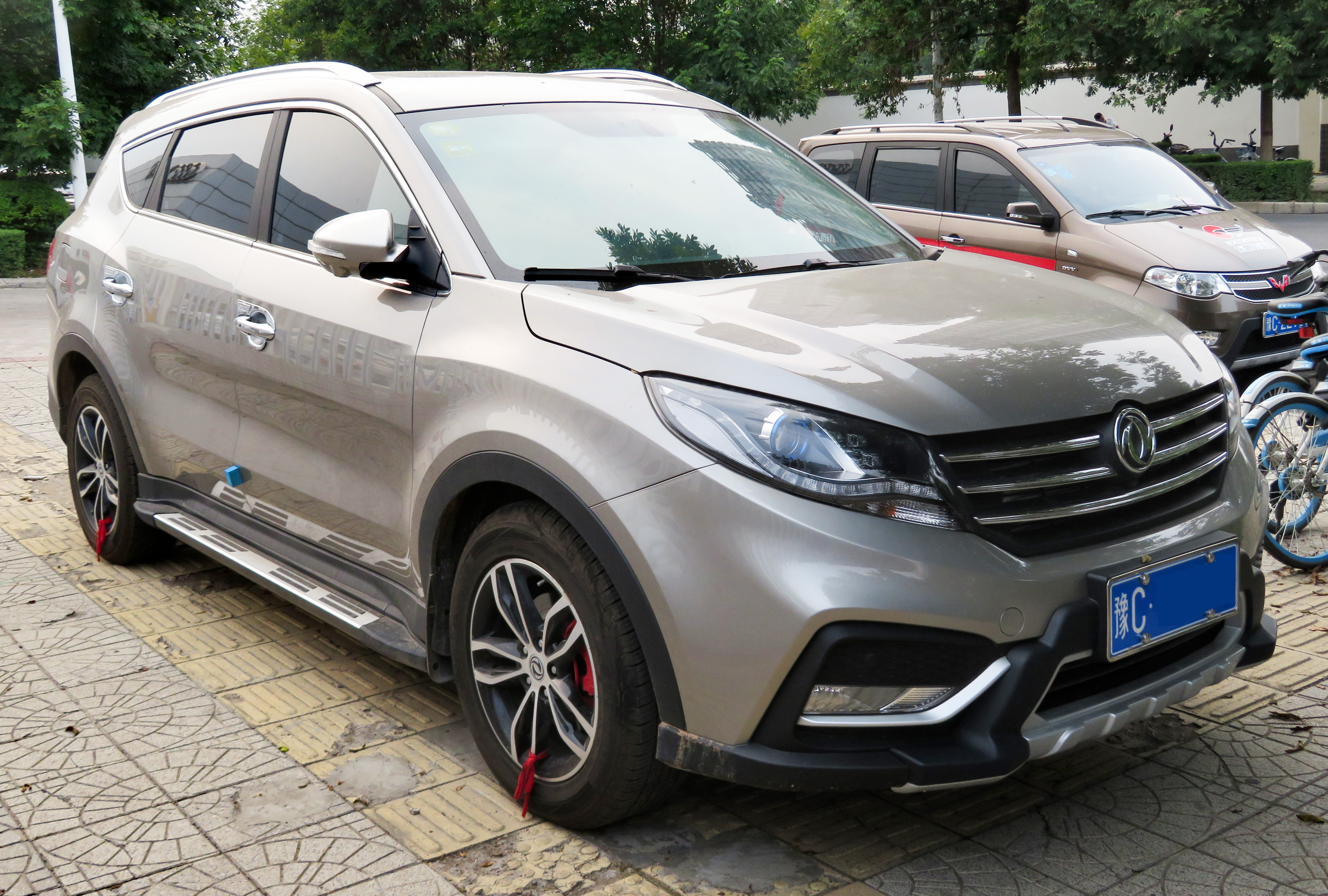
Fengon 580 (facelift)

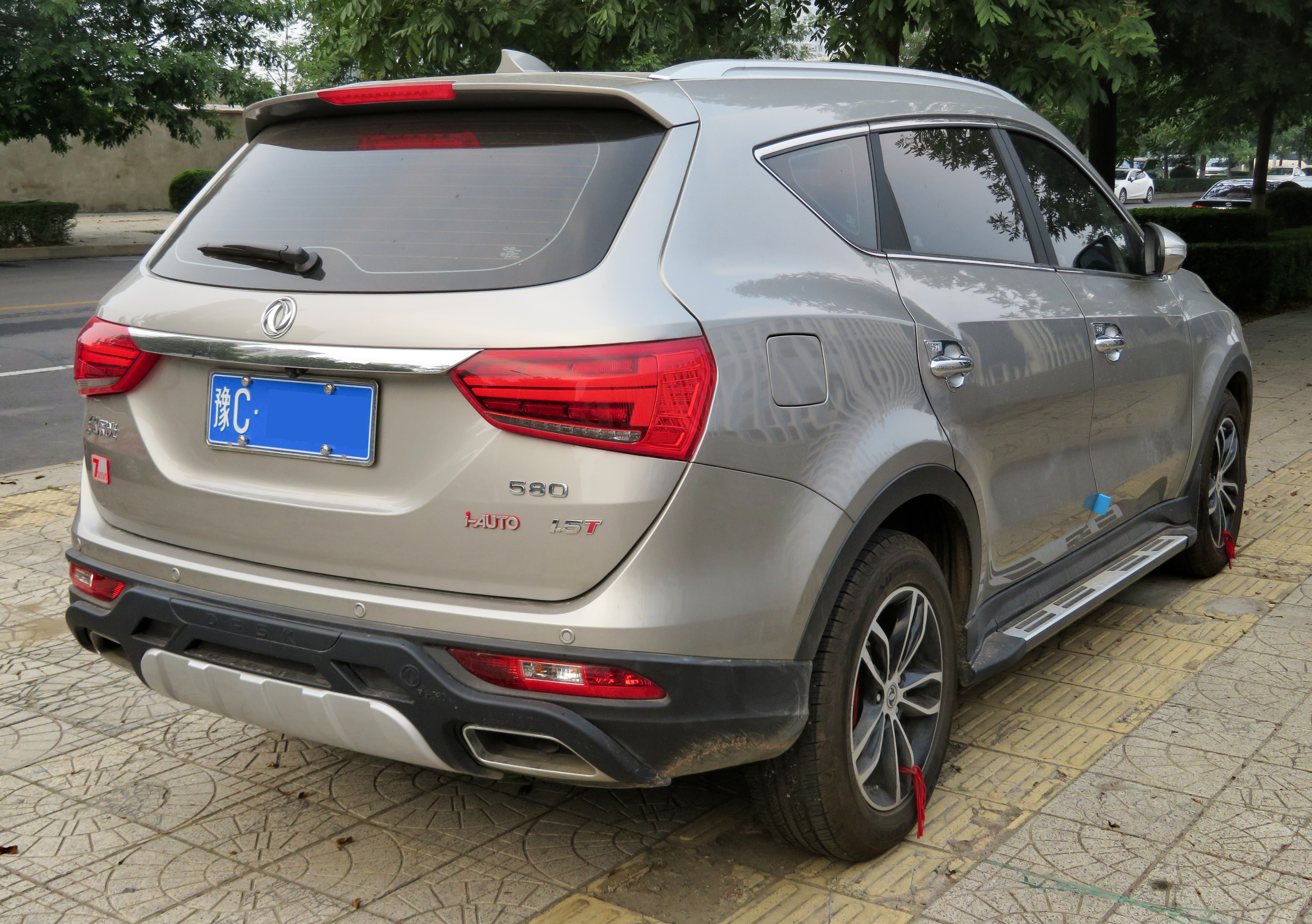
Rear view (facelift)

=== 580 Pro ===
The Fengon 580 Pro is the upmarket variant of the 580, initially only available on the Chinese market. It was first showcased at the 2019 Shanghai Auto Show and went on sale in China on 31 July 2019. The 580 Pro features a different front and rear fascia and is mated with a 6-speed automatic transmission.

The 580 Pro has also been sold in Pakistan since 2020 as the DFSK Glory 580 Pro, locally assembled in Lahore from knock-down kits.

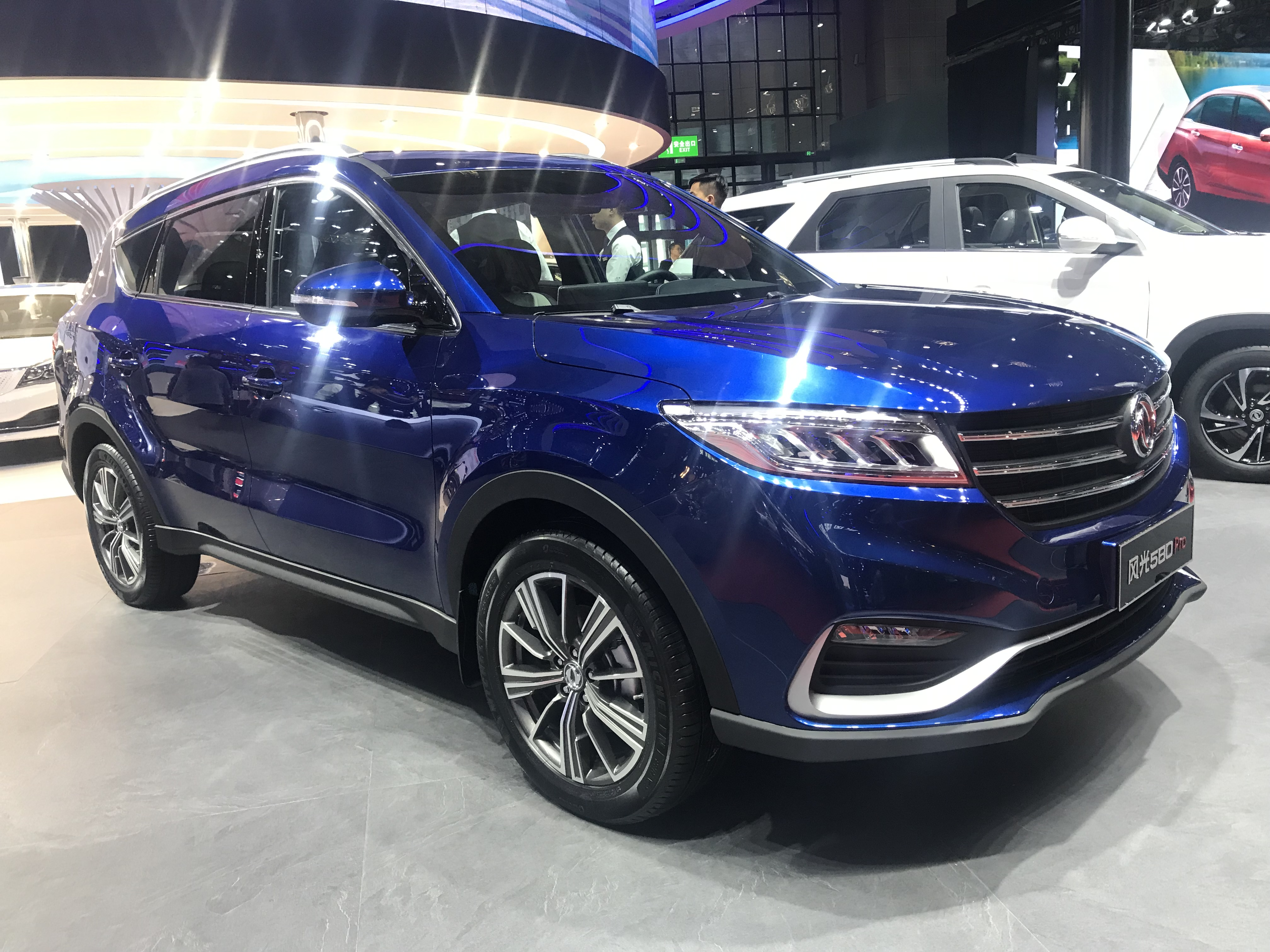
Fengon 580 Pro (2019)

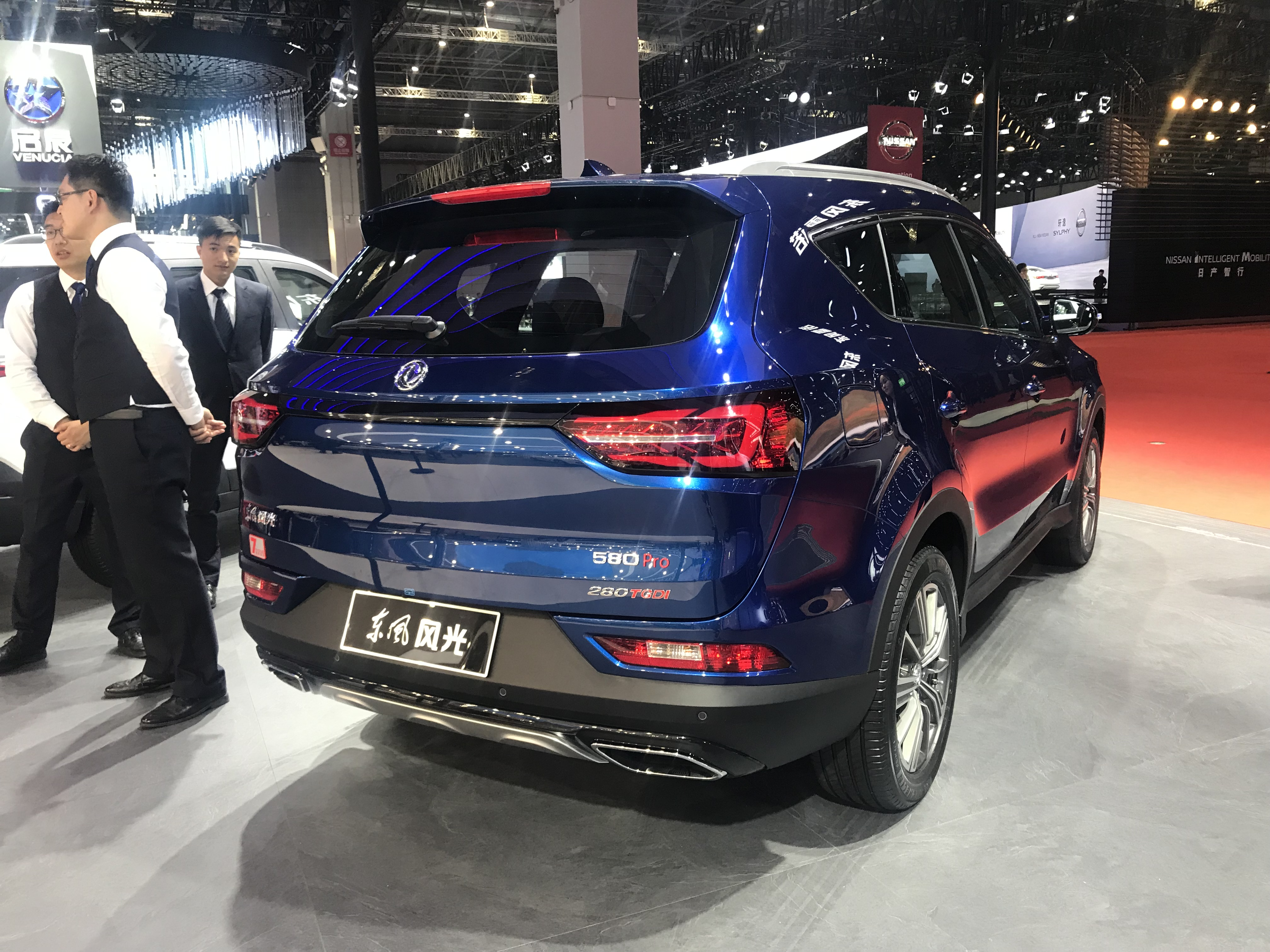
Rear view (2019)
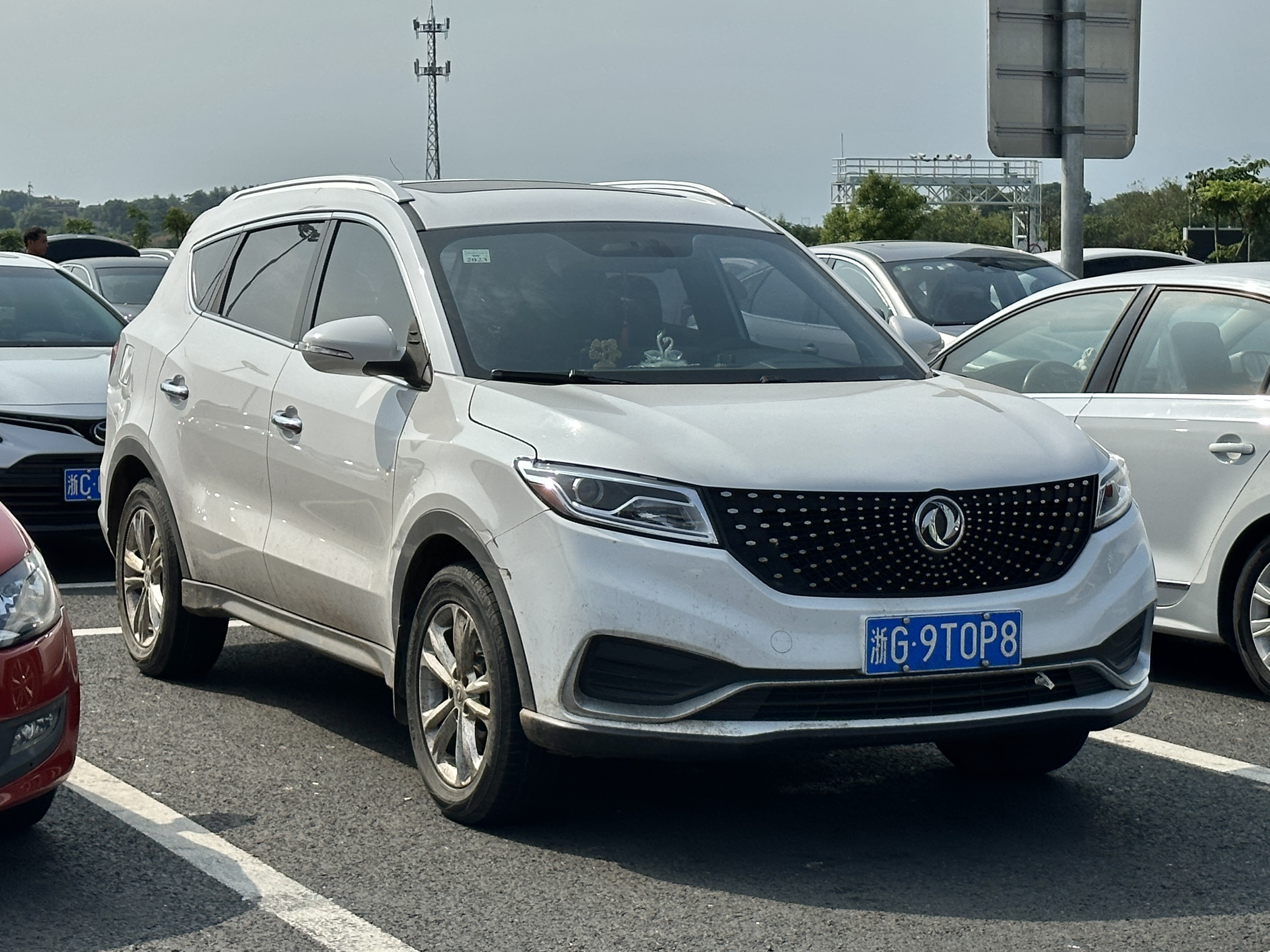
Fengon 580 Pro (2020)

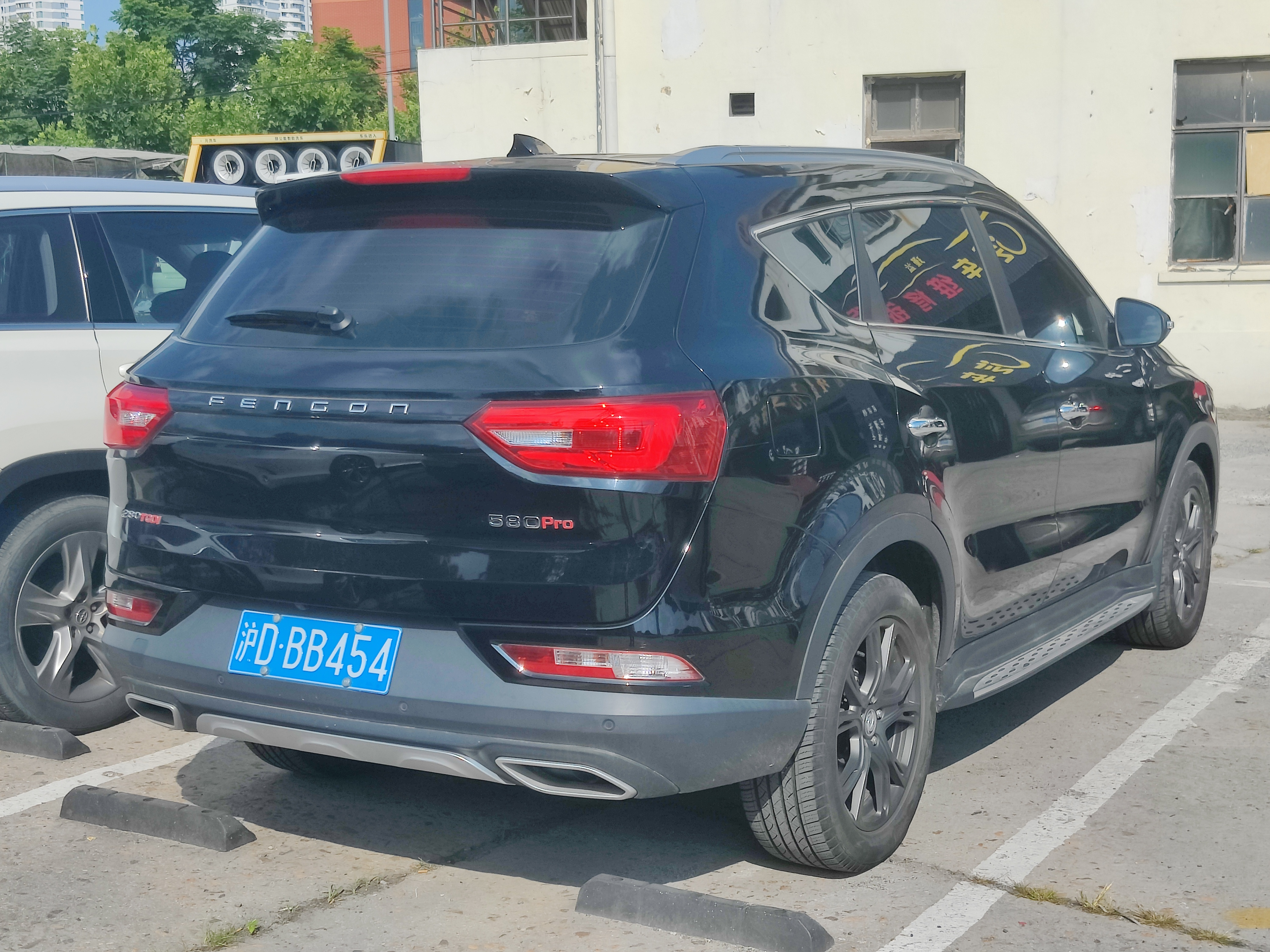
Rear view (2020)

=== DFSK Glory i-Auto ===
The DFSK Glory i-Auto is the flagship variant of the 580. It was first unveiled in Indonesia at the 27th Gaikindo Indonesia International Auto Show in July 2019 as a prototype, based on the facelifted 580 launched in China in 2018. In March 2020, DFSK previewed the final production version of the Glory i-Auto, which sports the front fascia from the Chinese-market 580 Pro. It was launched in Indonesia on 22 July 2020 as the replacement of the Glory 580. The Glory i-Auto was also sold in Brunei from 26 November 2020, and in Thailand from 1 September 2021 with units sourced from Indonesia.

Unlike the standard 580, the Glory i-Auto features a voice command system named i-Talk. As of 2025, the system supports only the English language.

== Second generation (2021) ==
Second generation
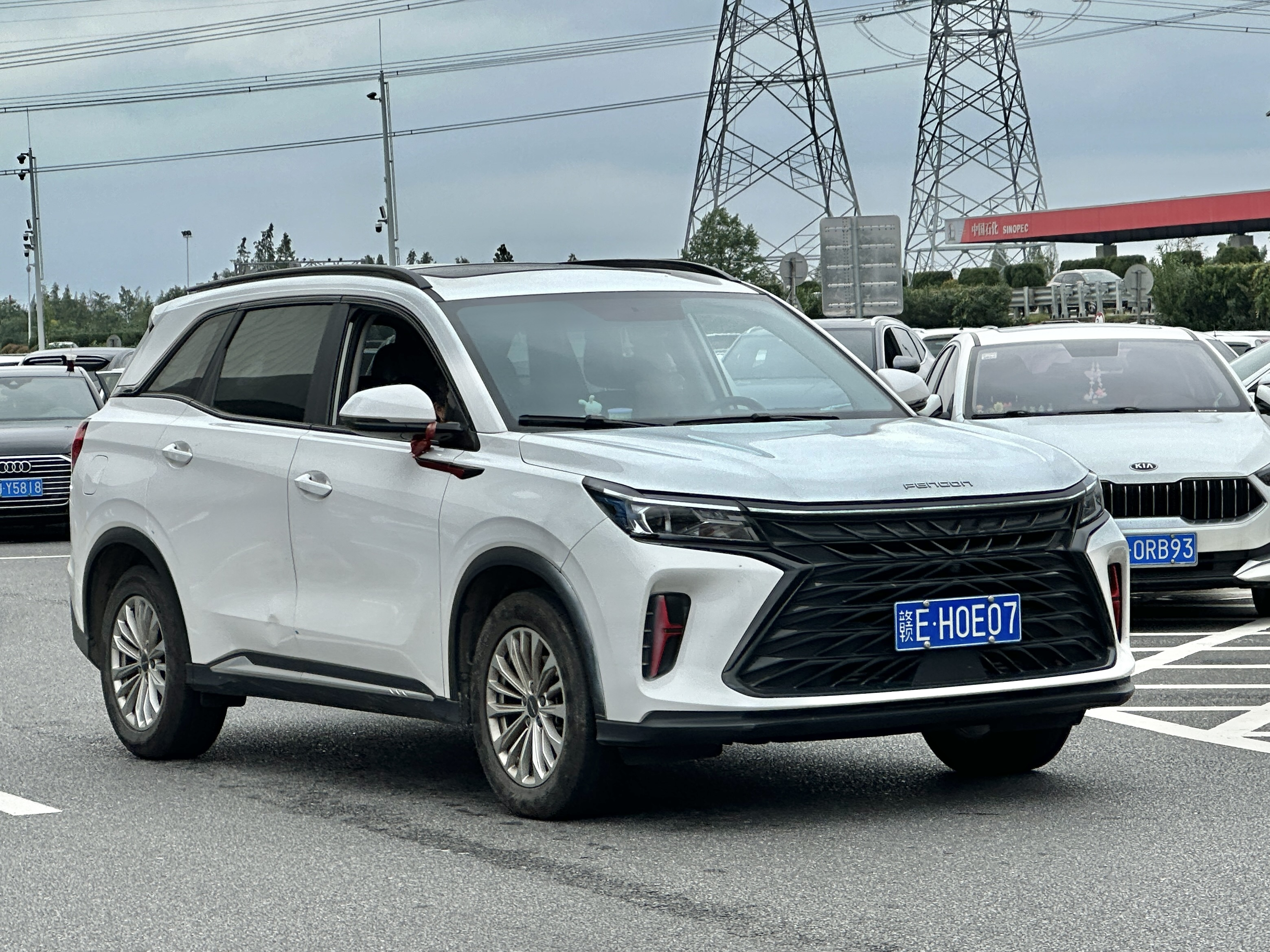

Overview
- Also called: New Fengon 580; Landian E5 (NEV); DFSK 600 (Europe); DFSK E5 (Europe); Navor E5 (Europe); DFSK E5 Plus (Thailand, Indonesia); Cirelli 4 (Italy, since 2024); Evolute i-SPACE (Russia); Artaban (AMG) Tooka (Iran)
- Production: 2021–present
- Model years: 2022–present
- Assembly: China: Chongqing; Indonesia: Serang, Banten (Sokonindo Automobile)

Body and chassis
- Class: Mid-size SUV
- Body style: 5-door crossover SUV
- Layout: Front-engine, front-wheel-drive

Powertrain
- Engine: Petrol: 1.5 L HD15M1A I4 turbo; Petrol plug-in hybrid/REEV: 1.5 L DE-i I4 + electric motor (Landian E5)
- Electric motor: BYD DHT300 electric motor
- Power output: 160 kW (218 PS; 215 hp) (PHEV/REEV)
- Transmission: 6-speed automatic; DHT (Landian E5)
- Hybrid drivetrain: PHEV (E5 Plus PHEV); EREV (E5 Plus EREV)
- Battery: 18.4 or 25.3 kWh FinDreams Blade LFP
- Electric range: 67 km (42 mi) (WLTP); 100 km (62 mi) (NEDC)

Dimensions
- Wheelbase: 2,785 mm (109.6 in)
- Length: 4,720 mm (185.8 in)
- Width: 1,865 mm (73.4 in)
- Height: 1,710 mm (67.3 in)

The second-generation Fengon 580 was launched in the Chinese domestic market, while the first-generation model continued to be produced as a more affordable option. Both generations were sold alongside each other, with the second-generation marketed as the New 580, and the first-generation offered as a more affordable special edition known as the Red Star Edition. The second-generation 580 features a dual-screen dashboard consisting of a 12.3-inch interconnected intelligent control screen and a 7-inch full LCD. The model is available with a 2+2+2 seating arrangement accommodating six passengers, and includes an eight-way electrically adjustable second-row seat with heating, ventilation, and a sleeping headrest.

The updated 580 is equipped with a 1.5-litre TGDI engine developing a maximum power of 184 horsepower (187 PS; 137 kW) and peak torque of 300 N⋅m (31 kg⋅m; 221 lb⋅ft), meeting National 6b emissions standards. The gearbox is a 6-speed automatic transmission, and the claimed fuel consumption is 7.0 L/100 km (14.3 km/L; 40.4 mpg_{‑imp}; 33.6 mpg_{‑US}). The 1.5-litre TGDI engine is independently developed by DFSK and adopts Miller-cycle combustion technology.

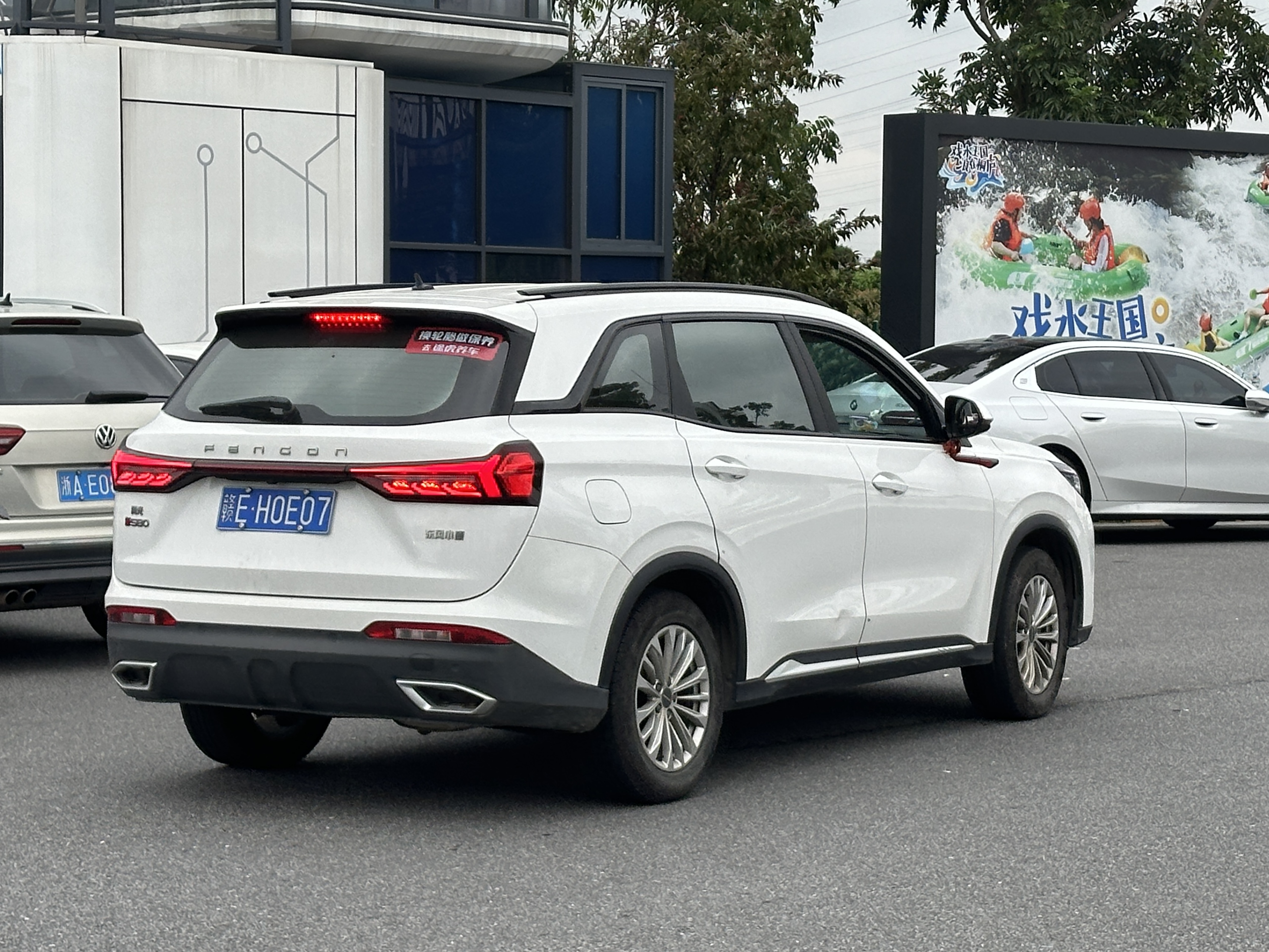
Rear view

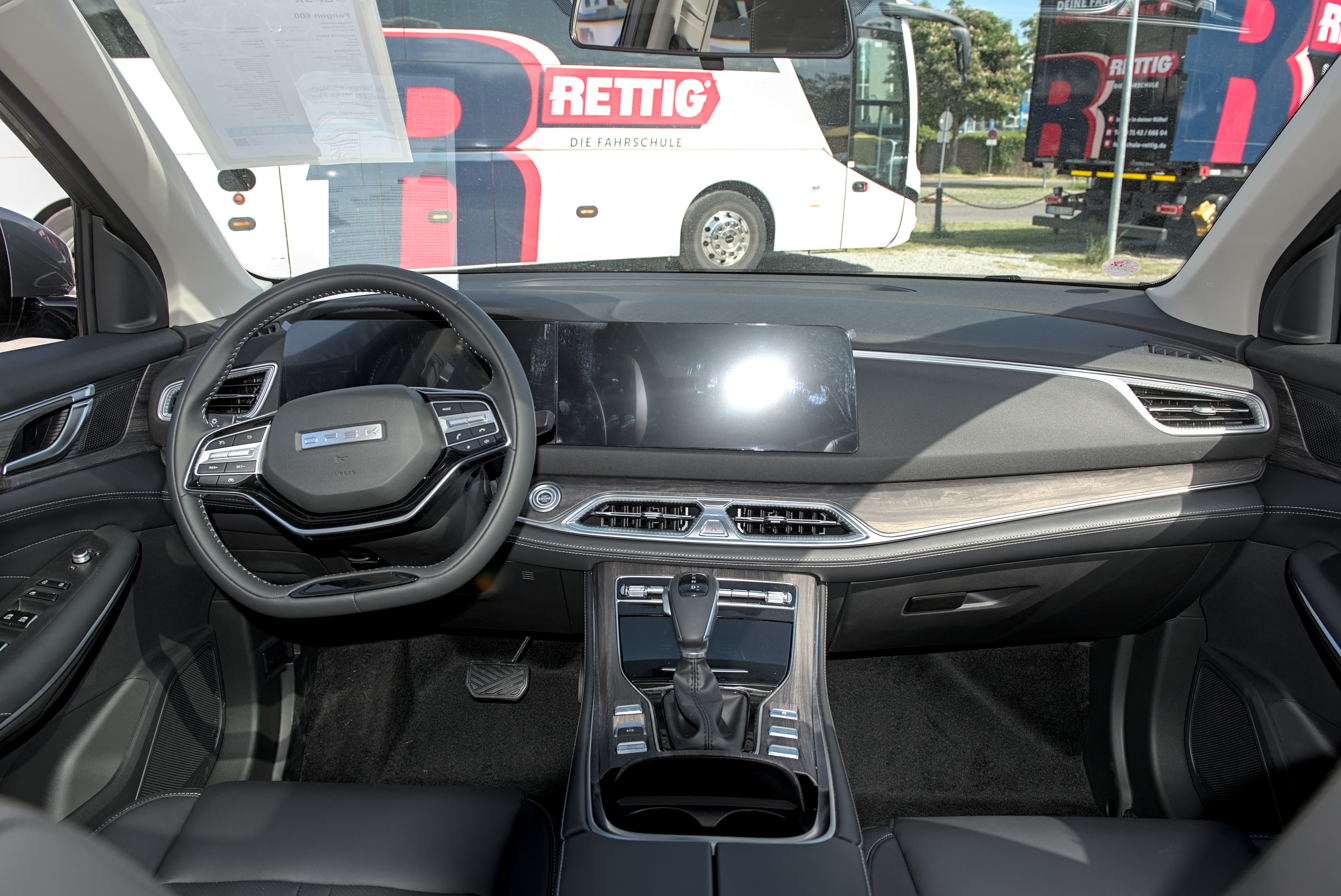
Interior

=== Landian E5 ===
The Landian E5 (Chinese: 蓝电E5) is the electrified variant of the second-generation 580, available as a plug-in hybrid (PHEV) or a range-extender electric vehicle (REEV). It debuted at the 2023 Haikou New Energy Auto Show in China and was launched in the Chinese market in March 2023. The Landian E5 is built on the DE-i super electric drive intelligent platform from Seres and is equipped with a 1.5-litre plug-in hybrid engine and DHT300 electric hybrid system sourced from FinDreams Powertrain, a subsidiary of BYD Auto. The 0-to-50 km/h (0-to-31 mph) acceleration time is 2.9 seconds, and a maximum combined WLTC cruising range of 1,150 km (715 mi) is claimed. Fuel consumption is 5.5 L/100 km (18.2 km/L; 51.4 mpg_{‑imp}; 42.8 mpg_{‑US}).

Since 2024 it has been available in select European markets including Italy and Belgium. The European version is Euro 6e approved and has a WLTP-rated electric range of 67 km (42 mi).

In the Chinese market, the E5 Plus EV variant is available with an optional slide-out rear cargo area platform with a dual-induction stove, tea table, and tea dispenser built into the front centre console.

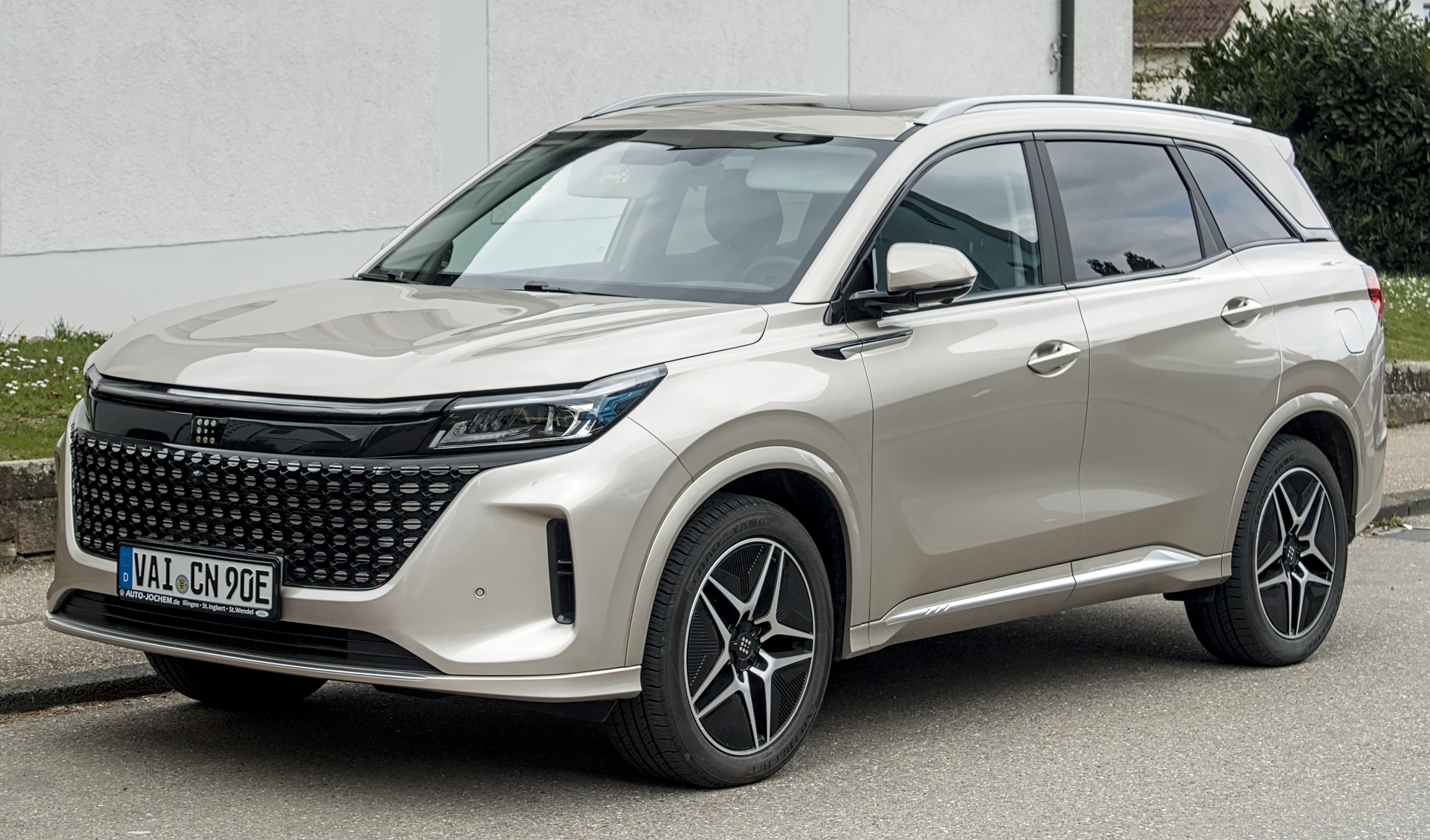
DFSK E5 (Europe)

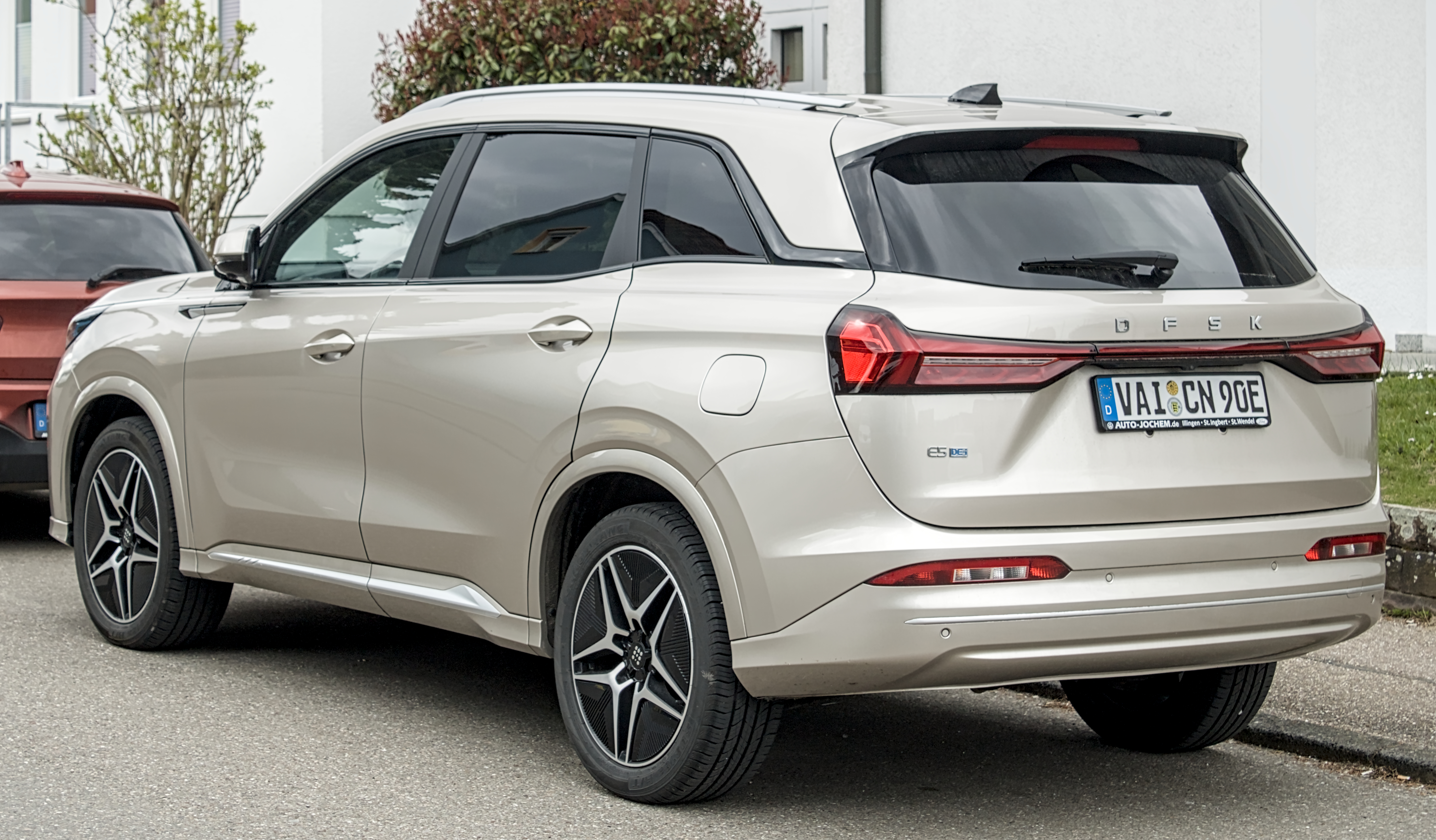
Rear view

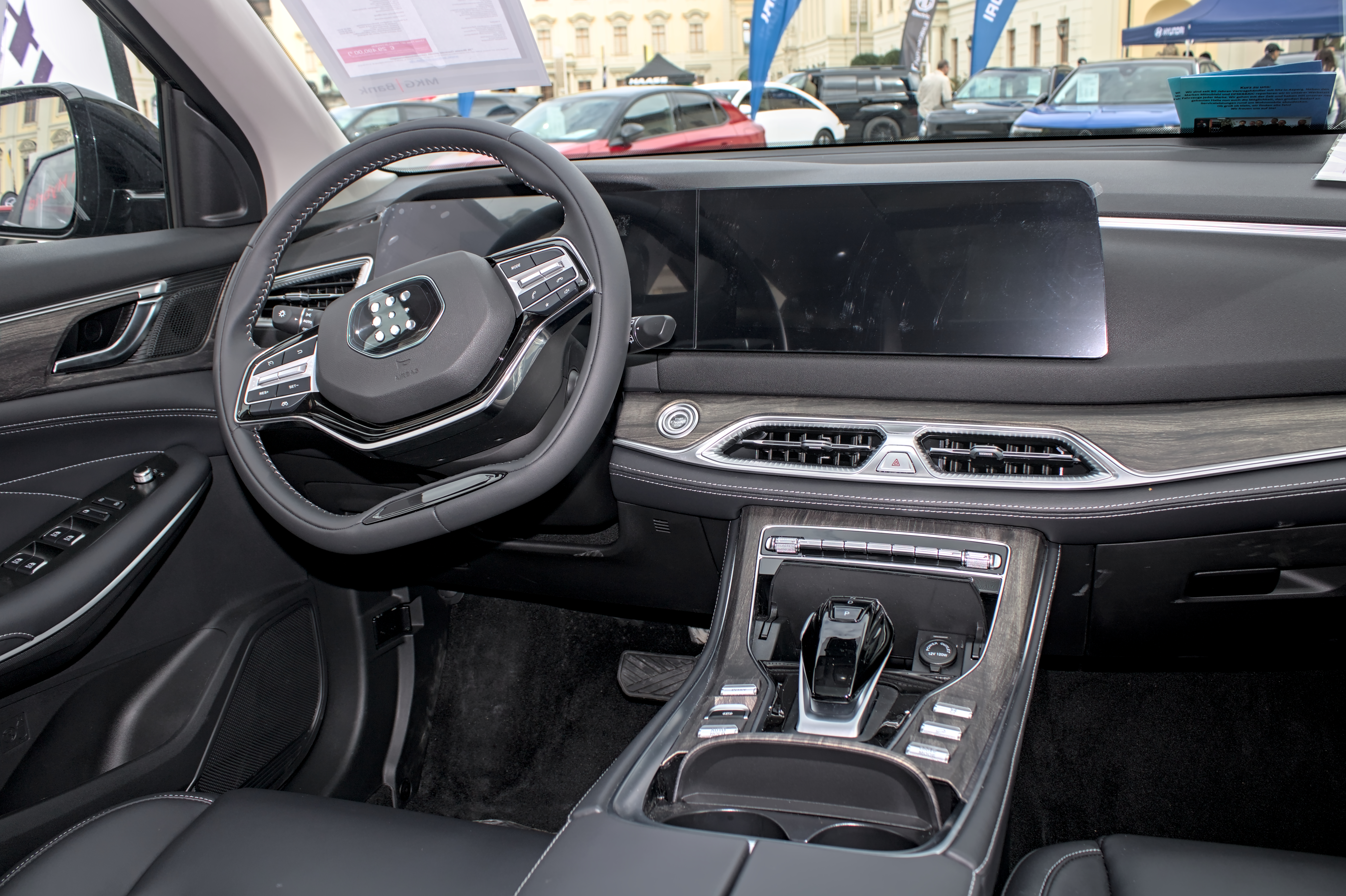
Interior

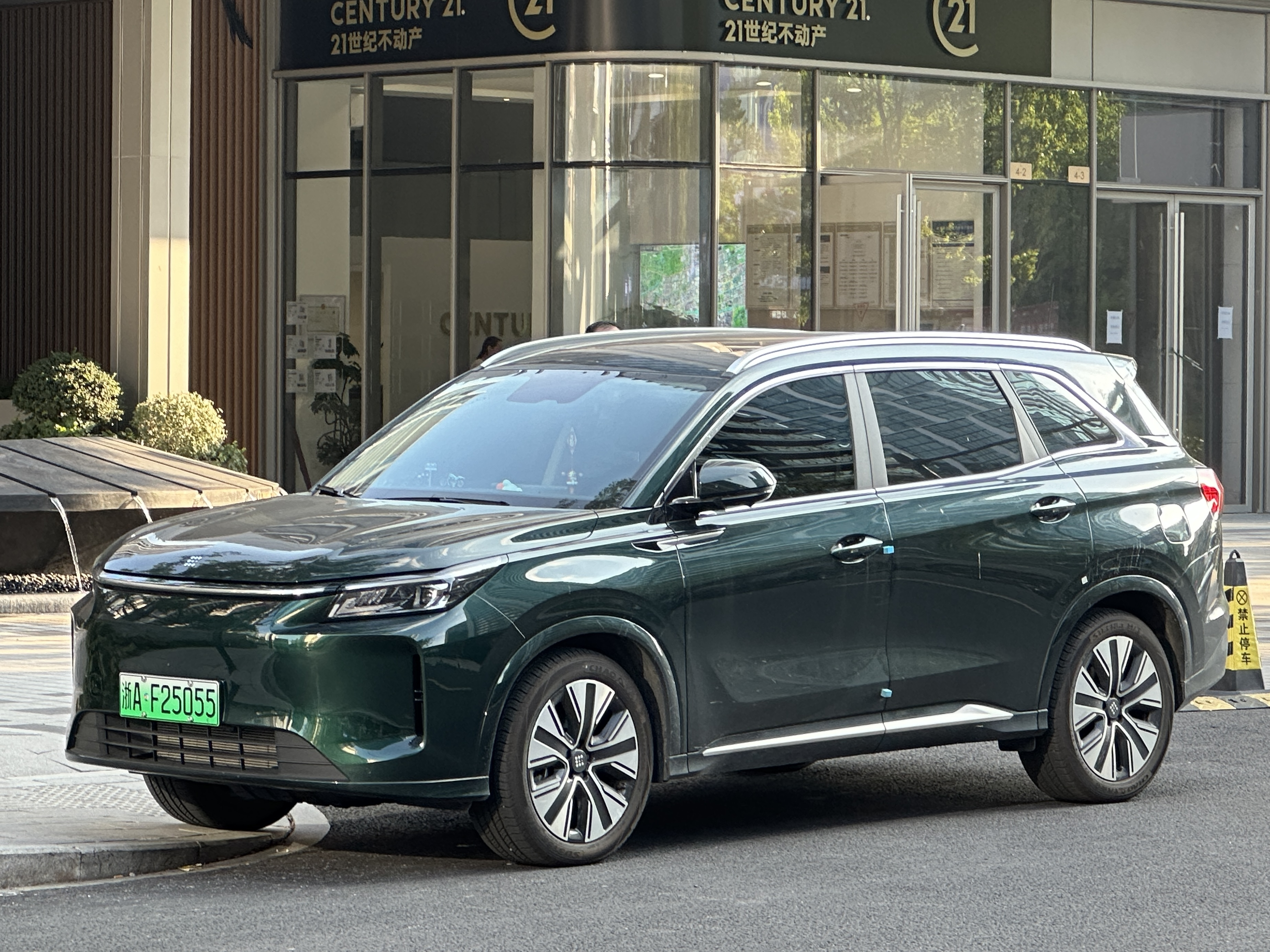
Landian E5 Plus

== Sales ==
Fengon 580
Year	China
2022	21,019
2023	6,068
2024	2,507
2025	148

Landian E5
Year	China
2023	12,575
2024	29,193
2025	19,962
