= AITO M9 =

Full-size luxury SUV

- AITO M9 (second generation)

Overview
- Manufacturer: Seres Auto
- Production: 2023–present
- Assembly: China: Chongqing

Body and chassis
- Class: Full-size luxury SUV (F)
- Body style: 5-door SUV

The AITO M9 (Chinese: 问界M9; pinyin: Wènjiè M9) is a battery electric and range-extended full-size luxury SUV manufactured by Seres under the AITO brand in collaboration with HIMA, Huawei's multi-brand automotive alliance and sales network, since 2023. It is currently the largest and most expensive vehicle from the brand. A second generation M9 was announced in 2026.

== First generation (2023) ==
First generation
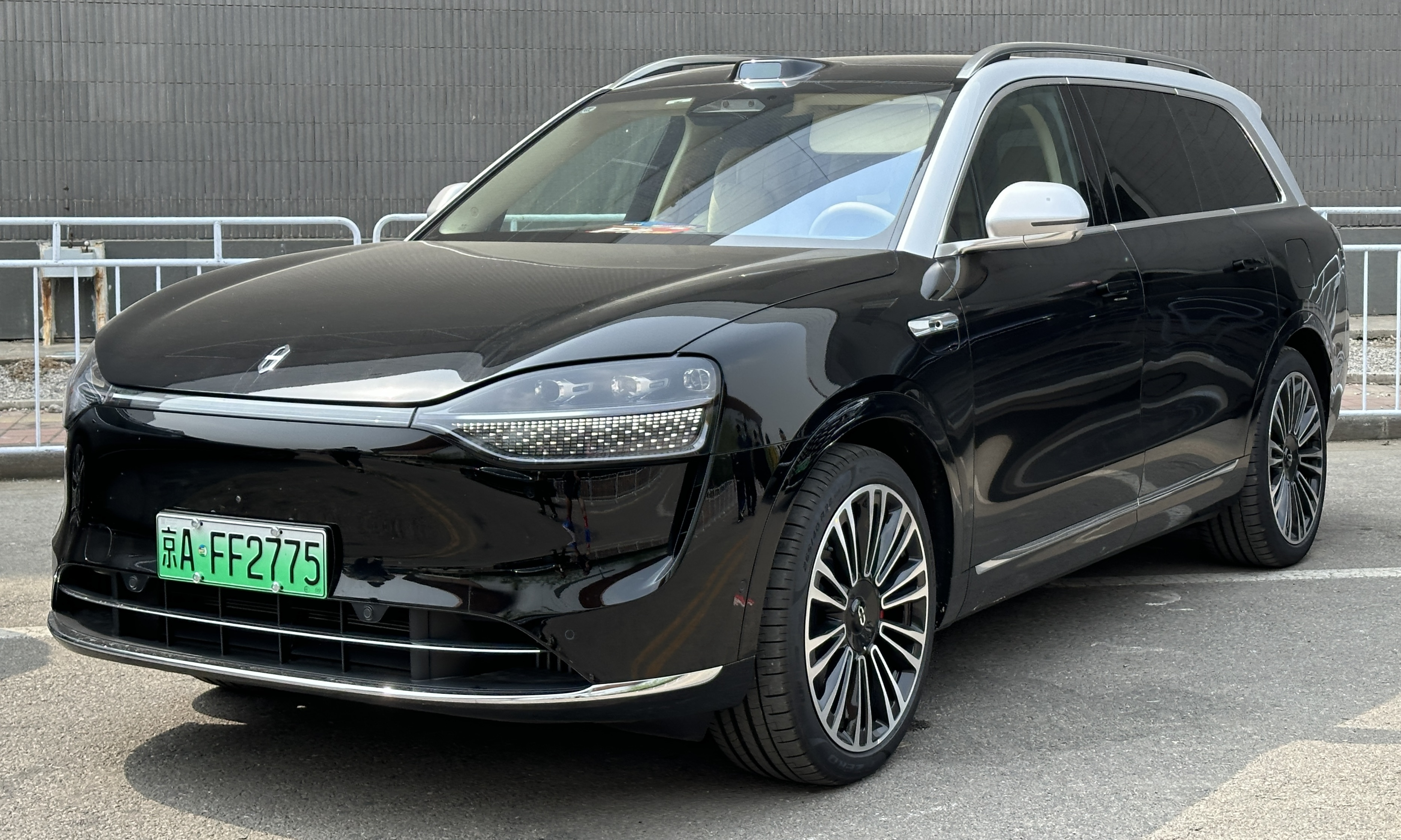

Overview
- Also called: AITO 9 (export)
- Production: October 2023 – 2026
- Assembly: China: Jiangbei, Chongqing
- Designer: Wu Guoping, Yang Ziming, Chen Lei, Ding Liuping, Wang Lizhou

Body and chassis
- Layout: Battery electric: Dual-motor, all-wheel-drive; Extended-range EV: Front-engine, dual-motor, all-wheel drive
- Platform: Seres MF Platform
- Related: AITO M6; AITO M7 (Second generation); AITO M8

Powertrain
- Engine: Gasoline range extender: 1.5 L H15RT turbo I4 (2023–2025); 1.5 L HG15T turbo I4 (2025–2026)
- Power output: 390 kW (530 PS) (EV); 365 kW (496 PS) (EREV)
- Hybrid drivetrain: Range extender series plug-in hybrid (EREV)
- Battery: 100 kWh NMC CATL (EV 2023–2026); 42 kWh NMC CATL (EREV 2023–2025); 52 kWh NMC CATL (EREV 2023–2026)
- Range: EREV (2023): 1,362–1,402 km (846–871 mi) CLTC; EREV (2025): 1,417–1,474 km (880–916 mi) CLTC
- Electric range: CLTC: 605–630 km (376–391 mi) (EV 2023–2025); 225–275 km (140–171 mi) (EREV 2023); 266–290 km (165–180 mi) (EREV 2025)

Dimensions
- Wheelbase: 3,110 mm (122.4 in)
- Length: 5,230 mm (205.9 in)
- Width: 1,999 mm (78.7 in)
- Height: 1,800 mm (70.9 in)
- Curb weight: 2,340 kg (5,159 lb)

The first generation AITO M9 was pre-released and pre-orders began on April 17, 2023 at Huawei's nova 11 series and all-scenario products launch event and launched on December 26 at Huawei's winter all-scenario products conference in China. The vehicle adopts the design concept called "Kunpeng Zhanyi", and it has a drag coefficient of 0.264 Cd for the EV version and 0.279 Cd for the EREV version.

Developed in collaboration with Harmony Intelligent Mobility Alliance (HIMA), the M9 is equipped with many technologies from Huawei, such as the HarmonyOS intelligent cockpit and Huawei ADS (Chinese: 华为乾崑智驾® or 华为辅助驾驶系统) 2.0 (upgraded to ADS 3.0 and 4 in late 2024 and 2025), which is an AI-powered advanced driver assistance system (ADAS) consisting of one Lidar, three millimetre wave radars, 12 ultrasonic sensors and eleven cameras. The M9 is built on Huawei Tuling platform, which is equipped with multi-modal fusion perception system, Huawei DATS Dynamic Adaptive Torque System and Huawei xMotion Intelligent Body Collaborative Control System. It is available in two model configurations, Max and Ultra.

The AITO M9 is built with an aluminum chassis, which 80 percent of its body-in-white is made of. It is also equipped with air suspension with a ride-height adjustment range of 80 mm (3.1 in). Other equipment include a 75-inch augmented reality head-up display, a 25-speaker sound system, three screens on the dashboard consisting of a 12.3 inch instrument panel, a 15.6-inch central display, and a 16-inch front passenger's monitor. Four 10-inch screens for the second and third-row passengers can be added as an option, as well as a retractable projection screen with a 32-inch laser projector for rear passengers. It is equipped with the Shuyun Dual Seats, Zero Gravity Seat 2.0 and Huawei Xpixel lighting system.

In September 2024, the five-seat version was released. It has 1,220 mm (48.0 in) of legroom space in the second row and is equipped with dual Zero Gravity Seats.

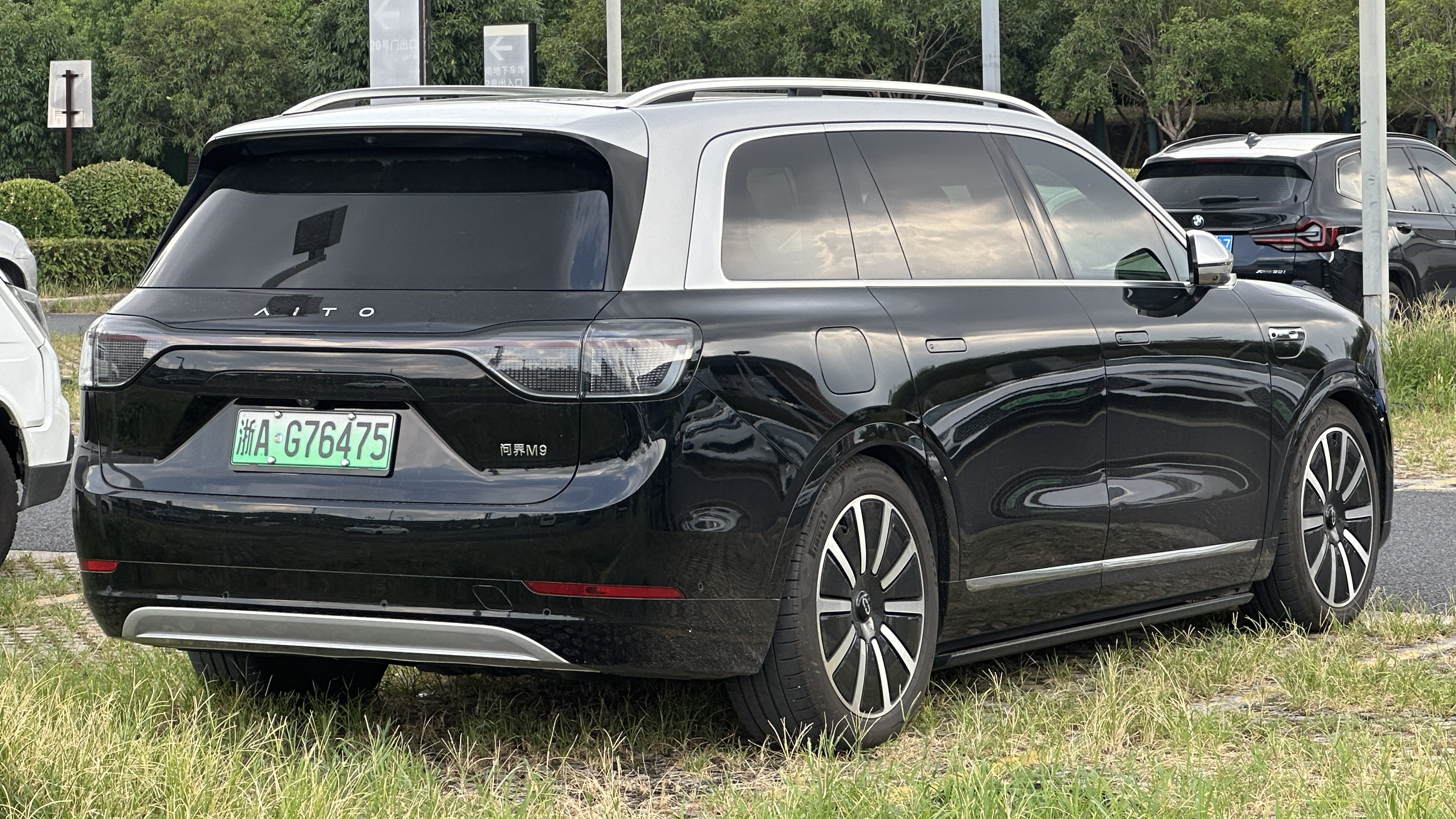
Rear view

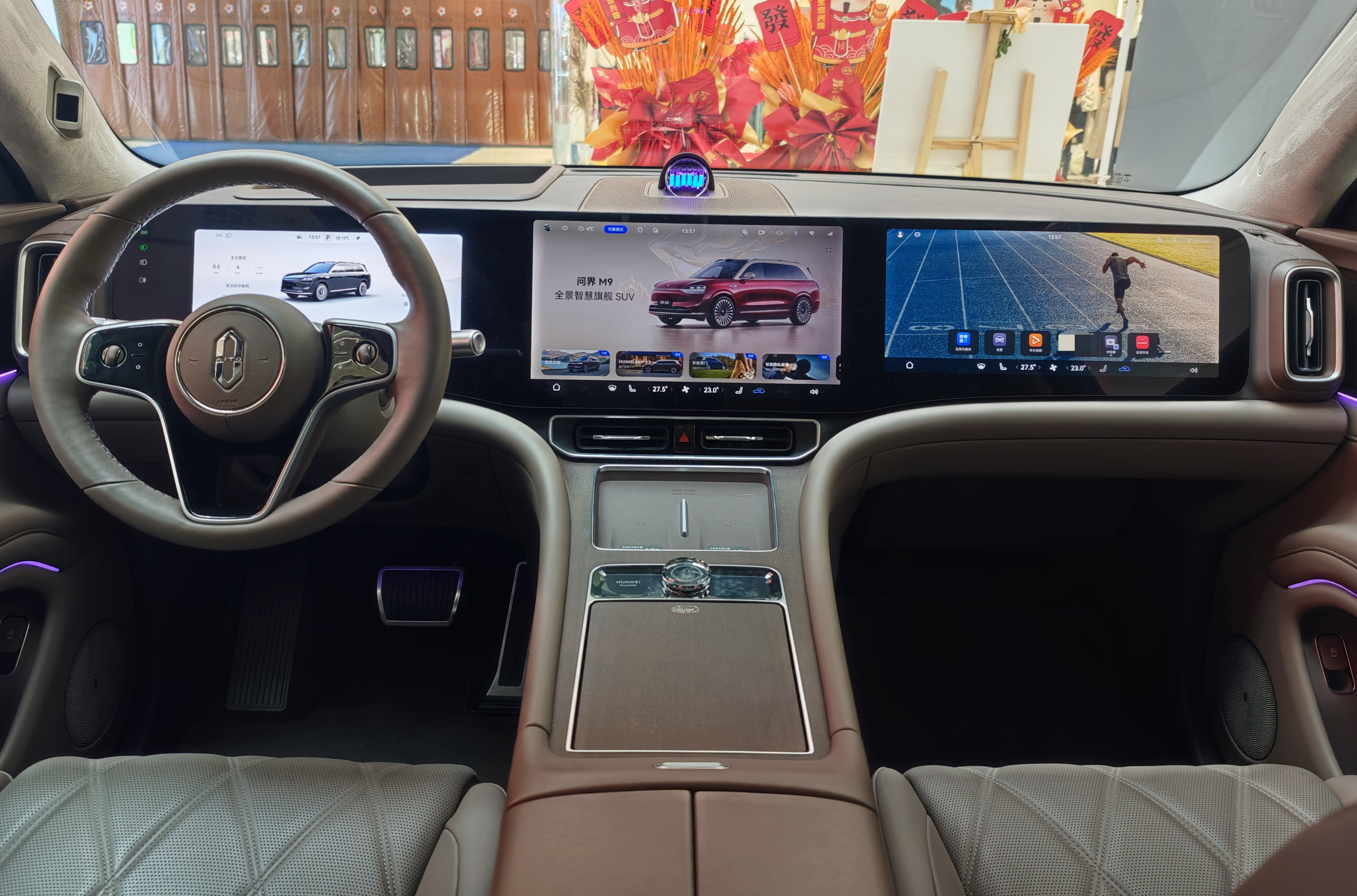
Interior

=== Update (2025) ===
The M9 received a minor update for the 2025 model year, with sales starting on March 20, 2025 after a pre-order period opened two weeks before. The exterior remains unchanged outside of a new red and beige two-tone color option, a new 21-inch wheel option, power-retracting running boards, and exterior gesture-controlled doors. Changes to the interior include a power thigh support adjustment for the driver's seat, an upgraded rear seat projector with twice the resolution and 63% higher brightness, variable tinting side windows, and a refrigerator compartment with heating and cooling functions for temperatures between 0–50 °C (32–122 °F).

The ADAS system was upgraded to the Huawei ADS 3.3 system, which adds three short-range LiDAR sensors to the front fenders and rear in addition to the existing long-range front-facing roof-mounted sensor for a total of four LiDARs, and two additional mmWave radars for a total of five such sensors. Compared to the previous system, it is capable of navigating unmanned between levels in multi-story parking structures, is able to navigate roundabouts and gates, and is able to handle more complex road conditions. It is also equipped with two additional external microphones to better detect and yield to emergency vehicles. It is expected to be updated to the Huawei ADS 4 system in late 2025. It also features Huawei's Xinghe satellite communication system for increased network connection reliability when terrestrial network signals are unavailable, which can be shared with devices within a 30-metre (100 ft) range of the vehicle.

The range extender powertrain received a refresh, with the 1.5-litre engine updated to produce 118 kW (158 hp; 160 PS). The smaller battery pack option was discontinued, and electric CLTC range ratings with the remaining 52 kWh pack increases to 266–290 km (165–180 mi), and combined range increases to 1,474 km (916 mi). Power output remains the same, and the battery electric powertrain continues unchanged.

On September 23, 2025, the four-seater version was revealed. This is a special configuration package for the M9 Ultra five-seat version, which comes with three optional features: Luxury Zero Gravity Seat Package, Intelligent Privacy Windows, and Electric Steps (total discount of RMB 10,000 for the whole vehicle), and adds a Silver Purple exterior color.

In March 2026, a version of the M9 equipped with an 896-line dual-optical-path image-level LiDAR will be released.

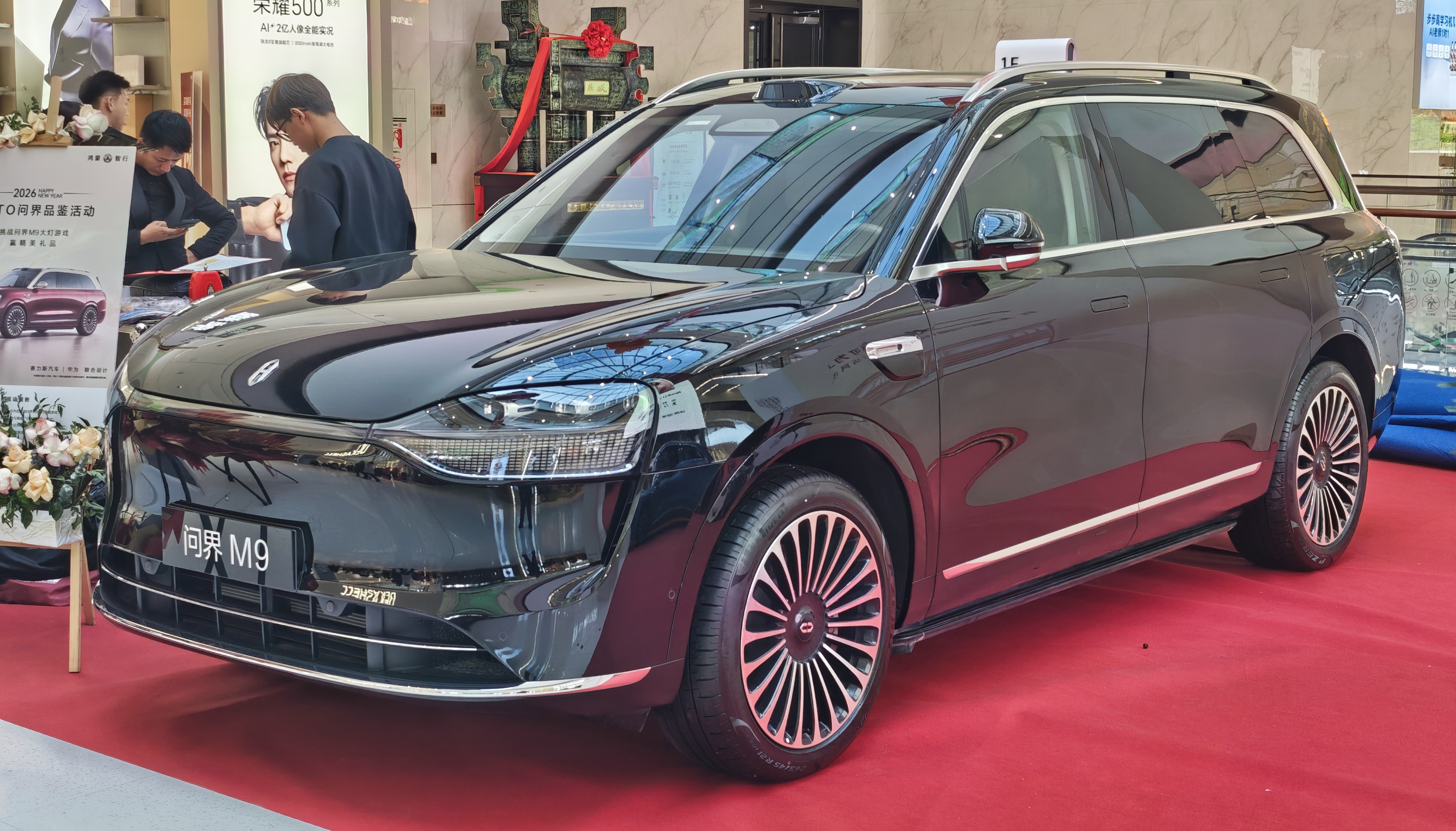
Front view (MY2025)

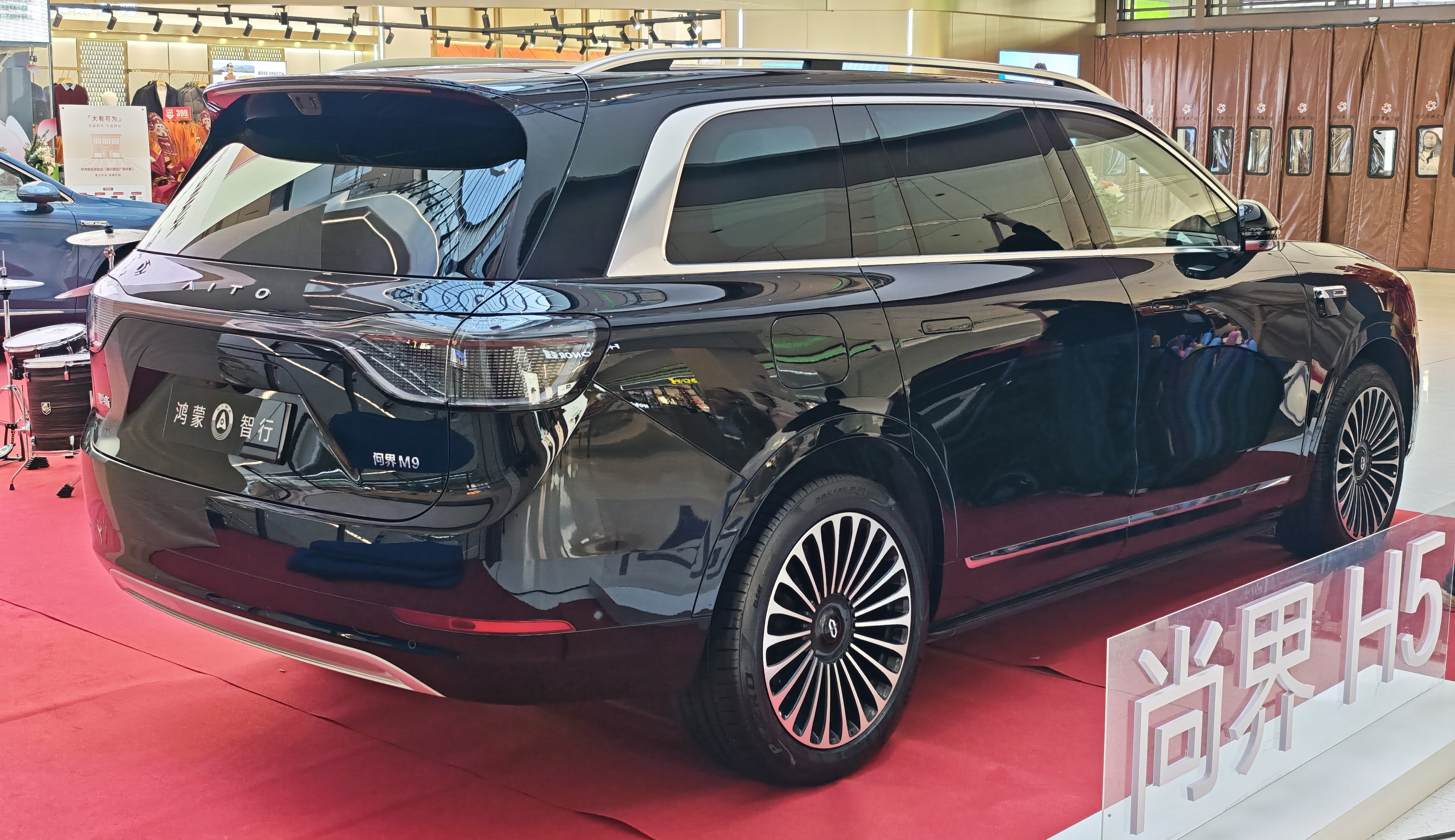
Rear view (MY2025)

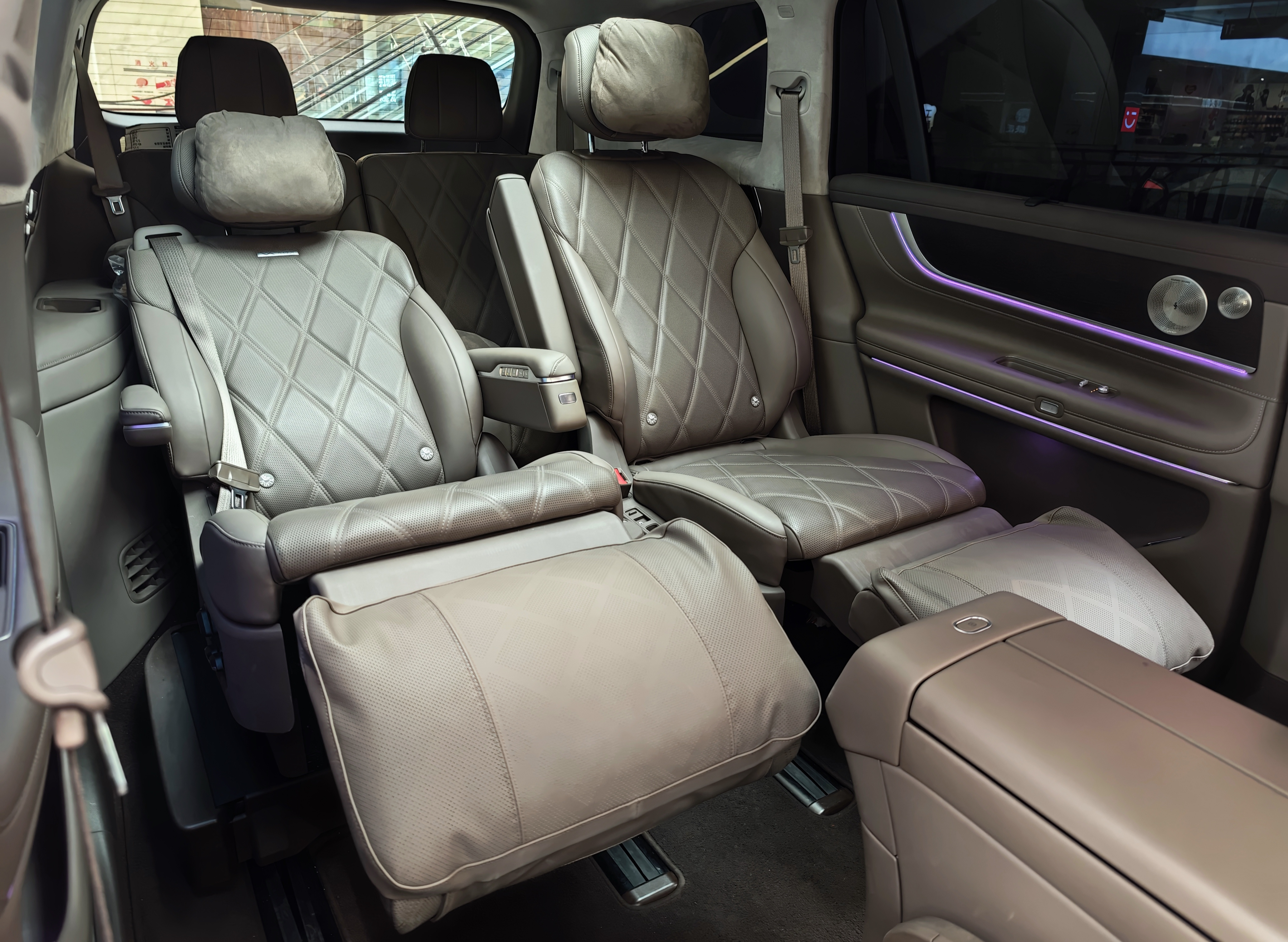
6-seat version Zero Gravity Seat (MY2025)

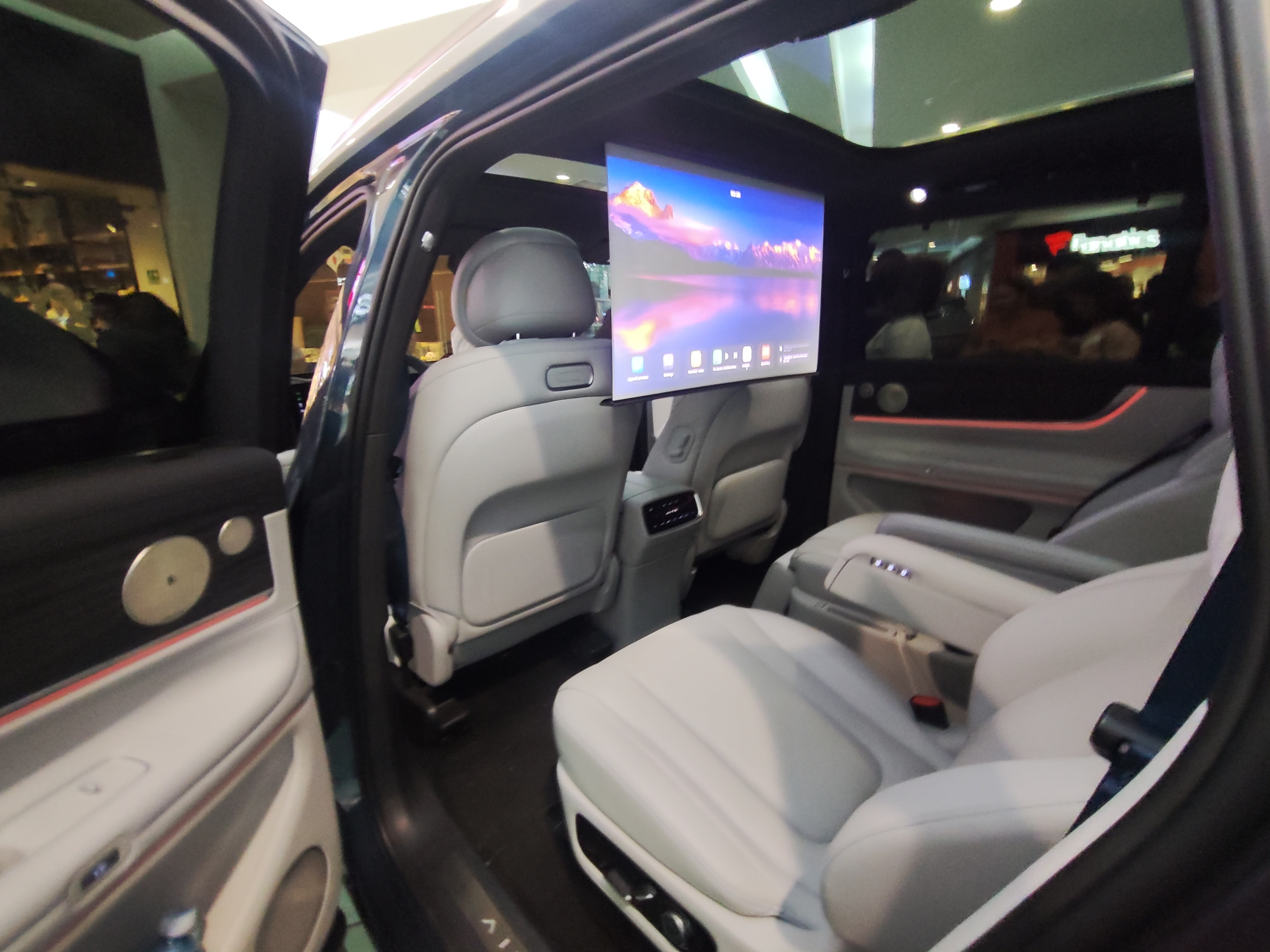
Rear middle row interior with projection screen

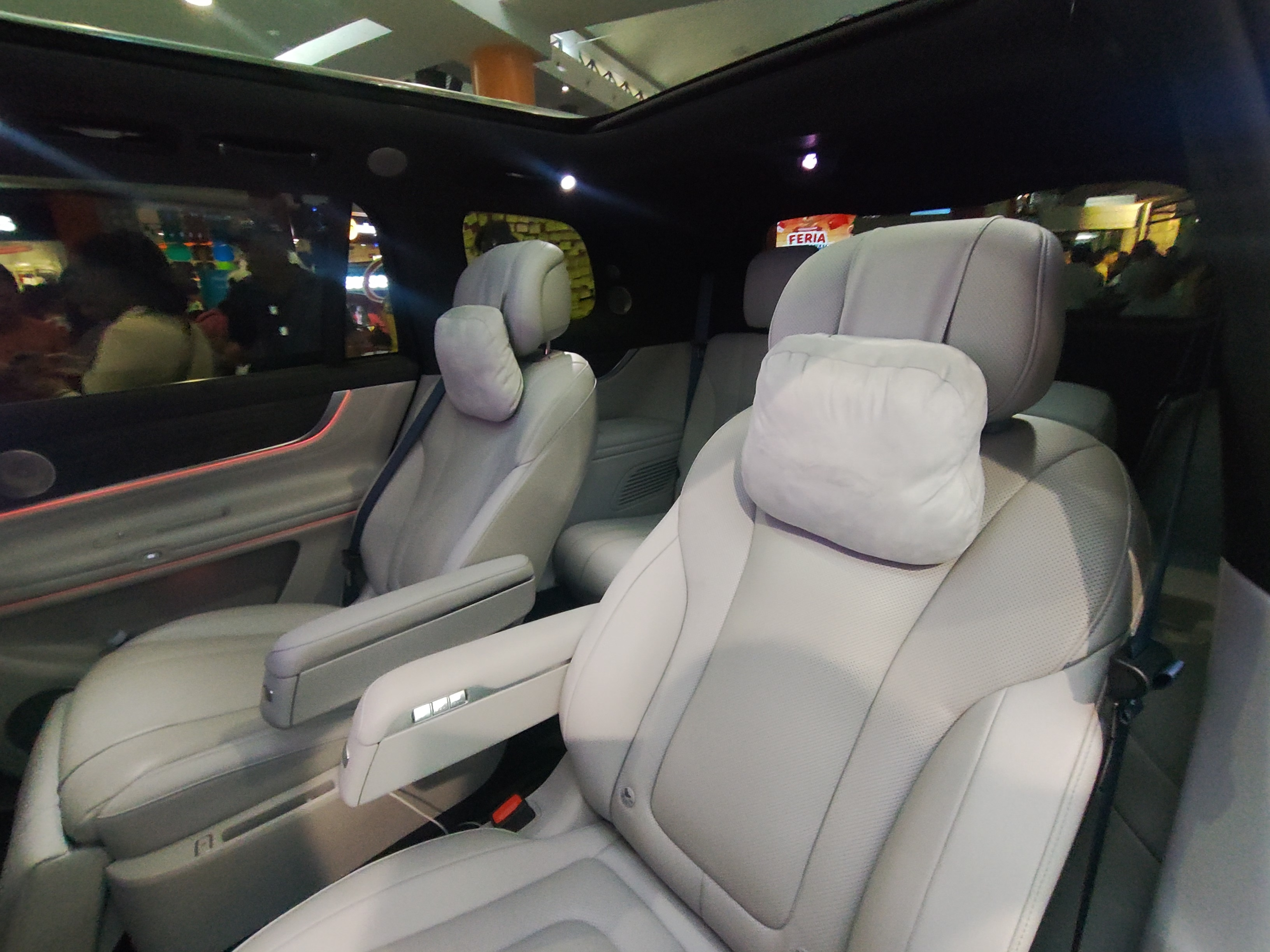
The AITO M9 middle row standard passenger seats.

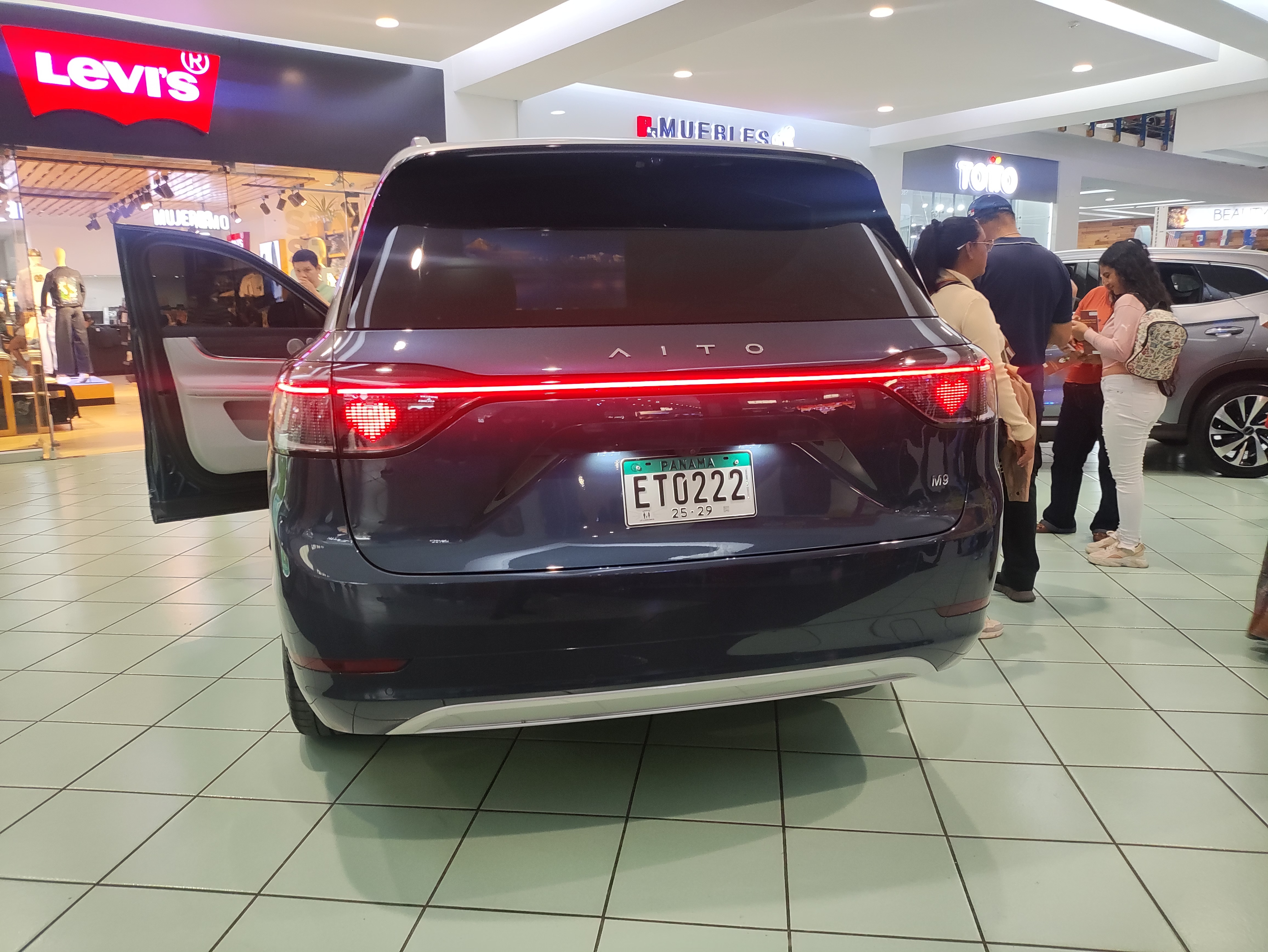
The export of AITO M9 tailgate with pixel taillights.

=== Specifications ===
==== Extended range electric ====
The EREV version of M9 is equipped with a 112 kW (150 hp; 152 PS) 1.5-liter turbocharged port-injected gasoline engine acting as a generator. The all-wheel drive layout is powered by two electric motors producing a total of 365 kW (489 hp; 496 PS). The front motor provides a power output of 165 kW (221 hp; 224 PS) and 315 N⋅m (232 lb⋅ft) of torque, while the rear motor provides 200 kW (270 hp; 270 PS) and 360 N⋅m (266 lb⋅ft) of torque. It is available with two battery options, 42 kWh or 52 kWh NMC batteries from CATL, supporting maximum all-electric ranges of 225 km (140 mi) and 275 km (171 mi) respectively, while the combined range reaches 1,362 km (846 mi) or 1,402 km (871 mi) km. (Note: Under fully charged conditions, the M9 EREV's CLTC combined range and pure electric range data come from Seres Group Testing Center, using 21-inch low-wind resistance wheels and a 52 kWh battery.) It has a 0–100 km/h (0–62 mph) acceleration time of 4.9 seconds.

For 2025, the smaller 42 kWh battery pack is dropped and the 1.5-litre engine was replaced with the newer HG15T model outputting 118 kW (158 hp; 160 PS). The 52 kWh battery now provides all-electric range ratings between 266–290 km (165–180 mi), and a combined range between 1,417–1,474 km (880–916 mi) depending on the configuration.

==== Battery electric ====
The BEV version of M9 is built on an 800-volt electrical architecture which is powered by two electric motors, producing 390 kW (523 hp; 530 PS) combined. The front motor provide a power output of 160 kW (215 hp; 218 PS) and 277 N⋅m (204 lb⋅ft) of torque, while the rear motor provides 230 kW (308 hp; 313 PS) and 396 N⋅m (292 lb⋅ft) of torque. It is equipped with a 100 kWh NMC battery pack from CATL, and has a range between 615–630 km (382–391 mi). It has a 0–100 km/h (0–62 mph) acceleration time of 4.3 seconds. (Note: This data comes from the Seres Group Testing Center.)

Drivetrain
Model	Battery	Power output			Gasoline engine		Range	Top speed
Model	Battery	Front	Rear	Total	Type	Power	Range	Top speed
Dual motor EV	100 kWh NMC CATL	YS210XYA03; 160 kW (215 hp; 218 PS)	TZ210XYA03; 230 kW (308 hp; 313 PS)	390 kW (523 hp; 530 PS)	–		605–630 km (376–391 mi)	210 km/h (130 mph)
Dual motor EREV	52 kWh NMC CATL	CYS210XY0P1; 165 kW (221 hp; 224 PS)	CYZ196XY0P4; 200 kW (268 hp; 272 PS)	365 kW (489 hp; 496 PS)	1.5 L turbo	118 kW (158 hp; 160 PS)	266–290 km (165–180 mi)	200 km/h (124 mph)

=== Safety ===
C-NCAP (2021) test results 2024 AITO M9 Max (EV)
Category		%
Overall:	5.5 /5 stars	93.9%
Occupant protection:		96.98%
Vulnerable road users:		75.38%
Active safety:		97.79%

In July 2024, AITO M9 was awarded a "super" five-star safety certification from C-NCAP (2021 version) with a score of 93.9%, becoming the highest-scoring model in the history of C-NCAP.

=== Marketing ===
In June 2025, AITO became a full strategic partner of the 2025 China Golden Rooster and Hundred Flowers Film Festival. As the official designated car, the M9 will escort all important activities during the film festival.

=== International markets ===
==== United Arab Emirates ====
On February 6, 2026, AITO signed a cooperation agreement with Performance Plus Motors, a subsidiary of the luxury car dealership network Abu Dhabi Motors. In the United Arab Emirates the M9 is known as the AITO 9. It is the first AITO brand and HIMA vehicle to be sold outside China, deliveries to the UAE commenced on the same day, alongside test drives.

== Second generation (2026) ==
Second generation
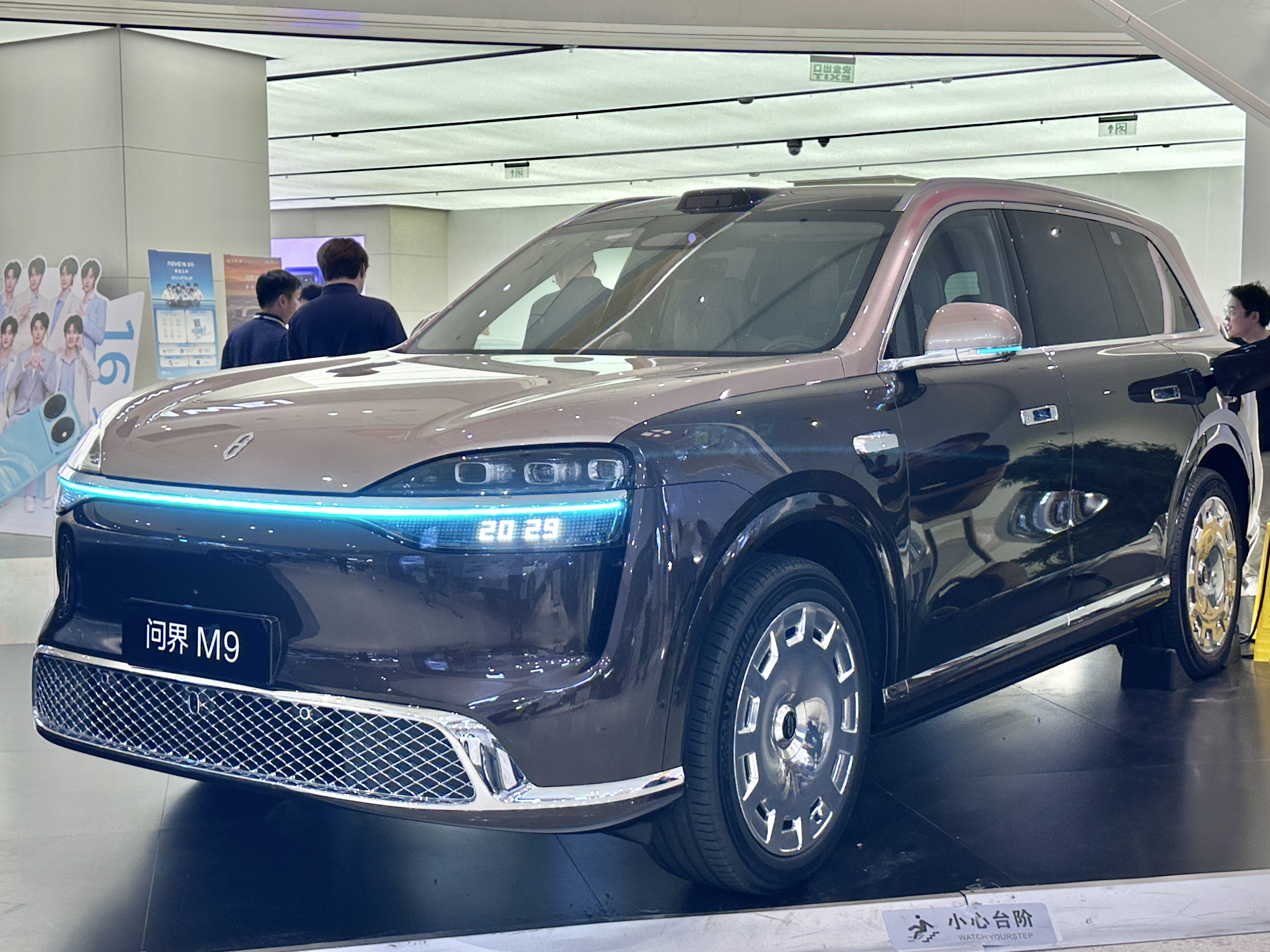

Overview
- Production: May 2026 – present
- Assembly: China: Jiangbei, Chongqing

Body and chassis
- Layout: Battery electric: Dual-motor, all-wheel-drive; Extended-range EV: Front-engine, dual-motor, all-wheel drive; Front-engine, tri-motor, all-wheel-drive (Ultimate)
- Platform: Seres MF Platform
- Related: AITO M6; AITO M7 (Second generation); AITO M8

Powertrain
- Engine: Gasoline range extender: 1.5 L HG15T turbo I4; 2.0 L HG20T turbo I4 (Ultimate)
- Power output: 497–664 kW (676–903 PS)
- Hybrid drivetrain: Range extender series plug-in hybrid (EREV)
- Battery: 60 kWh NMC CATL; 75.4 kWh NMC CATL; 120 kWh Qilin NMC CATL
- Range: 1,100–1,245 km (684–774 mi) (WLTP)
- Electric range: WLTP: 280–355 km (174–221 mi) (EREV); CLTC: 700–750 km (430–470 mi) (EV); 340–422 km (211–262 mi) (EREV)

Dimensions
- Wheelbase: 3,125 mm (123.0 in); 3,236 mm (127.4 in) (Ultimate)
- Length: 5,285 mm (208.1 in); 5,402 mm (212.7 in) (Ultimate)
- Width: 2,026 mm (79.8 in)
- Height: 1,845 mm (72.6 in)
- Curb weight: 2,945–3,030 kg (6,493–6,680 lb) (EV); 2,920–2,995 kg (6,437–6,603 lb) (EREV); 3,105 kg (6,845 lb) (Ultimate EV); 3,200 kg (7,055 lb) (Ultimate EREV)

In April 2026, HIMA previewed the second generation AITO M9 series. Pre-orders for the second generation M9 series opened on April 22, 2026, at the HIMA Spring New Product Launch Conference and officially launched on May 27, 2026.

The second generation M9 is offered in eight exterior colours: Obsidian Black, Spruce Green, Warm Cloud White, Ocean Silver Blue, Sailing Green, Desert Gold Brown, Golden Red, and Yardang Gold Black, the last of which is exclusive to the M9 Ultimate variant. Two seating configurations are available: a five-seat layout (Chinese: 阔五座) and a six-seat layout (Chinese: 享六座). The exterior of the BEV version has a drag coefficient of 0.249C_{d}, while the EREV version is 0.26C_{d}.

It is offered in two trim levels, Max+ and Ultra. On launch, the M9 Max+ was priced from 479,800 yuan (489,800 yuan for six-seat version) and the M9 Ultra from 539,800 yuan (549,800 yuan for six-seat version).

The range features a redesigned HarmonyOS cockpit with the Celia intelligent assistant, a 360° viewing system, full-colour display, HUAWEI SOUND Ultimate audio (39 speakers standard, 43 in the M9 Ultimate), Single-lens dual-focal-plane AR-HUD, ALPS Healthy cockpit 3.0, Split-screen projection giant screen and a full-colour intelligent lighting projection system. It is the first HIMA 9-Series model to feature the Tuling Longxing fully active chassis platform, its architecture adopts a 6-in-1 full-domain integrated architecture and is equipped with 800V fully active suspension capable of 111 mm (4.4 in) of height adjustment and 400 mm/s (15.7 in/s) wheel response with 11,451 N (2,574 lbf; 1,168 kgf) of peak force, steer-by-wire including 8° of rear-wheel steering, and Road Preview System 2.0. a Gemini dual-redundant architecture with over 30 redundancy designs, Huawei DriveONE dual silicon carbide electric drive system, and the Jujing battery platform. The range also introduces HUAWEI ADS 5, Huawei Xinghe Communications 2.0 and vehicle-to-vehicle (V2V) wireless communication.

The second generation M9 Series carries six LiDAR sensors, comprising forward dual-redundant lidar and an omnidirectional four-sensor solid-state lidar matrix. the second generation M9 Series is also equipped with an omnidirectional stereo fusion perception system, which consists of one 896-line dual-optical-path image-level LiDAR, one in-cabin LiDAR, four high-precision solid-state LiDARs, three distributed 4D millimeter-wave radar matrices, two 4D millimeter-wave angular radars, twelve ultrasonic radars, eleven high-definition cameras, and six external microphones.

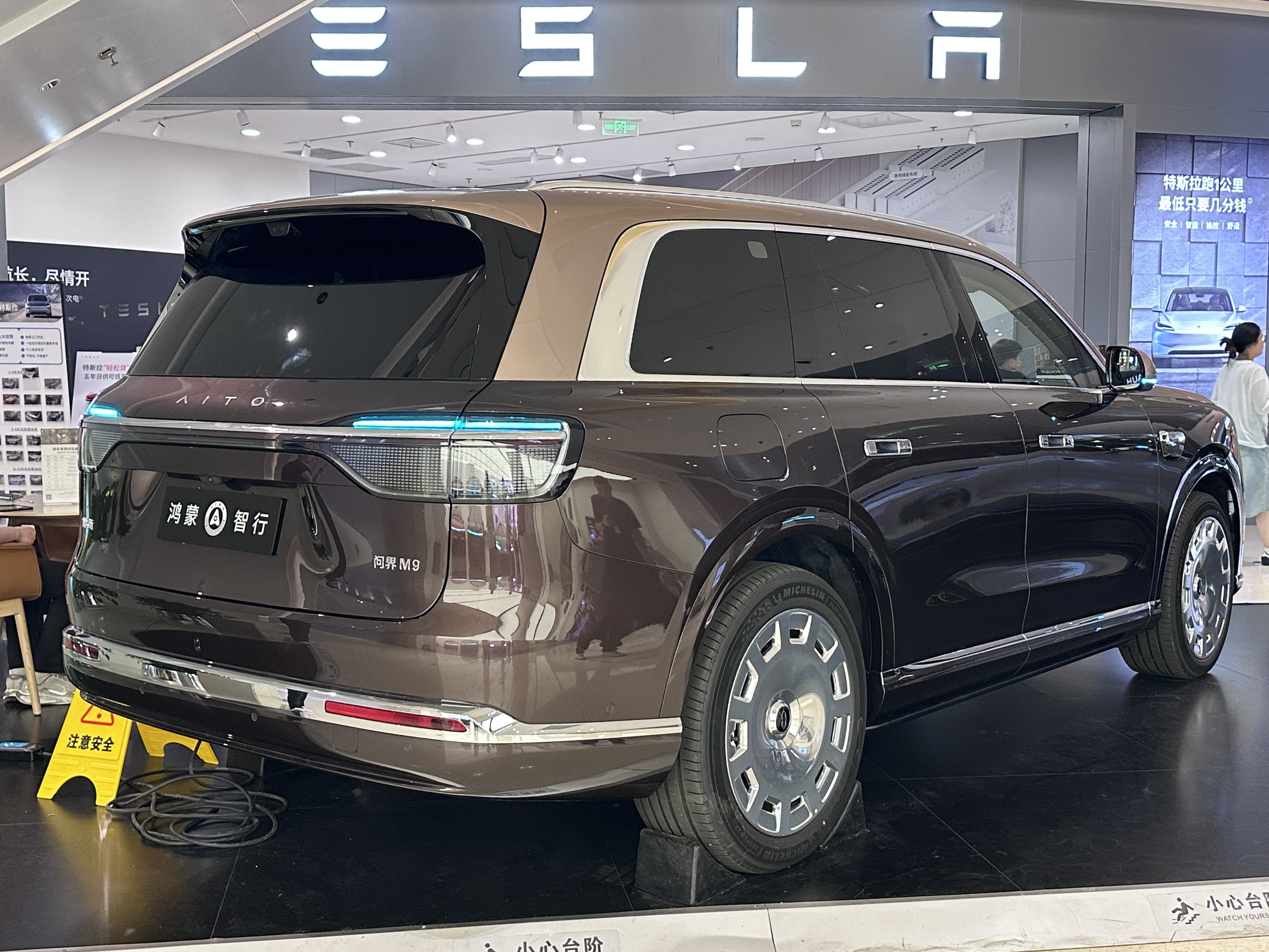
Rear view

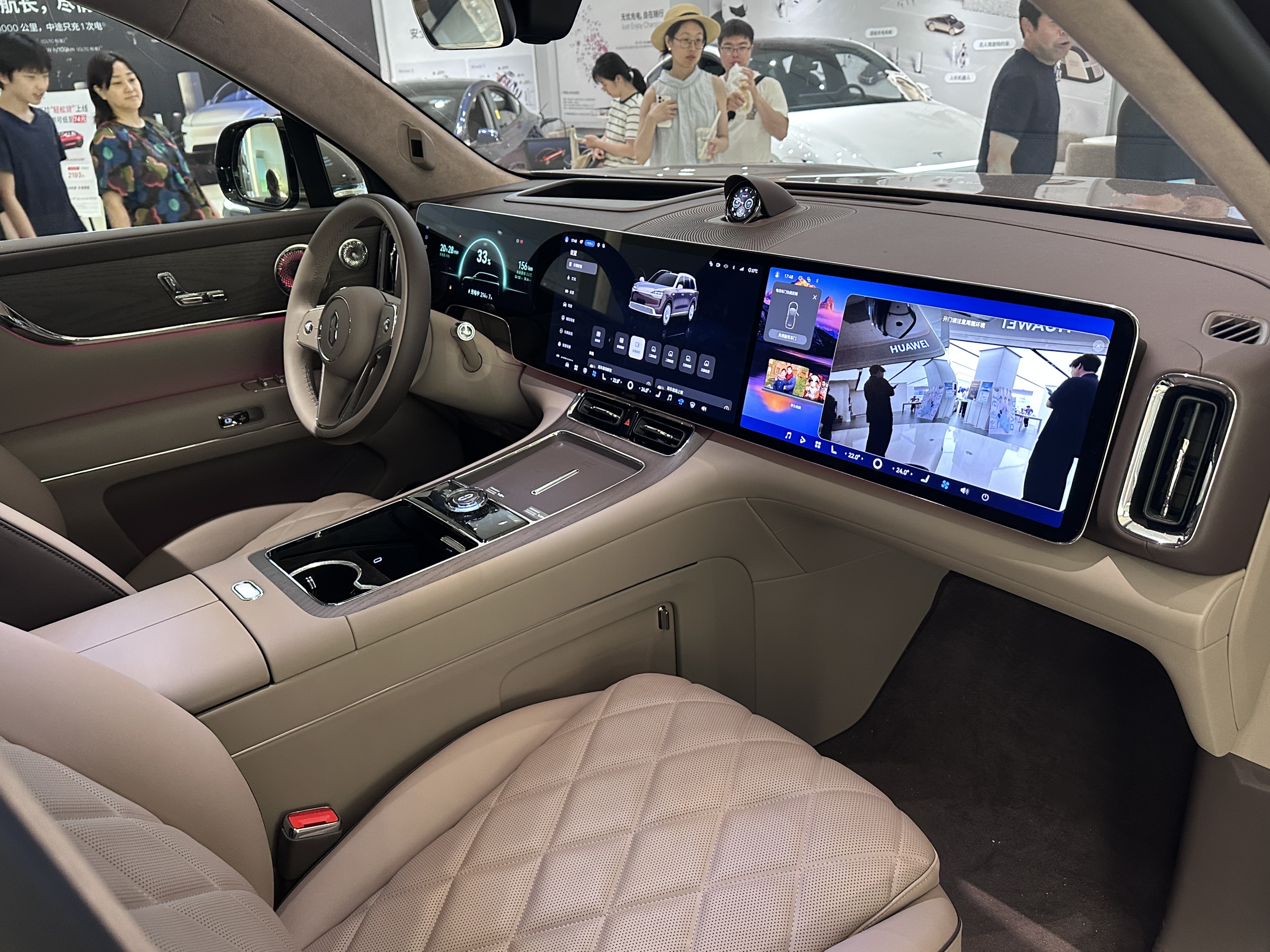
Interior

=== M9 Ultimate ===
At the HIMA Spring New Product Launch Conference on April 22, 2026, HIMA announced the AITO M9 Ultimate (Chinese: 问界M9 Ultimate 领世加长版), an extended-wheelbase variant based on second generation, with pre-sales opening at 669,800 yuan.It was launched on May 27, 2026 at a starting price of 649,800 yuan for the M9 Ultimate 5-seat version and 659,800 yuan for the M9 Ultimate 6-seat version and Deliveries began on 12 September.

The M9 Ultimate has a 111 mm (4.4 in) longer wheelbase of 3,236 mm (127.4 in) and a 117 mm (4.6 in) longer length of 5,402 mm (212.7 in). It is distinguished by an exclusive two-tone exterior finish, and it features a floating backlit logo and exclusive Ultimate lettering on the pedals, side pillars, and rear. It is powered by an extended-range electric drivetrain (EREV) with a three-motor system and a 2.0T range extender engine, or the same dual-motor electric as the standard M9. Chassis features includes full steer-by-wire and dual-chamber active suspension. The rear cabin is configured with four zero-gravity reclining seats, an intelligent rotating seat, Hysoft seat material, central air supply massage, wraparound privacy dimming glass, and an intelligent starry sky canopy.

=== Powertrain ===
Drivetrain
Model	Battery		Gasoline engine		Power output			Electric range		30–80% charge time	0–100 km/h (62 mph)	Top speed	Kerb weight
Model	Type	Weight	Type	Power	Front	Rear	Total	WLTP	CLTC	30–80% charge time	0–100 km/h (62 mph)	Top speed	Kerb weight
Dual motor EREV	60 kWh NMC CATL	344 kg (758 lb)	HG15T 1.5 L turbo	115 kW (154 hp; 156 PS)	YY67YS210A05; 220 kW (300 hp; 300 PS) induction	YY67TZ210A05; 277 kW (371 hp; 377 PS) PMSM	497 kW (666 hp; 676 PS)	280 km (174 mi)	340 km (210 mi)	15 min	4.5 sec	220 km/h (137 mph)	2,920 kg (6,437 lb)
Dual motor EREV	75.4 kWh NMC CATL	416 kg (917 lb)	HG15T 1.5 L turbo	115 kW (154 hp; 156 PS)	YY67YS210A05; 220 kW (300 hp; 300 PS) induction	YY67TZ210A05; 277 kW (371 hp; 377 PS) PMSM	497 kW (666 hp; 676 PS)	355 km (221 mi)	422 km (262 mi)	15 min	4.6 sec	220 km/h (137 mph)	2,995 kg (6,603 lb)
Tri motor EREV (Ultimate)	75.4 kWh NMC CATL	416 kg (917 lb)	HG20T 2.0 L turbo	130 kW (170 hp; 180 PS)	YY67YS210A05; 220 kW (300 hp; 300 PS) induction	2×222 kW (298 hp; 302 PS) PMSM	664 kW (890 hp; 903 PS)	310 km (193 mi)	378 km (235 mi)	15 min	3.99 sec	251 km/h (156 mph)	3,200 kg (7,055 lb)
Dual motor EV Max+	120 kWh NMC CATL	628 kg (1,385 lb)	—		YY67YS210A05; 220 kW (300 hp; 300 PS) induction	YY67TZ210A05; 277 kW (371 hp; 377 PS) PMSM	497 kW (666 hp; 676 PS)	—	750 km (470 mi)	15 min	4.6 sec	220 km/h (137 mph)	2,945 kg (6,493 lb)
Dual motor EV Ultra	120 kWh NMC CATL	628 kg (1,385 lb)	—		YY67YS210A05; 220 kW (300 hp; 300 PS) induction	YY67TZ210A05; 277 kW (371 hp; 377 PS) PMSM	497 kW (666 hp; 676 PS)	—	715 km (444 mi)	15 min	4.7 sec	220 km/h (137 mph)	3,030 kg (6,680 lb)
Dual motor EV (Ultimate)	120 kWh NMC CATL	628 kg (1,385 lb)	—		YY67YS210A05; 220 kW (300 hp; 300 PS) induction	YY67TZ210A05; 277 kW (371 hp; 377 PS) PMSM	497 kW (666 hp; 676 PS)	—	700 km (430 mi)	15 min	4.9 sec	220 km/h (137 mph)	3,150 kg (6,945 lb)

== Sales ==
On September 25, 2023, pre-orders for the AITO M9 opened. By November 3, 2023, Huawei announced that pre-order volume had exceeded 20,000 units. On March 22, 2024, HIMA announced the M9 had received more than 60,000 firm orders within 86 days of its launch. By June 2024, six months after launch, cumulative M9 sales had exceeded 100,000 units. By December 2024, twelve months after launch, cumulative deliveries had exceeded 200,000 units, which HIMA described as a record for vehicles priced above CN¥ 500,000 (US$69,300).

Pre-orders for the updated 2025 M9 opened on March 6, 2025. The model attracted 3,800 orders within the first hour and 11,000 within six hours. Orders reached 30,000 within a week, 40,000 after 27 days, 50,000 after 43 days, and surpassed 60,000 on May 23, 2025, 64 days after pre-orders opened, making the 2025 M9 the top-selling vehicle in China's above-CN¥ 500,000 segment. Deliveries of the 2025 M9 began on March 30, 2025 and reached 20,000 units within 46 days on 15 May, a figure HIMA described as a record for vehicles in that price bracket.

At a HIMA Technology Launch Conference in March 2026, Yu Chengdong announced that cumulative deliveries of the entire AITO M9 series had exceeded 280,000 units as of March 3, 2026. He stated that M9 delivery volume between January 2024 and January 2026 exceeded the combined deliveries of the BMW X5, BMW X7, Mercedes-Benz GLE and GLS over the same period.

Pre-orders for the second-generation M9 Series opened on April 22, 2026 and attracted over 11,500 orders within one hour. By May 18, 2026, pre-orders had reached 50,000 units, with Yu Chengdong noting that over 40% of customers had selected the M9 Ultimate extended-wheelbase variant, which he described as exceeding internal expectations.

on July 4, 2026, the cumulative delivery volume of the AITO M9 series reached 300,000 units; notably, the second-generation model surpassed 10,000 deliveries in just three weeks, setting a record for the fastest vehicle in the CN¥ 500,000 price range delivery milestone. On 30 September 2026, Aito announced that the second-generation M9 had exceeded 40,000 deliveries in the 16 weeks since its launch, achieving monthly sales exceeding 10,000 units.

On November 2 2026, Aito announced that cumulative deliveries of the M9 Ultimate had reached 5,000 units after 50 days. Aito noted that the average transaction price exceeded CN¥ 700,000 (~US$105,000), and that 50% of consumers were in the 3544 age range, 82% are entrepreneurs or executives, and 66% have an annual post-tax income exceeding CN¥ 1,000,000 (~US$150,000).

AITO M9 annual sales in China
Year	China		
Year	EREV	Battery electric	Total
2024	139,512	16,539	156,051
2025	103,670	13,464	117,134

== See also ==
- Harmony Intelligent Mobility Alliance
