= Seres Group =

Chinese vehicle manufacturer

Seres Group Co., Ltd
- Native name: 赛力斯集团股份有限公司
- Formerly: Sokon Group
- Type: Public
- Traded as: SSE: 601127; SEHK: 9927
- Industry: Automotive; Production systems
- Predecessors: Chongqing Baxian Fenghuang Electronic Factory (1986-1996); Chongqing Yu'an Shock Absorber Company (1996-2007); Chongqing Sokon Automobile (2007-2022)
- Founded: September 1986; 40 years ago
- Founders: Zhang Xinghai (张兴海)
- Headquarters: Chongqing, China
- Area served: Worldwide
- Key people: Zhang Xinghai (Chairman & Founder); Yin Xiangzhi (President)
- Products: Automobiles, Motorcycle, commercial vehicles, auto parts
- Revenue: ▲US$12,485,977 (2023)
- Net income: US$72,136
- Total assets: ▼US$11,339,223 (2023)
- Owners: Chongqing Sokon Holding (founder Zhang's family) (26.53%); Dongfeng Motor Corporation (21.68%); Chongqing Yu'an Automotive Industrial (government of Chongqing) (4.38%)
- Number of employees: 13,238
- Subsidiaries: Seres; Seres Hubei; XGJAO Motorcycle; Yu'an Shock Absorber Company; Jinkang New Energy; Ruichi Automobile
- Website: official website

Seres Group (赛力斯集团股份有限公司) (previously known as Sokon Group or Chongqing Sokon Industry Group Co., Ltd, 重庆小康工业集团股份有限公司) is a Chinese automotive manufacturer founded in September 1986 with headquarters in Chongqing, China. Born as a manufacturer of components for household appliances and shock absorbers, it currently produces electric cars, ICEs cars, motorcycles and commercial vehicles as well as shock absorbers and internal combustion engines. In 2022, the company renamed to Seres Group from Sokon Group. It operates through its subsidiaries Seres, Seres Hubei, XGJAO Motorcycle and Yu'an Shock Absorber Company.

While Chinese automotive manufacturers are either state-owned or privately owned, Seres shareholders include private investors as well as a local government entity and a state-owned company.

The name Seres is derived from the Ancient Greek word "Σῆρες" which means "China".

== History ==
The forerunner of the Sokon Group was Chongqing Baxian Fenghuang Electronic Factory (重庆巴县凤凰电器弹簧厂), a company founded in September 1986 by Zhang Xinghai and other shareholders, mainly engaged in the manufacture and sale of Japanese-licensed components for household appliances and springs for automotive seats. The products were destined for both the Chinese and Japanese markets and quickly achieved a market share in the sector of 90%. In September 1996, the Chongqing Yu'an Shock Absorber Company was founded, marking the establishment of a new plant dedicated to producing shock absorbers for cars and motorcycles. The plant quickly reached its peak production capacity, exceeding 1.5 million units per year. Subsequently, the company underwent a name change to Chongqing Yu'an Innovation Technology (Group).

Given the sales numbers of components, Chongqing Yu'an decided to enter directly into the automotive and motorcycle production sector by entering into agreements with both Japanese and Chinese manufacturers to create the new range of vehicles.

In July 2002, XGJAO Motorbyke was founded, a manufacturer of low cost sports motorcycles intended mainly for a young audience and the first models on the market were launched (the F4 followed in the following years by the F5, F6 and F7).

For the automotive production, an agreement was signed with Suzuki for the licensed supply of chassis and engines for microvans and small commercial vehicles and on 27 June 2003, the new Dongfeng Yu'an Automobile 50:50 joint venture with headquarters in Chongqing and assembly plant in Wuhan was founded together with Dongfeng Motor Corporation. Subsequently, an engineering center for the design of electric vehicles called Chongqing Ruichi Automobile Company was created.

In 2005 the first vehicle of the joint venture went into production at the Dongfeng plant in Wuhan: the microvan Dongfeng Yu'an K-Series which was also exported abroad (including Europe).

In May 2007 the entire industrial group changed its name to Chongqing Sokon Automobile Co., Ltd; the Yu'an brand was kept only to identify the production of shock absorbers and components, the Dongfeng Yu'an brand present on the minivans thus became Dongfeng Sokon (abbreviated to DFSK in overseas markets). In May 2012, the millionth vehicle of the Dongfeng Sokon joint venture was produced.

On 15 June 2016, the Sokon group was listed on the Shanghai Stock Exchange. In the same year, the first SUV-type vehicles, resulting from the joint venture with the Dongfeng group called DFSK Glory 580, went into production. In addition, the start-up SF Motors was founded in Santa Clara, California, with the intention of producing electric vehicles. SF Motors purchased AM General's manufacturing facility and opened three development and design centers for electric vehicles (one in California, one in Michigan and one in Chongqing).

In November 2018, the group restructured, with Sokon acquiring Dongfeng's share in the joint venture for 621 million euros, becoming sole owner of DFSK. In exchange, Dongfeng acquired 26.1% of Sokon for 620 million euros, becoming its majority shareholder.

In January 2019 an agreement was signed with Huawei for the development of information technologies and software for electric vehicles.

To improve its electric vehicle production, in April 2022 the company signed an agreement with battery maker CATL, which will remain effective until 2026.

Seres actively expanded to export markets with its Seres and DFSK brands, by 2022 its cumulative exports amounted to 500,000 vehicles.

In July 2022, the company name was changed to Seres Group.

In August 2024, Seres Group announced that it would invest in Huawei's subsidiary "Yinwang" (Shenzhen Yinwang Intelligent Technology Co., Ltd.), accounting for 10% of its shares, with a price of RMB 11.5 billion.

In 2024, thanks to the strong sales momentum of new energy vehicles, Seres Group's revenue increased by more than 300%. The company became the fourth new energy vehicle company in the world to turn losses into profits after Tesla, BYD Auto and Li Auto.

== Brands and products ==
=== AITO ===
AITO is a brand Seres Auto collaborates with Huawei for smart electric vehicle. Huawei leads in the design of AITO models while Seres conducts in production. The AITO trademark was owned by Seres but was sold to Huawei in June 2023. In July 2024, Huawei announced the transfer of the English trademarks of AITO and the related patents it holds back to Seres Group at the cost of 2.5 billion RMB.

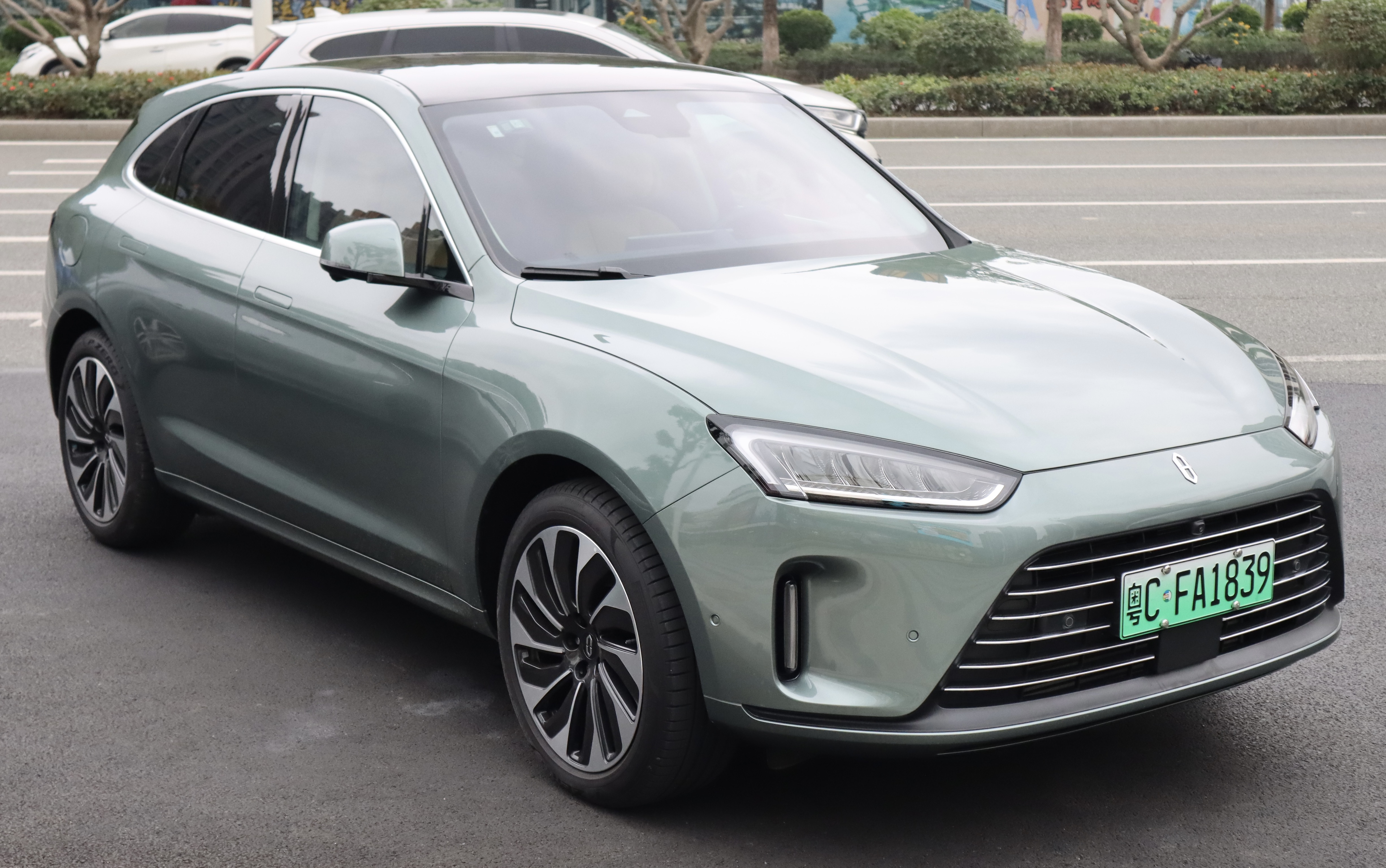
AITO M5

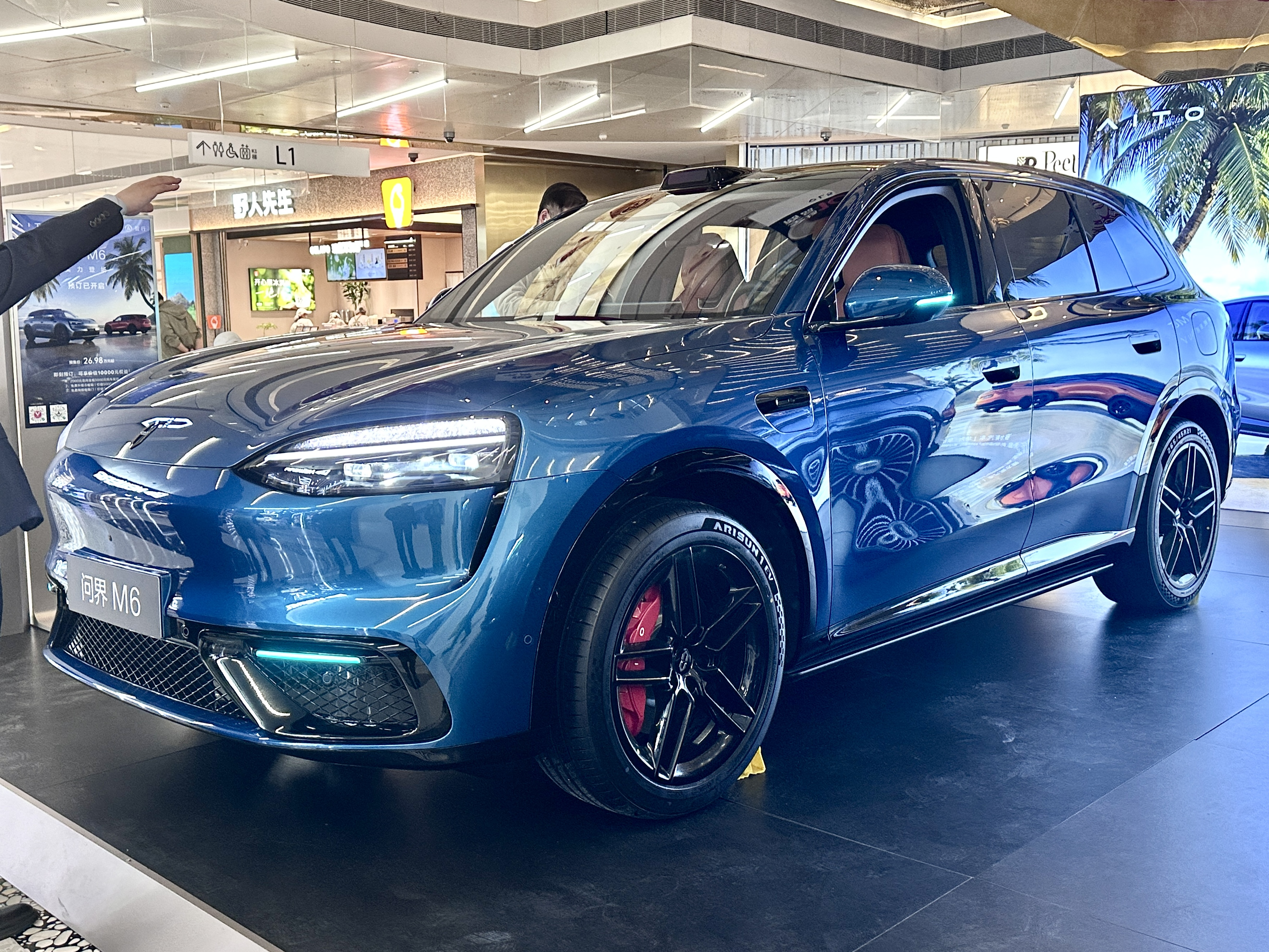
AITO M6

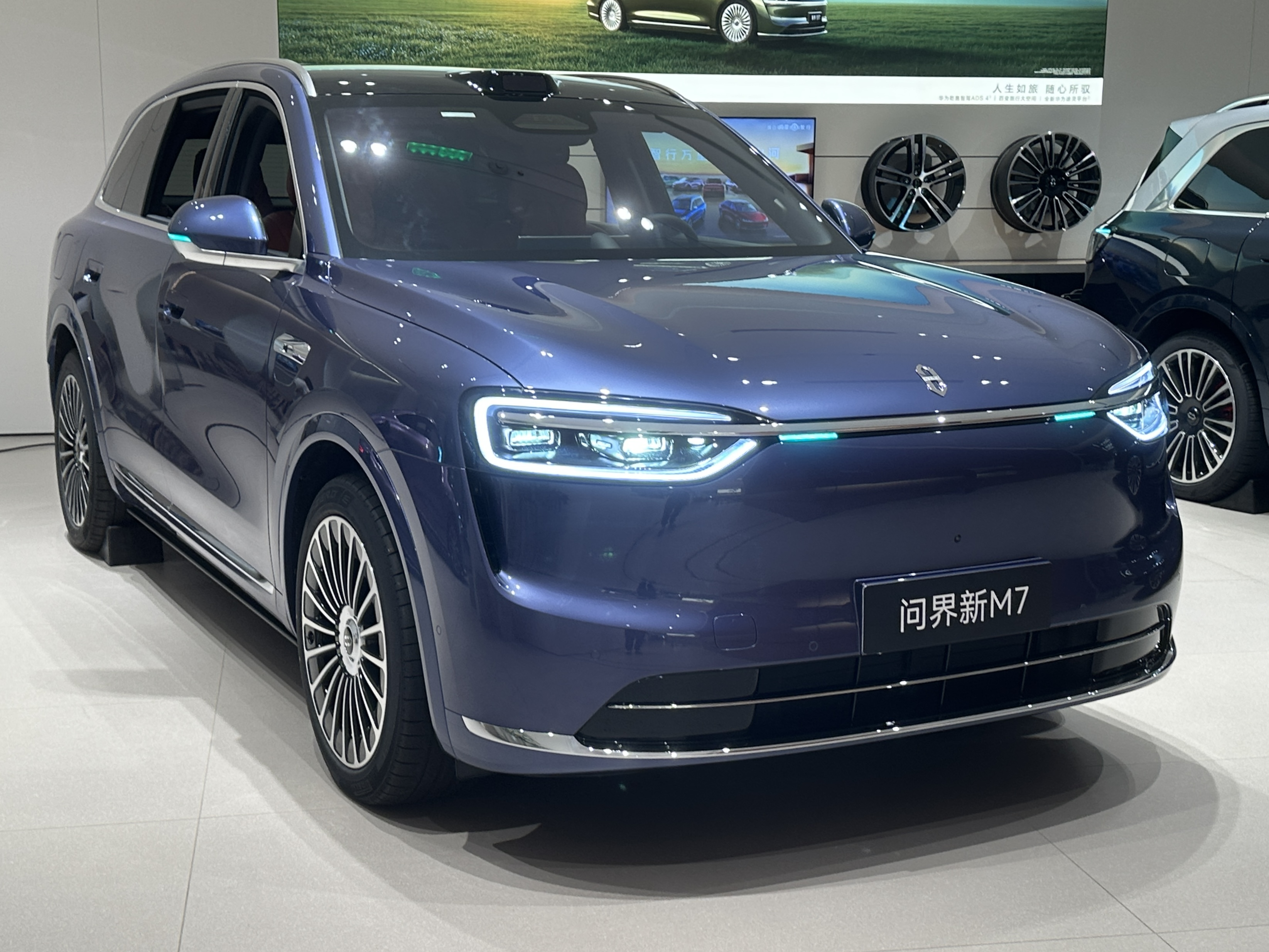
AITO M7

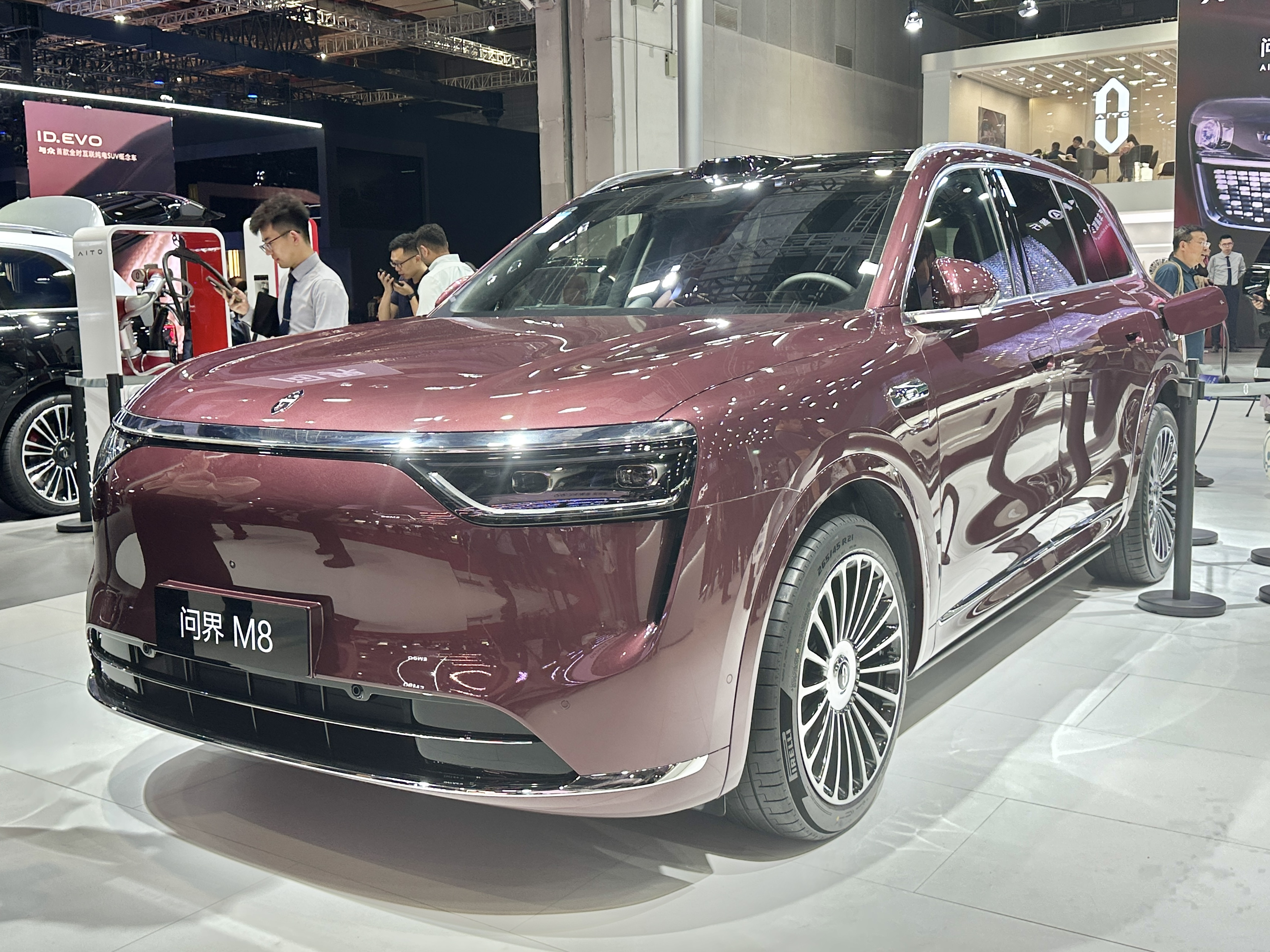
AITO M8

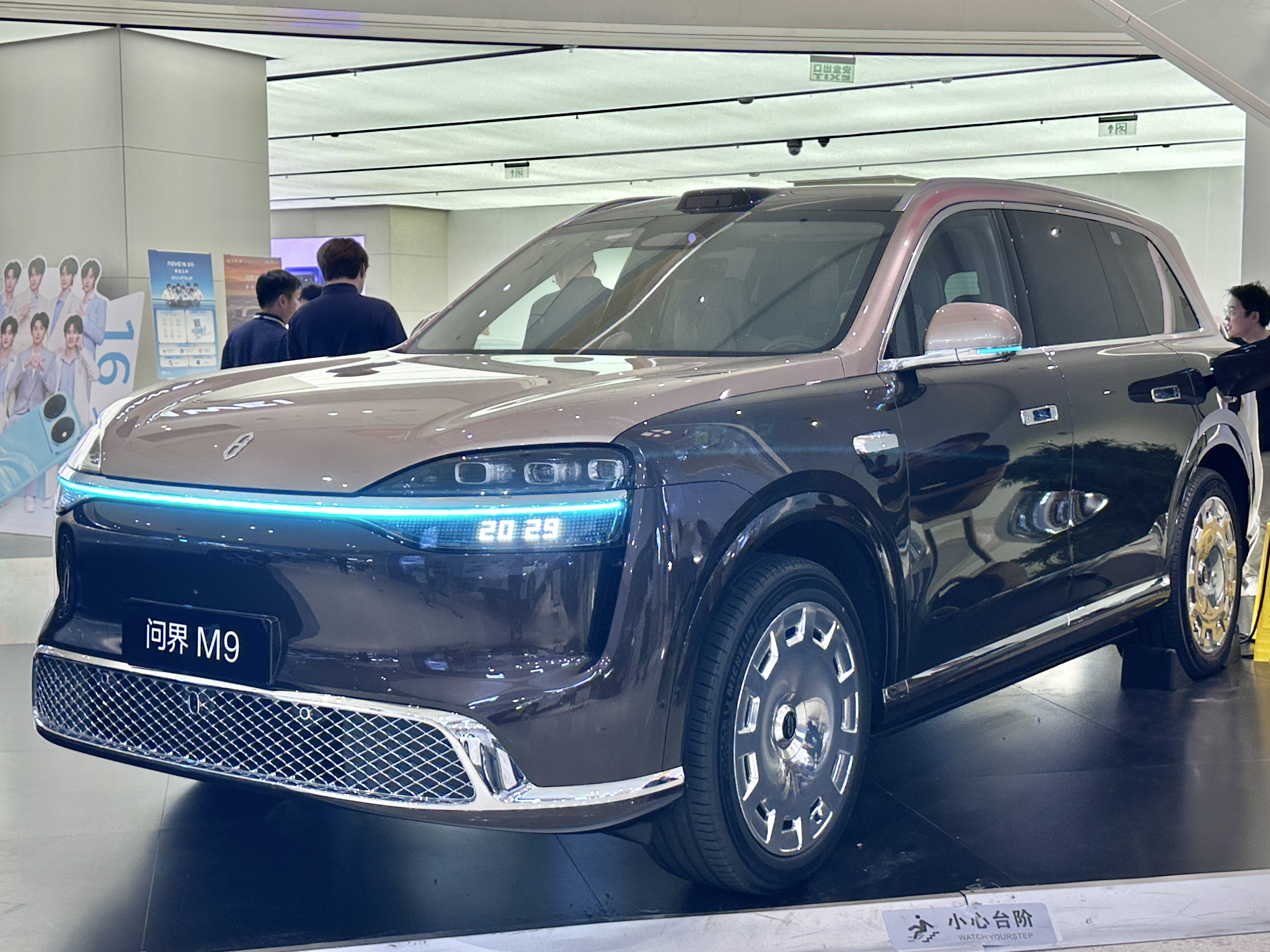
AITO M9

=== Seres ===
Seres is a brand of electric vehicle marketed by Seres Group. Since 2023, Seres brand was shifted to export brand, while AITO became a domestic-only brand.

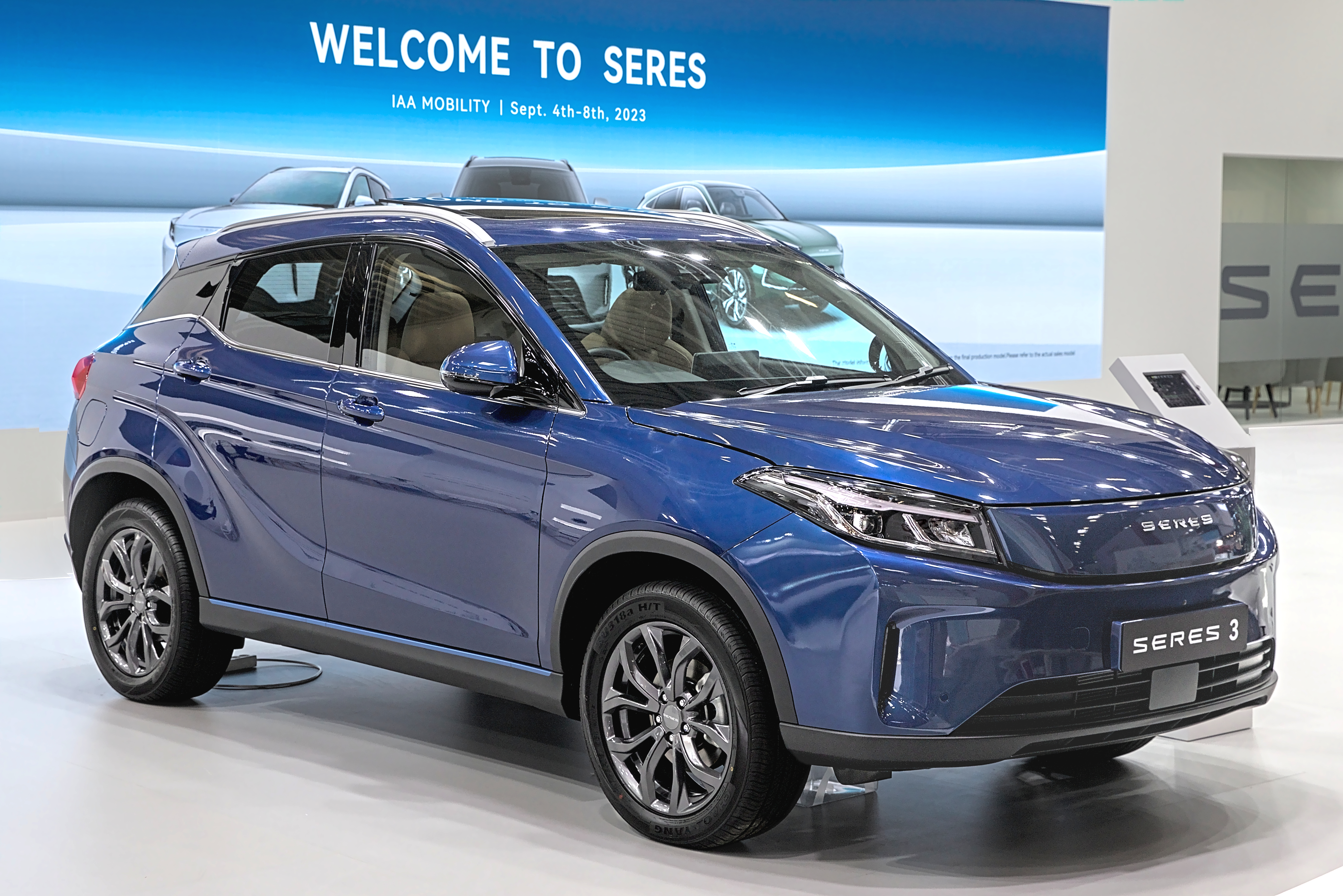
Seres 3

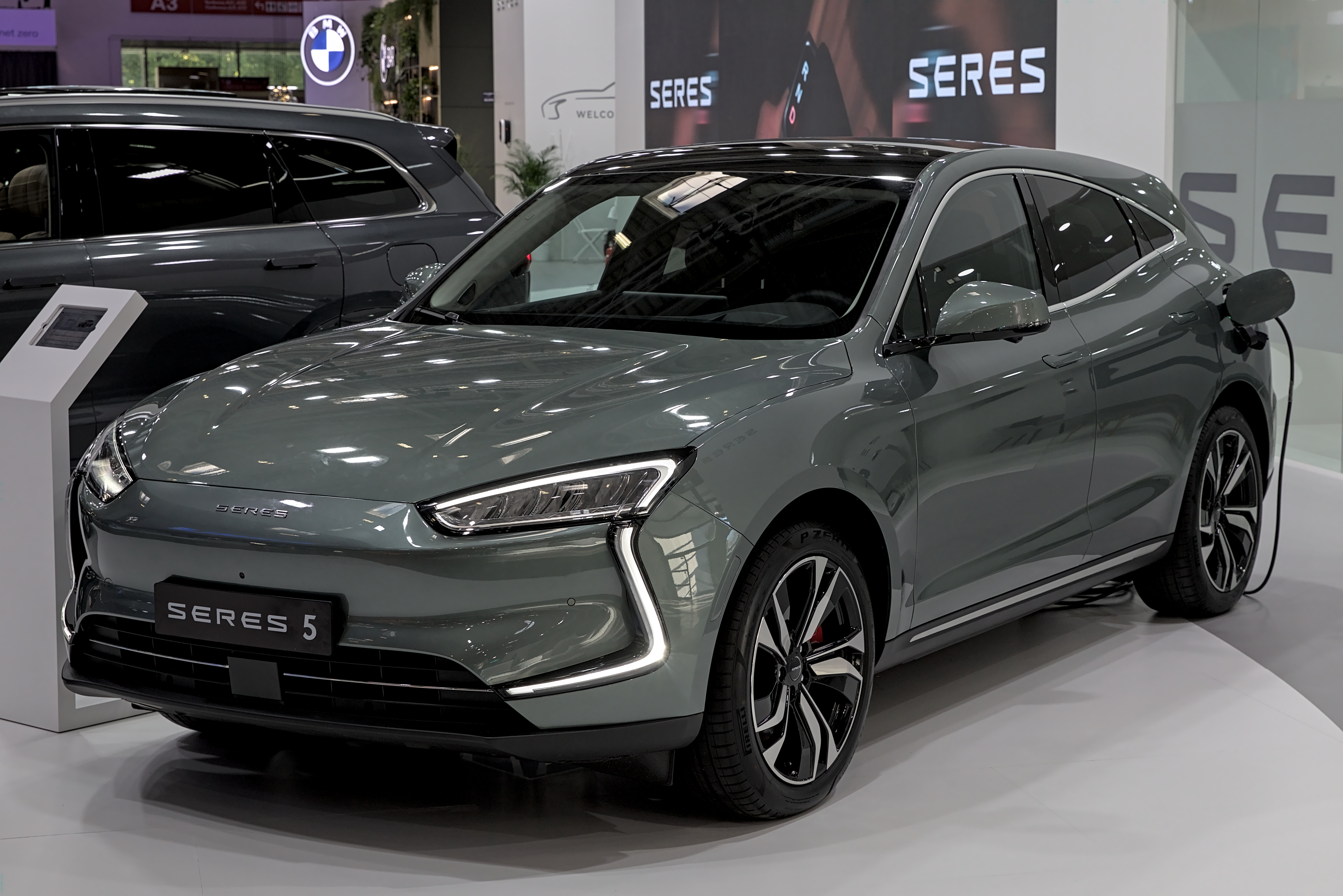
Seres 5

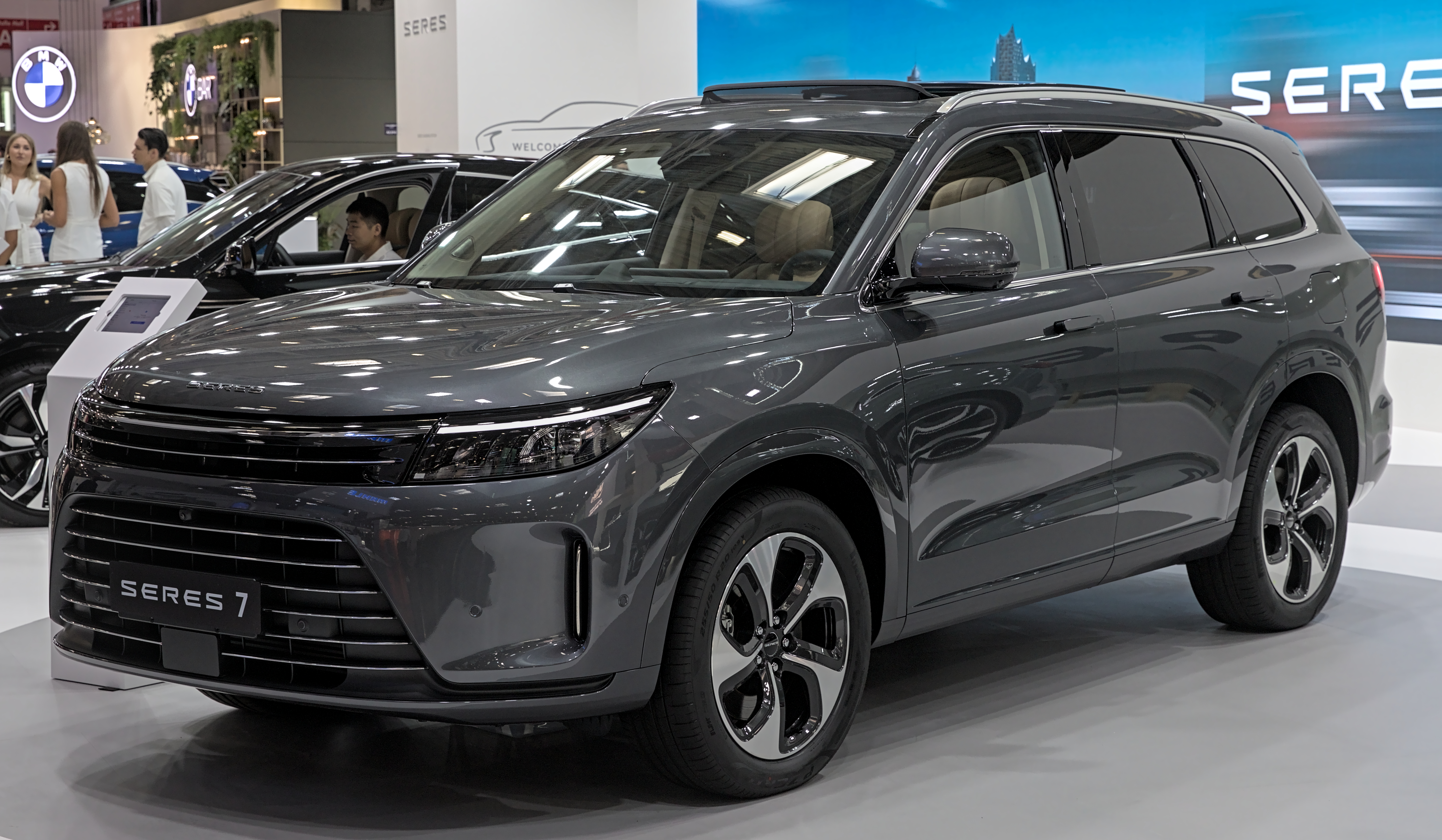
Seres 7

=== Ruichi Automobiles ===
Chongqing Ruichi Automobiles was established in September 2003. The company is a fully funded subsidiary of Seres Group for pure electric commercial vehicles.

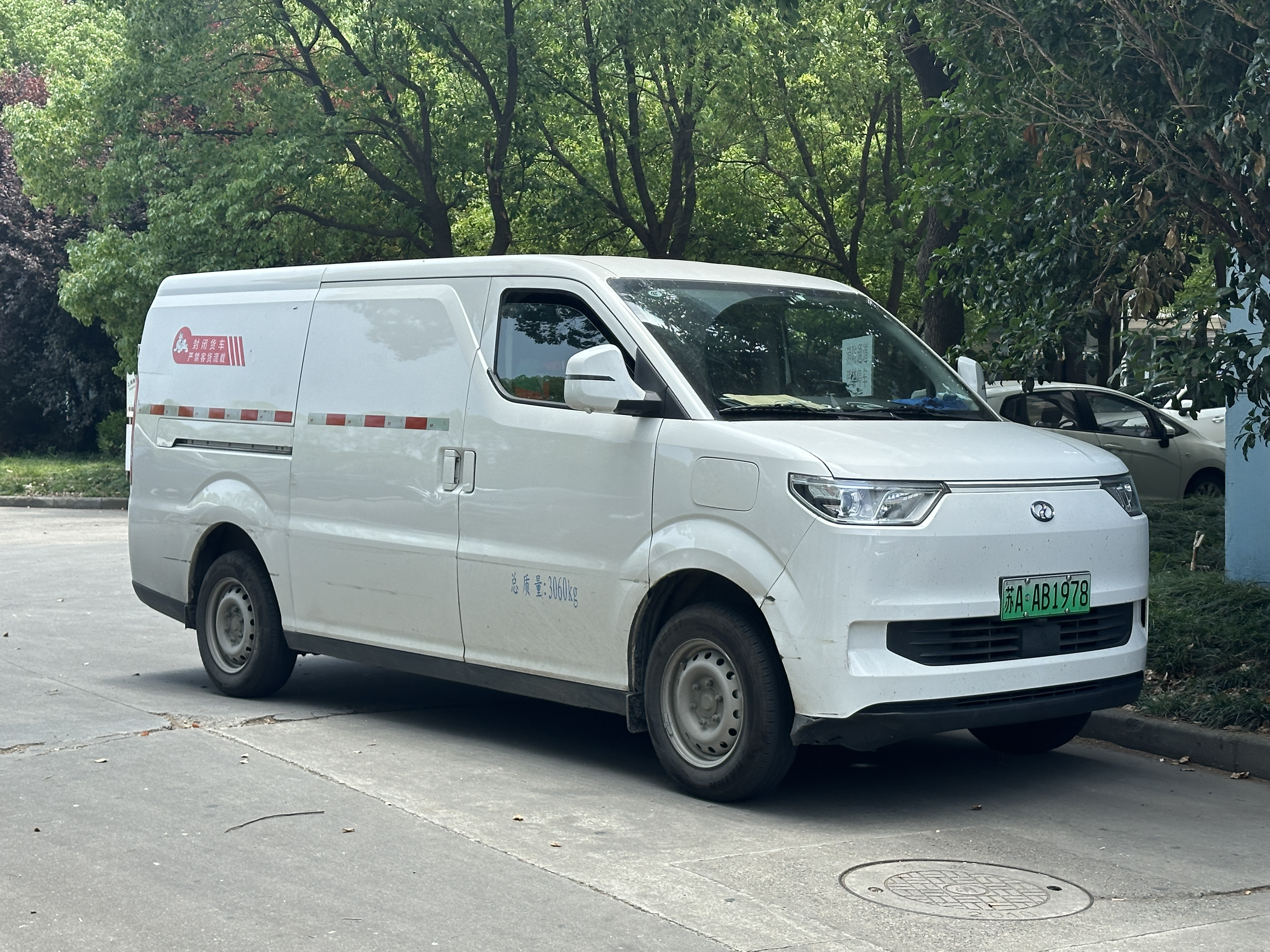
Ruichi EC75

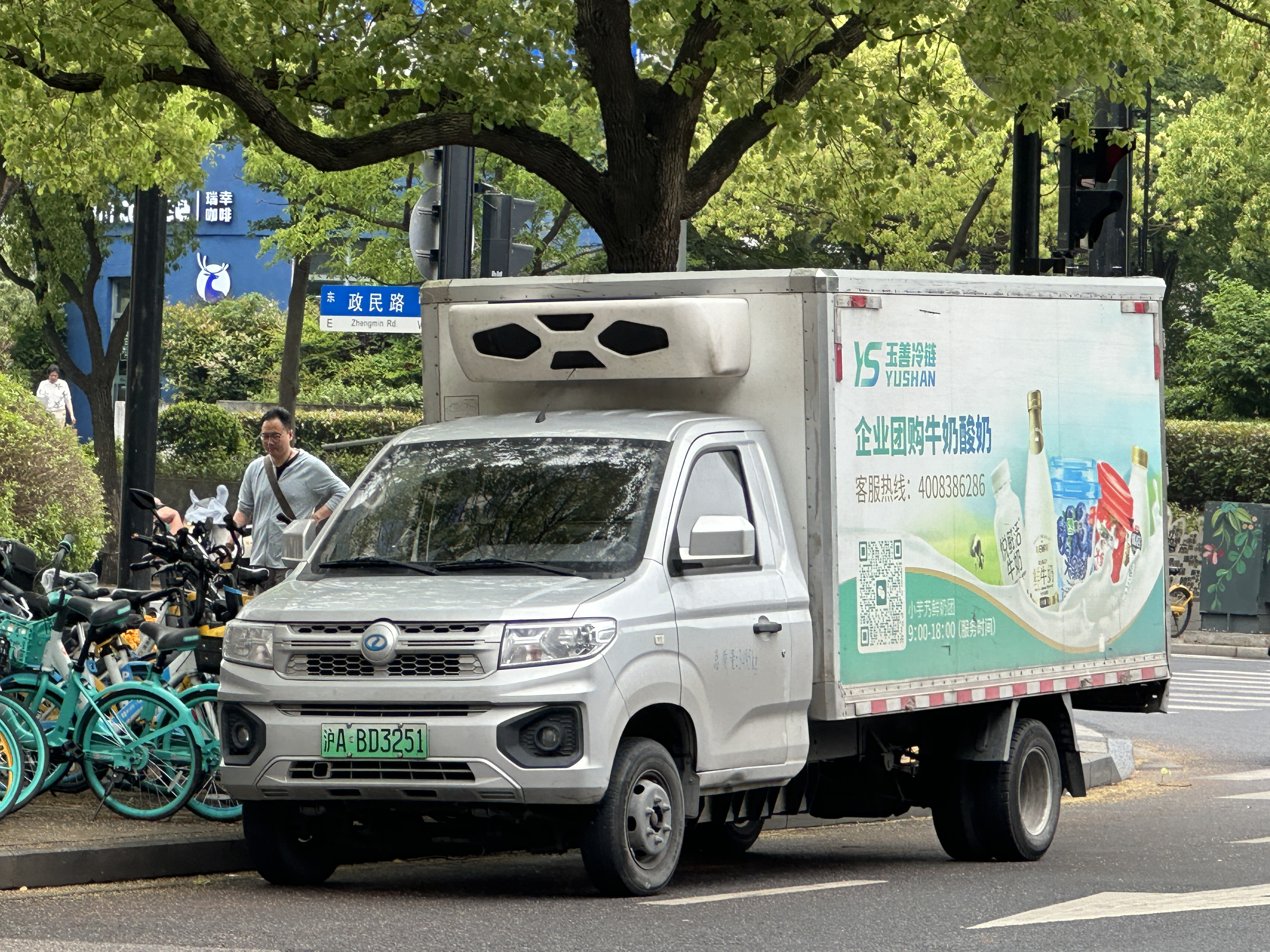
Ruichi ED71

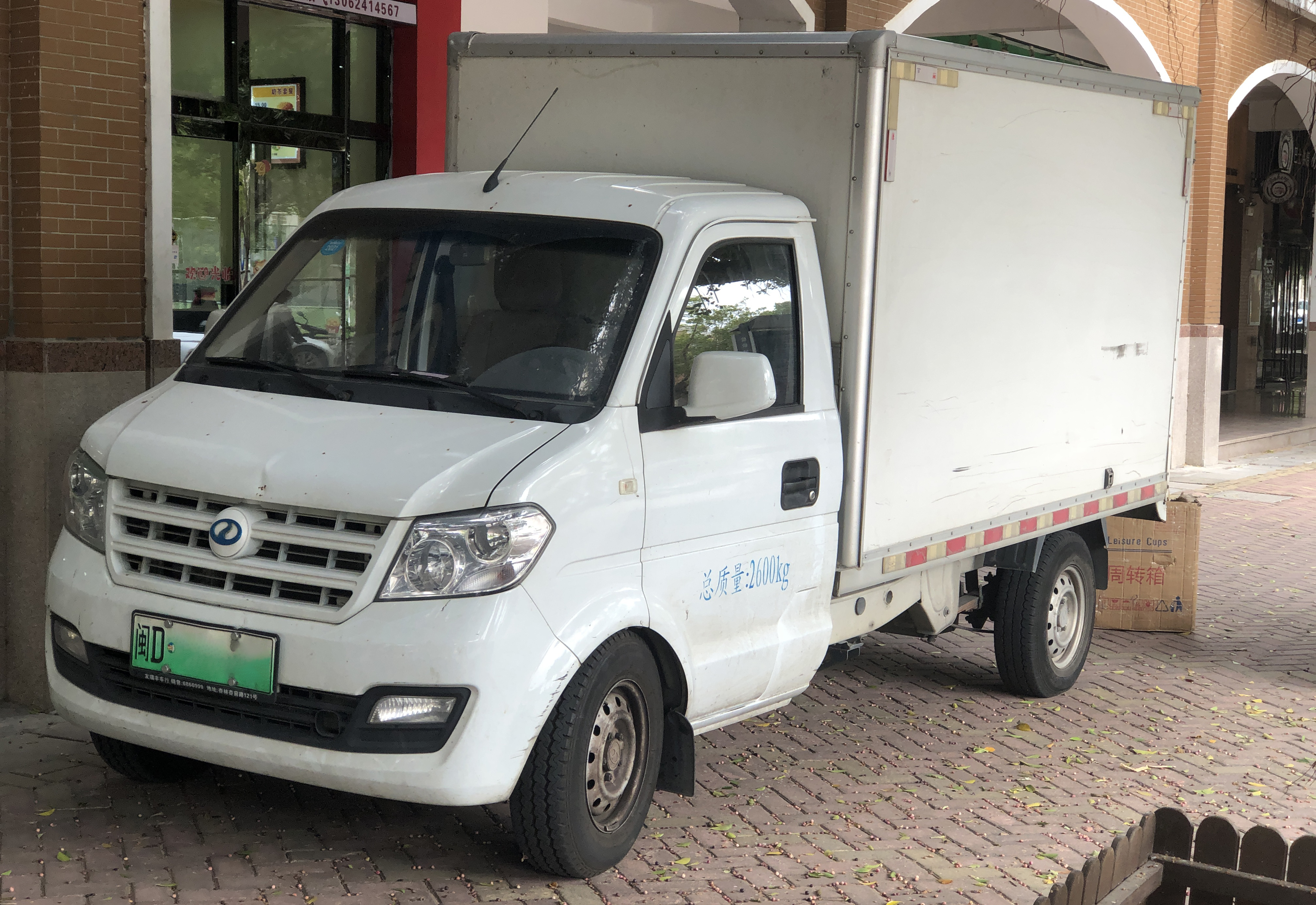
Ruichi EC31

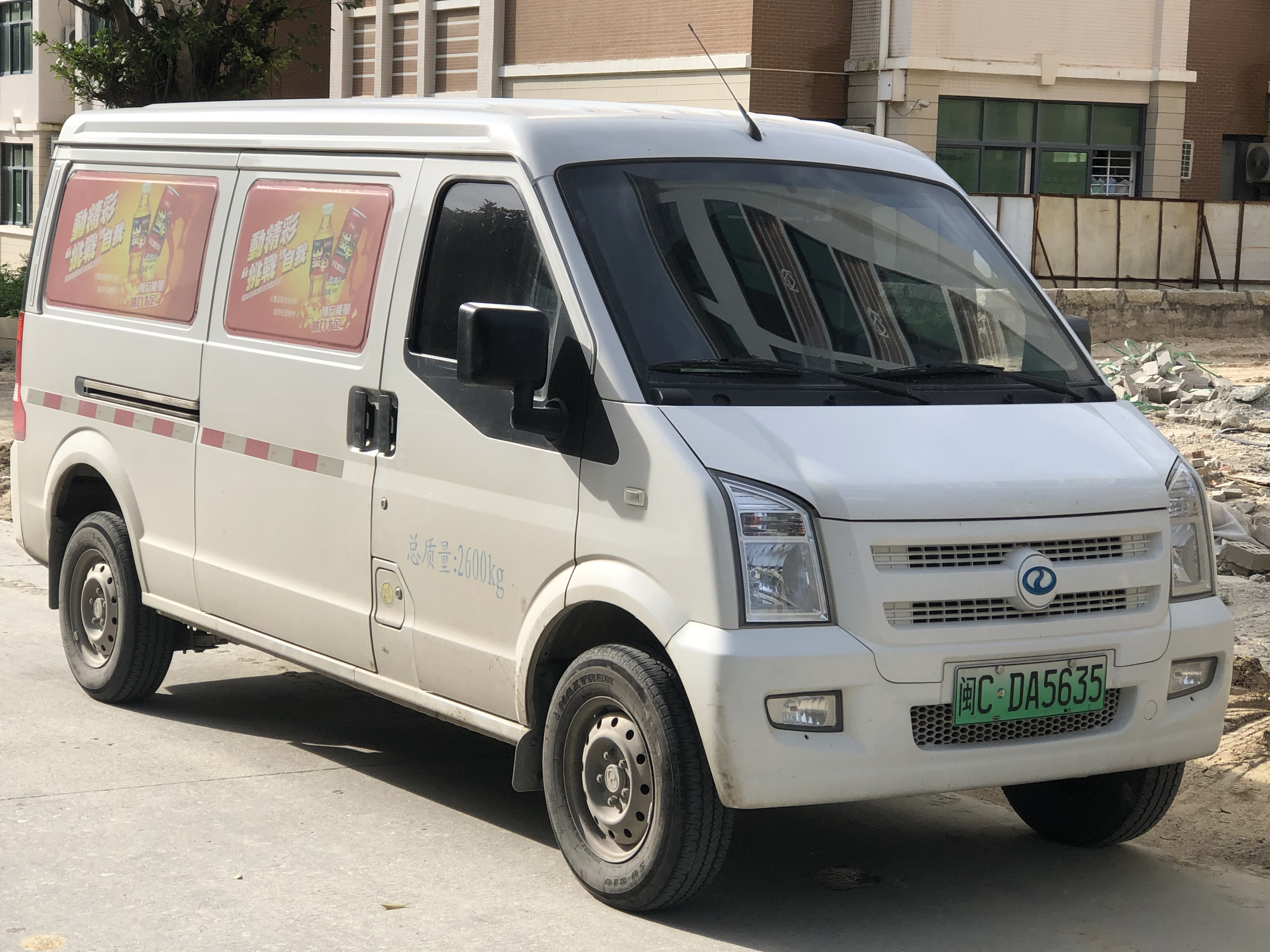
Ruichi EC35

=== Fengon ===
Fengon (or DFSK Glory for foreign markets) formerly known as Dongfeng Fengguang (东风风光), is the brand of Seres that produces passenger vehicles. Established in 2008, Fengon brand targets at affordable compact MPVs and SUVs. It was a joint venture brand with Dongfeng Group until it was fully acquired by Seres Group in 2022.

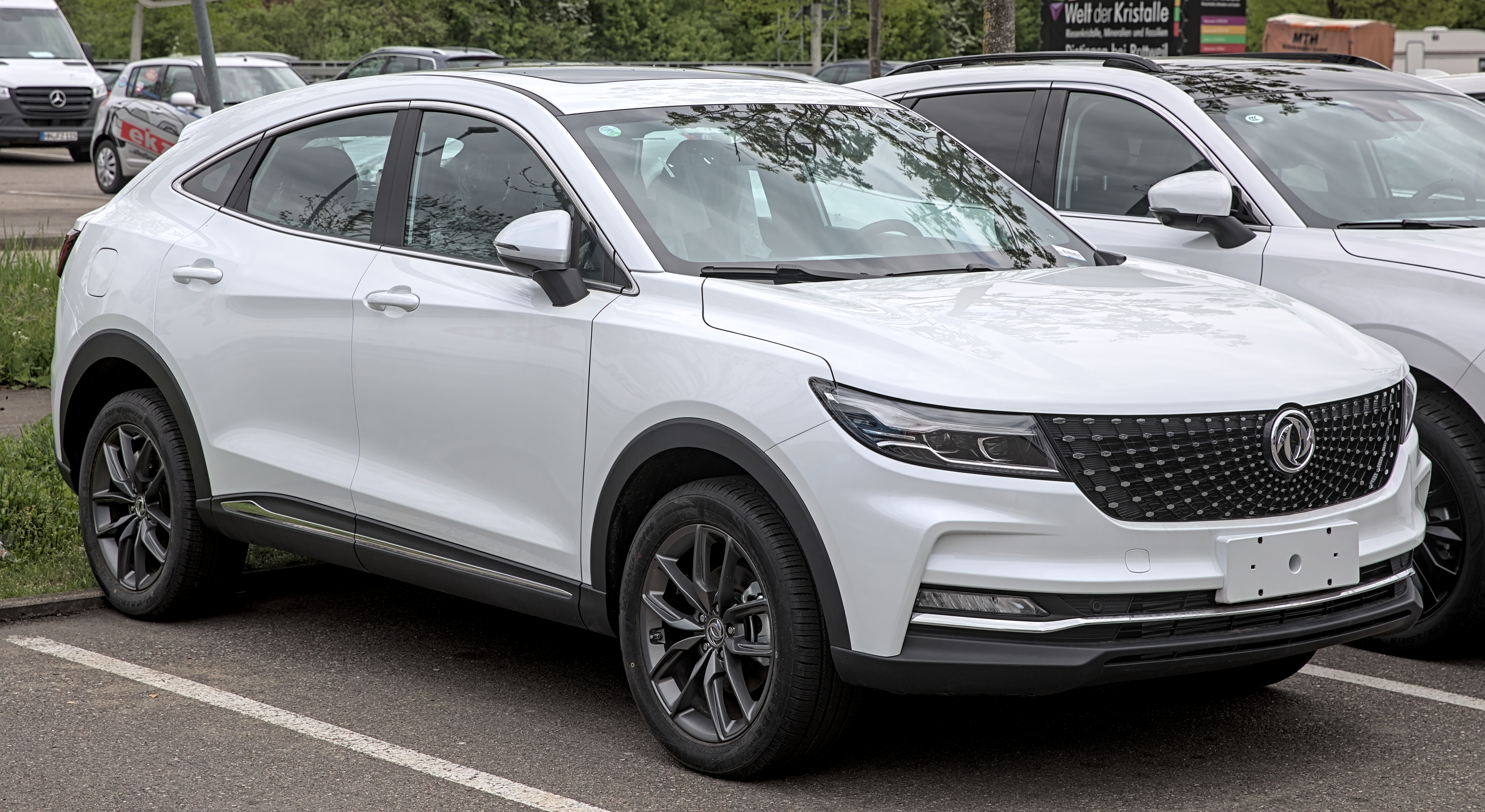
Fengon ix5

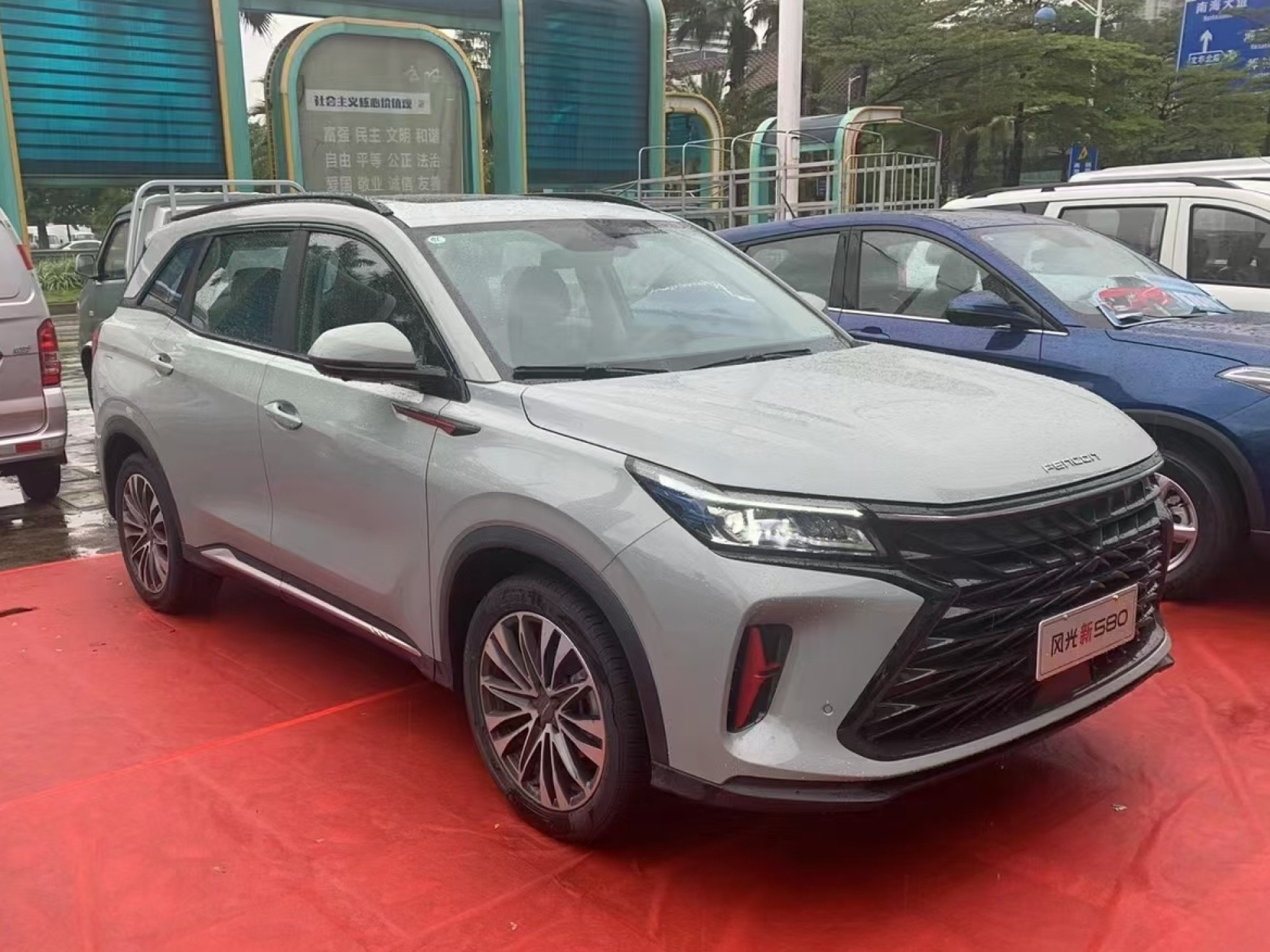
Fengon 580

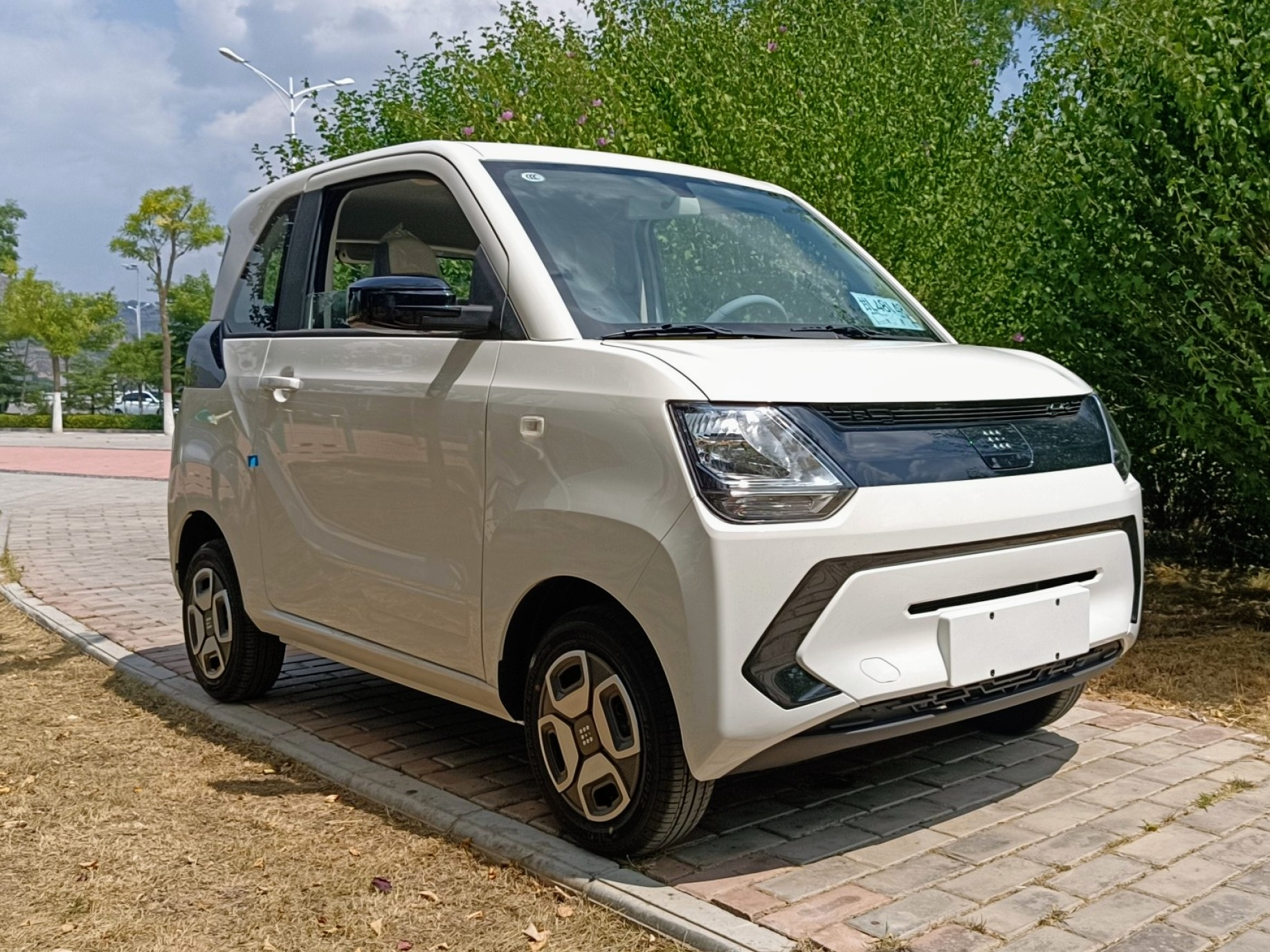
Fengon Mini EV

=== DFSK / Dongfeng Sokon ===
DFSK (short for Dongfeng Sokon) is a brand of Seres that produces light commercial vehicles. It was a joint venture brand with Dongfeng Group until it was fully acquired by Seres Group in 2022.

In October 2023, Dongfeng Sokon Automobile was renamed to Seres Automobile (Hubei).

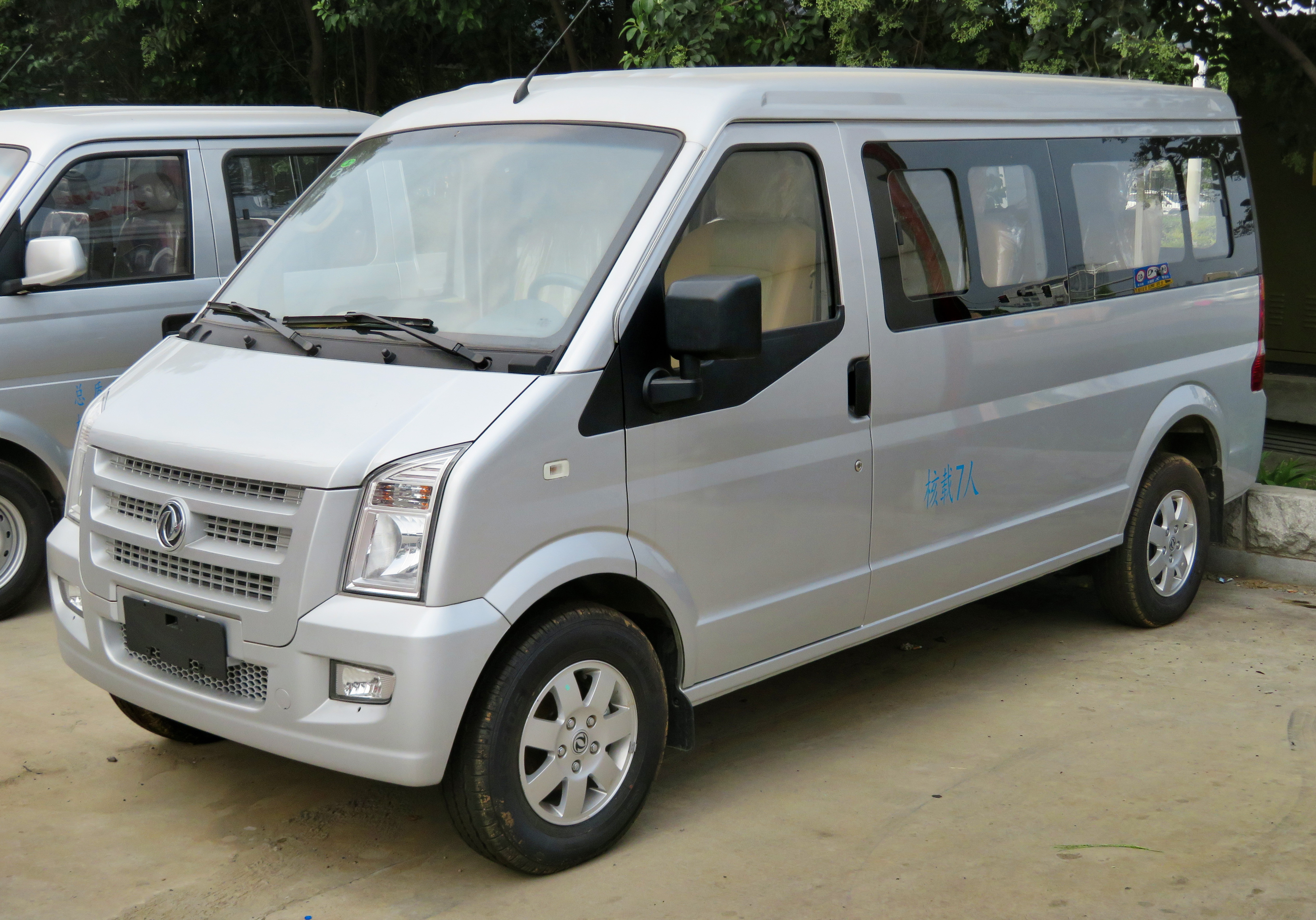
Sokon C-series

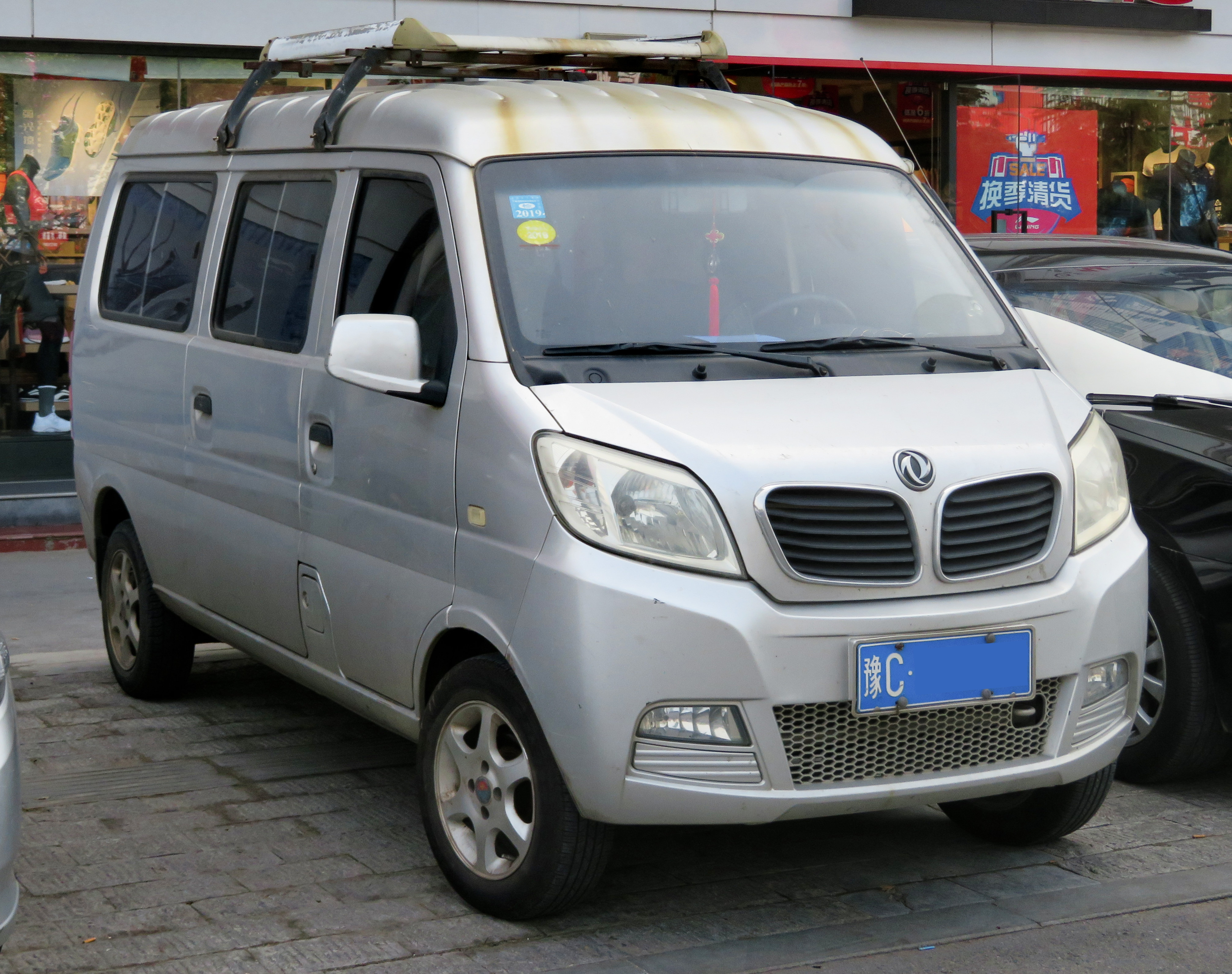
Sokon K-series

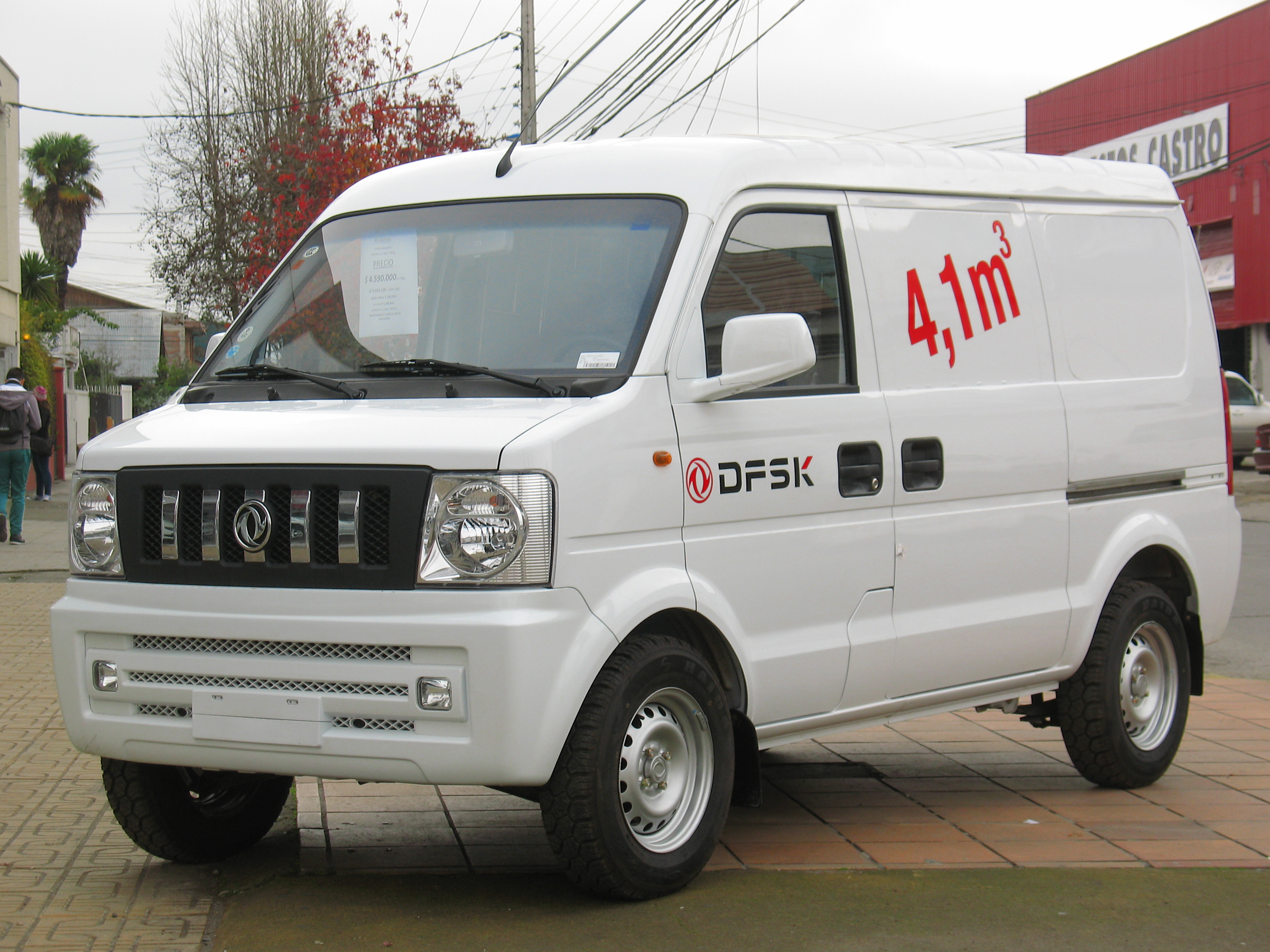
Sokon V-series

== Joint venture ==
=== Saidou Technology (former Landian) ===
Saidou Technology was originally established as a brand of Seres Group called Landian in March 2023, and underwent a major restructuring in 2026, emerging as an independent entity with significant stakes held by the Chongqing municipal government, Seres, CATL. In May 2026, the company was renamed and subsequently launched its new automotive brand, Aiva, in collaboration with ByteDance.

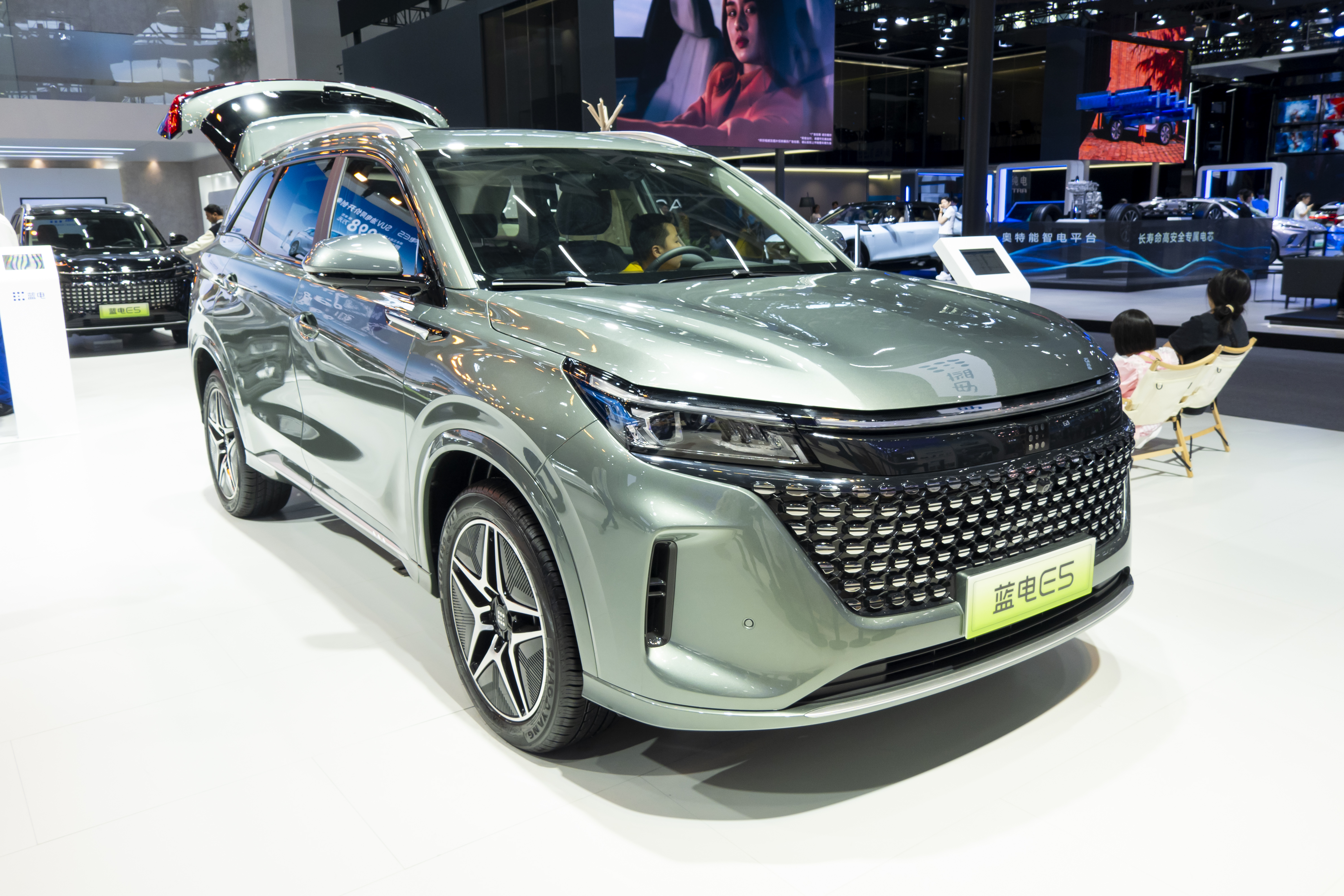
Landian E5

== Sales ==
Seres Group sales
Year	Total	Seres Auto		Seres Hubei		
Year	Total	AITO	Seres	Fengon	DFSK	Landian
2010	226,198	–		226,198		–
2011	243,053	–		243,053		–
2012	202,991	–		202,991		–
2013	205,019	–		205,019		–
2014	277,000	–		277,000		–
2015	275,316	–		161,156	114,160	–
2016	381,636	–		258,997	122,639	–
2017	400,038	–		400,038		–
2018	347,837	–		347,837		–
2019	325,381	–		325,381		–
2020	273,590	–		273,590		–
2021	266,614	8,169		258,445		–
2022	267,246	76,180	3,861	187,205		–
2023	253,181	94,380	12,323	146,478		
2024	497,008	389,419		70,123		
2025	516,860	430,401		44,591		

== See also ==
- Automobile manufacturers and brands of China
- List of automobile manufacturers of China
- Automotive industry in China
