= Seres Auto =

Chinese electric vehicle manufacturer by Seres Group

- Type: Private
- Industry: Automotive; Energy storage
- Founded: January 2016; 10 years ago
- Headquarters: Chongqing, China
- Area served: Worldwide
- Key people: Zhang Zhengping (Chairman); He Liyang (President)
- Number of employees: 168 (2021)
- Parent: Seres Group
- Website: www.global-seres.com

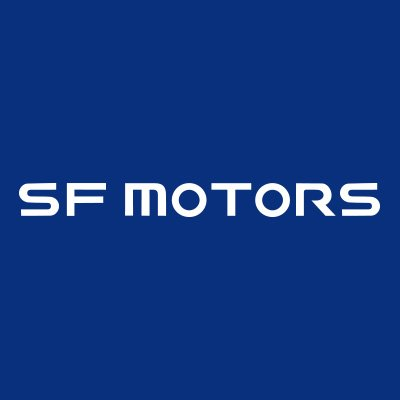
Logo used as SF Motors during 2016-2018

Seres Auto (formerly SF Motors) is an electric vehicle company of Chinese automotive manufacturer Seres Group (formerly Chongqing Sokon Industry Group). Several of the group's subsidiaries are also named "Seres". "Seres" is the Koine Greek word commonly used to refer to Chinese polities in classical times.

Seres Auto Co., Ltd. (Chinese: 赛力斯汽车有限公司) (formerly Chongqing Jinkang New Energy Automobile Co., Ltd.) is a R&D and manufacturing subsidiary based in China.

A US subsidiary, SF Motors Inc., sometimes also called Seres, headquartered in Santa Clara, California, represents Jinkang New Energy Automobile's business in US. SF Motors Inc. has established several R&D facilities and is in the process of designing and producing a U.S.-based, electric vehicle line. The company has delayed launching a US product and laid off hundreds of workers, including 90 people at its design studio. The company is partnering with a number of automotive and tech suppliers.

== In China ==
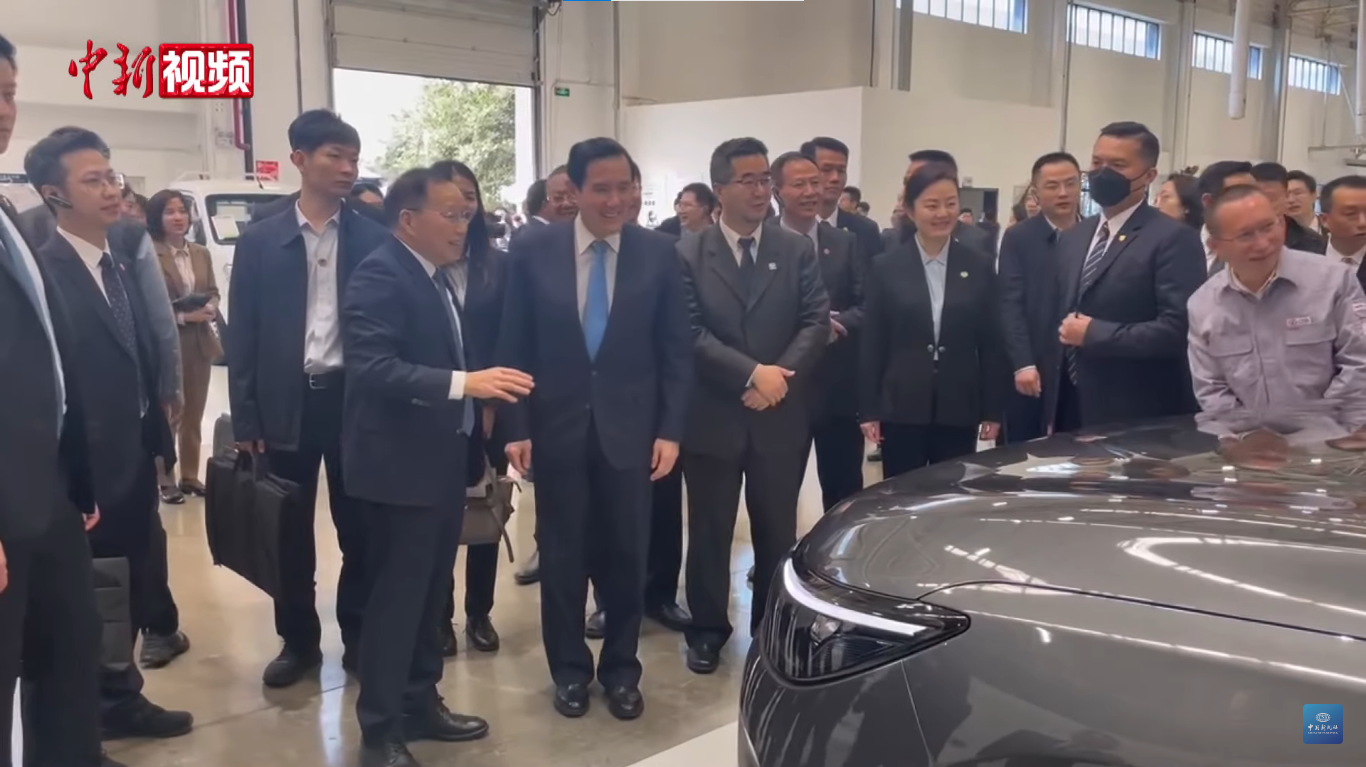
Ma Ying-jeou visit Seres factory in China

=== Timeline ===
- In April 2021, Seres launched an updated SF5, starting a partnership with Huawei, which partook in the development of the vehicle, and sells the cars through Huawei stores. According to sources cited by Reuters, Huawei was looking to take over Seres from its parent company Chongqing Sokon, but Huawei denied having plans for such an acquisition.
- In March 2023, the Aito brand was rebranded as Huawei Aito for a short time before Huawei issued that all promotional materials related to Huawei will be removed on April 1 from Aito stores.

== SF Motors Inc. ==
=== Manufacturing/R&D facilities ===
SF Motors Inc. was founded in Santa Clara, California in January 2016 as a company focused on producing electric vehicles. In early 2017, SF Motors' parent company, Sokon Industry Group, was granted production permits from the Chinese government to produce electric vehicles.

The company has established seven R&D facilities in four countries, including the U.S., China, and Germany, with Japan coming online soon. Along with establishing an R&D center in the Ann Arbor area in Michigan; Seres is also partnering with the University of Michigan's Mcity innovation center, which is dedicated to leading the transformation to connected and automated vehicles. SF Motors hosted its first University of Michigan-Sokon Autonomous Driving Seminar in August 2017.

In 2017, SF Motors completed the acquisition of the AM General Commercial Assembly Plant in Mishawaka, Indiana, making it the only electric vehicle company at the time to have manufacturing facilities in both the U.S. and China. It will be the first manufacturing plant in the U.S. that is wholly owned by SF Motors. The acquisition includes retaining about 430 employees at the facility who previously helped build vehicles for both Mercedes-Benz and Hummer.

=== Timeline ===
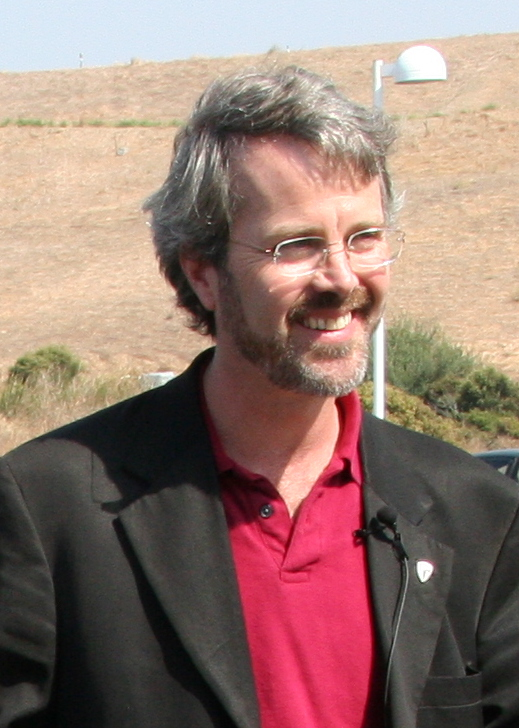
Chief Scientist Martin Eberhard

- January 28, 2016 — SF Motors was founded in Silicon Valley, California
- September 2016 — Tesla co-founder Martin Eberhard joined SF Motors as Strategic Advisor
- January 2017 — Parent company of SF Motors (Sokon Industry Group) granted production permit from Chinese Government to produce electric vehicles
- March 2017 — SF Motors opens headquarters in Silicon Valley. The building has a garage with EV charging stations
- April 2017 — Parent company of SF Motors, Sokon Motors, and University of Michigan announce plans to establish Michigan-Sokon Research Center
- June 2017 — SF Motors announces plans to acquire commercial automotive assembly plant in Mishawaka, Indiana from AM General where Hummer H2 SUVs were formerly built.
- July 2017 — SF Motors hosts first Global Partnership Meeting at its headquarters in Silicon Valley
- July 2017 — SF Motors establishes intelligent driving research center in Beijing
- August 2017 — SF Motors hosts first University of Michigan-Sokon Autonomous Driving Seminar
- September 2017 — SF Motors' parent company granted permission by Chinese Government to issue convertible bond worth up to 1.5 Billion RMB for SF Motors
- October 2017 — SF Motors announced the acquisition of InEVit Inc., an electric vehicle battery modularization startup headed by Martin Eberhard, industry leader and co-founder of Tesla, who joined the company as Chief Scientist and Vice Chairman of SF Motors' Board.
- March 2018 — SF Motors unveils its cars, two all-electric sport utility vehicles, the compact SF5 and the mid-size SF7.
- July 2019 — Plans to assemble the company's first vehicle, an SUV called the SF5, have been halted for the U.S. market. Plans to assemble and sell SF5 in China continue unchanged. Layoffs have been announced at the company's California headquarters.
- That same month, Autocar reported that the company was in search of British partners to manufacture electric vehicles for SF Motors. SF Motors will serve as a supplier and would provide electric motors, and battery packs to any potential partners.

=== Leadership ===
- John Zhang — CEO
- Yifan Tang — CTO

== Products ==
=== Seres ===
Seres is a brand of electric vehicles marketed by Seres Group. Since 2023, Seres brand has shifted to export-focus brand, while AITO and Landian became a domestic-only brand.

- Seres 7/M7 (2024–present), mid-size SUV, rebadged AITO M7
- Seres 5/M5 (2024–present), compact SUV, rebadged AITO M5
- Seres SF5/A5/5 (2019–present), compact SUV
- Seres 3/E3 (2020–present), compact SUV, rebadged Fengon E3
- Seres E1 (2023–present), city car, badge engineered Fengon Mini EV
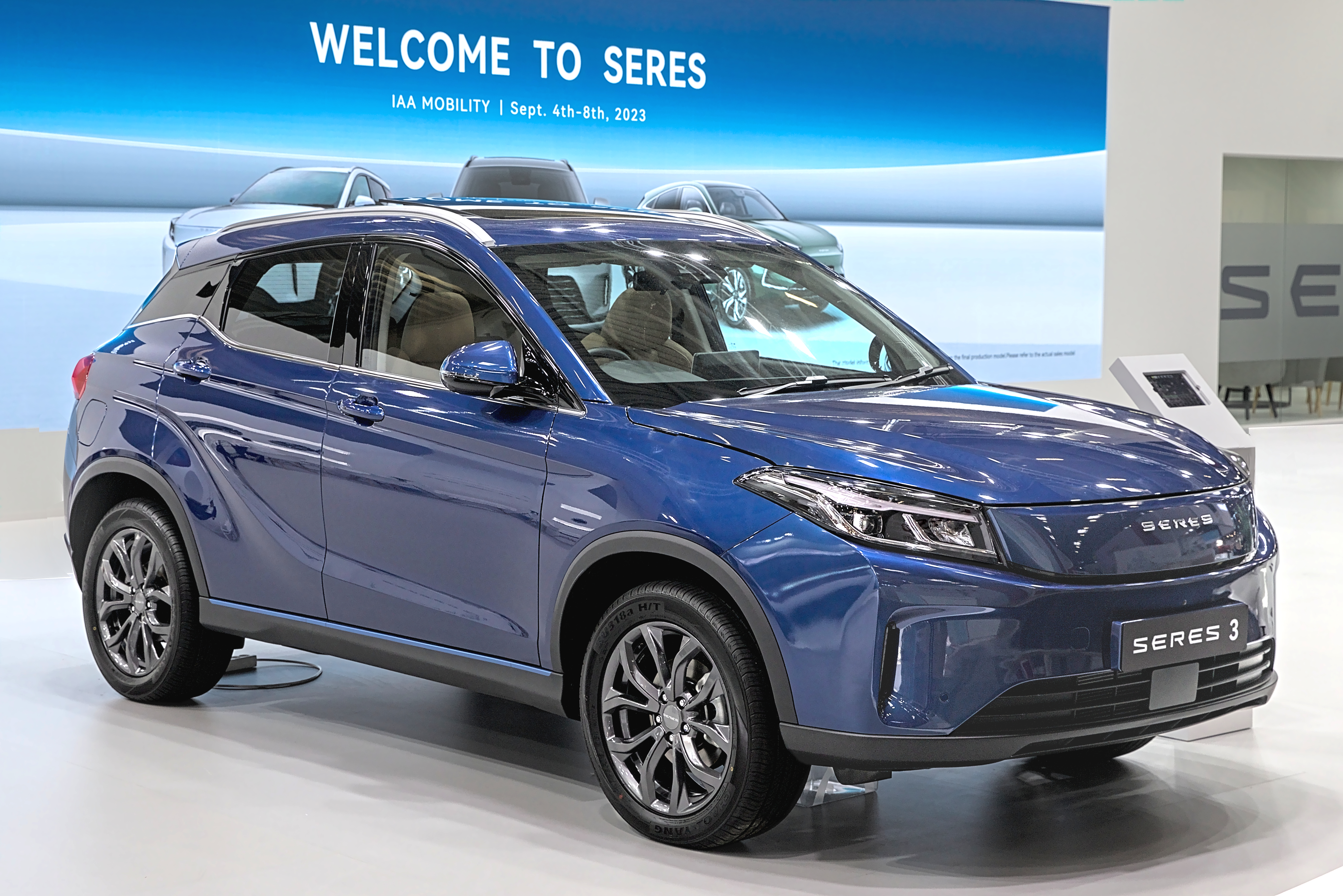
Seres 3

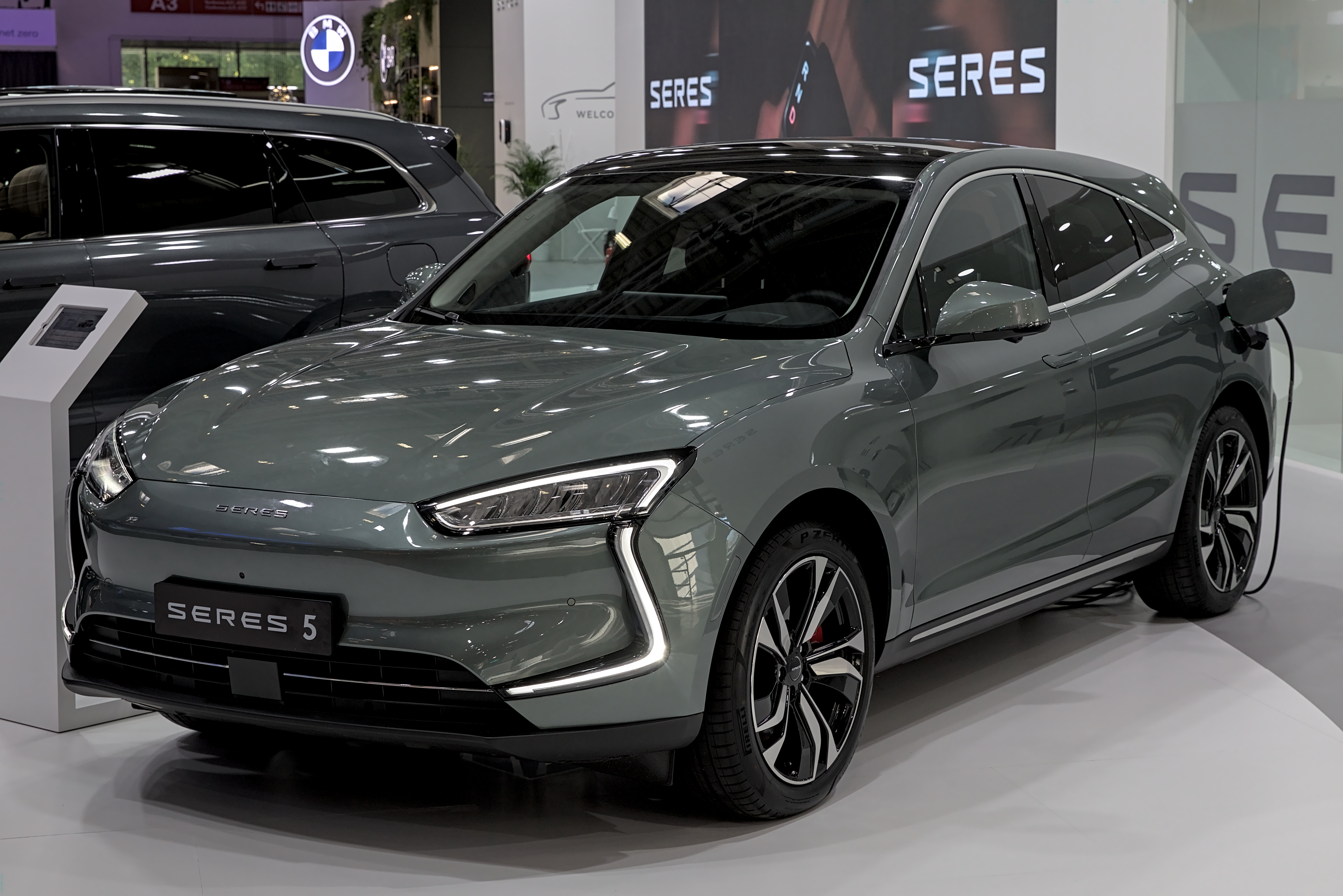
Seres 5

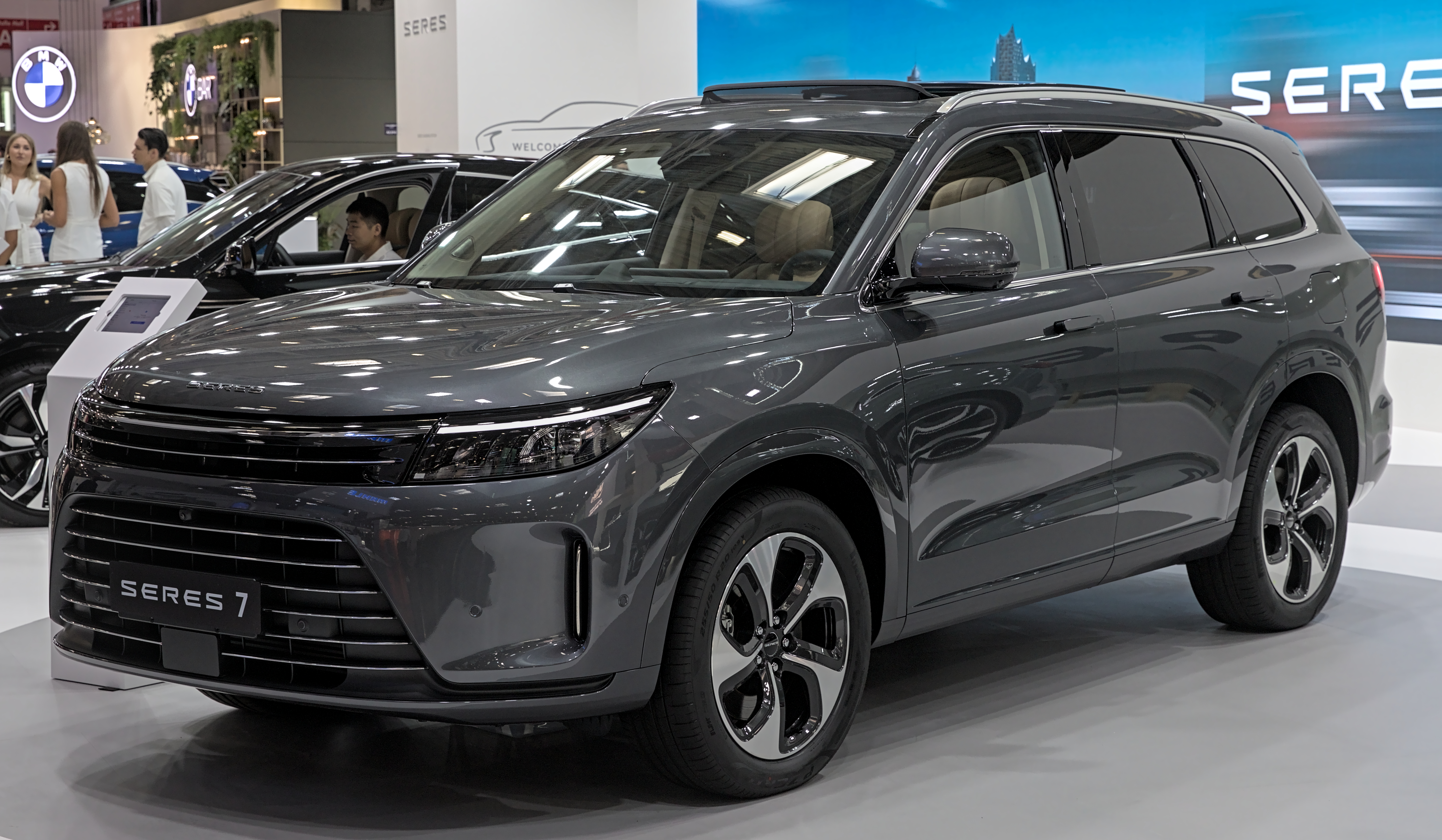
Seres 7

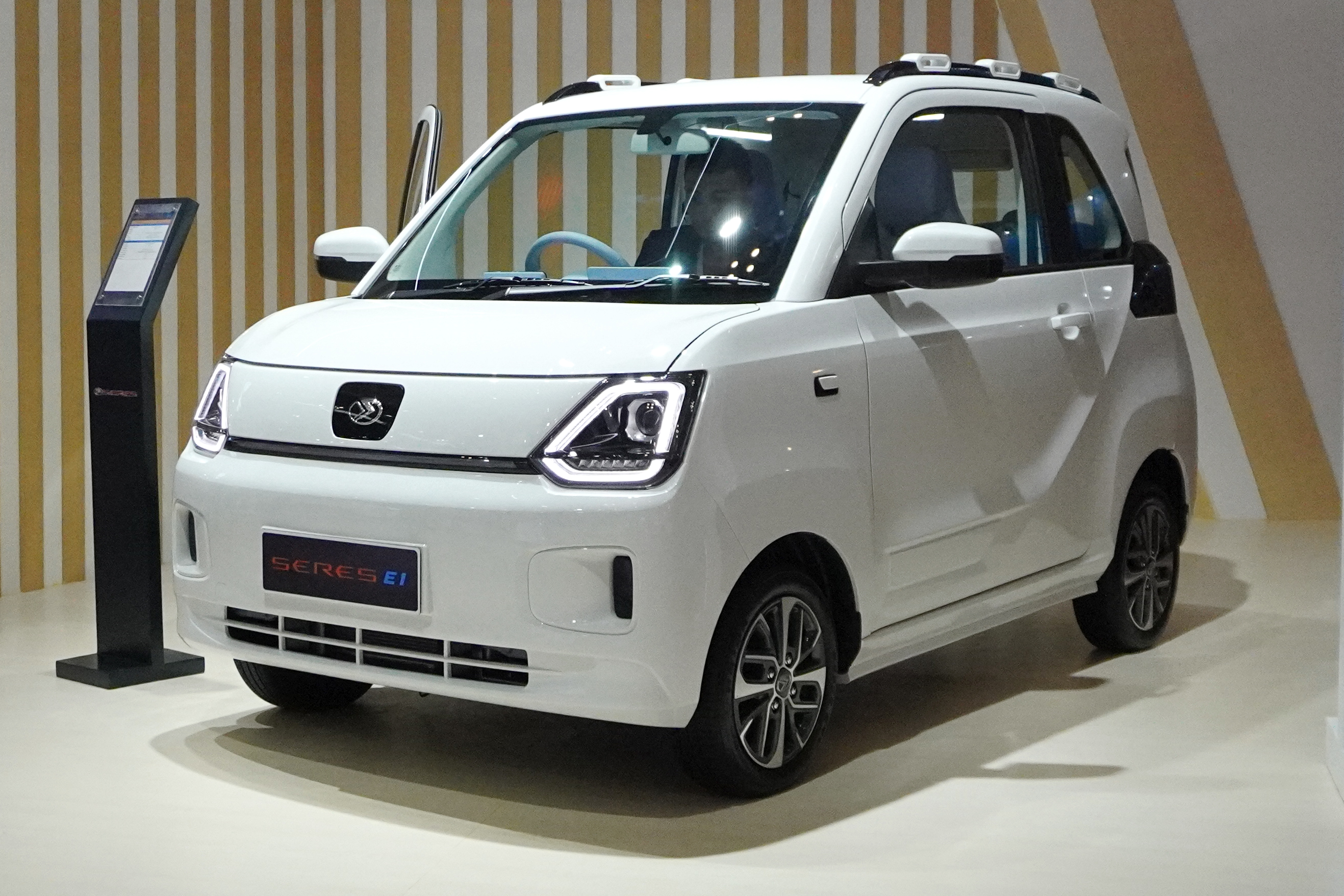
Seres E1

=== AITO ===
AITO is a brand Seres Auto collaborates with Huawei for smart electric vehicle. Huawei is leads in the design of AITO models while Seres conducts in production. It is only operated in Chinese market.

The AITO brand was owned by Seres, but was sold to Huawei in June 2023. Huawei transferred the ownership of the brand back to Seres in July 2024.

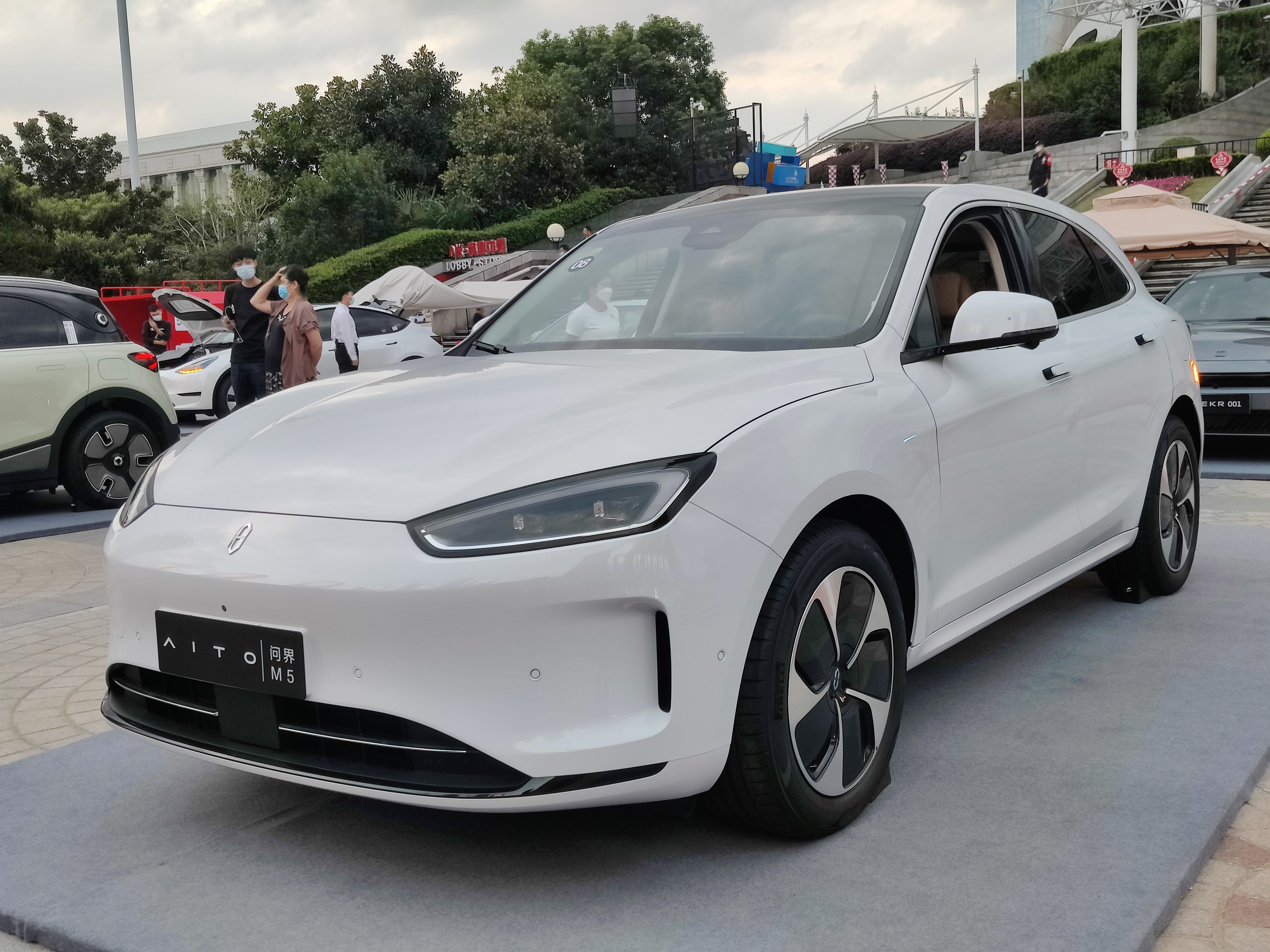
AITO M5

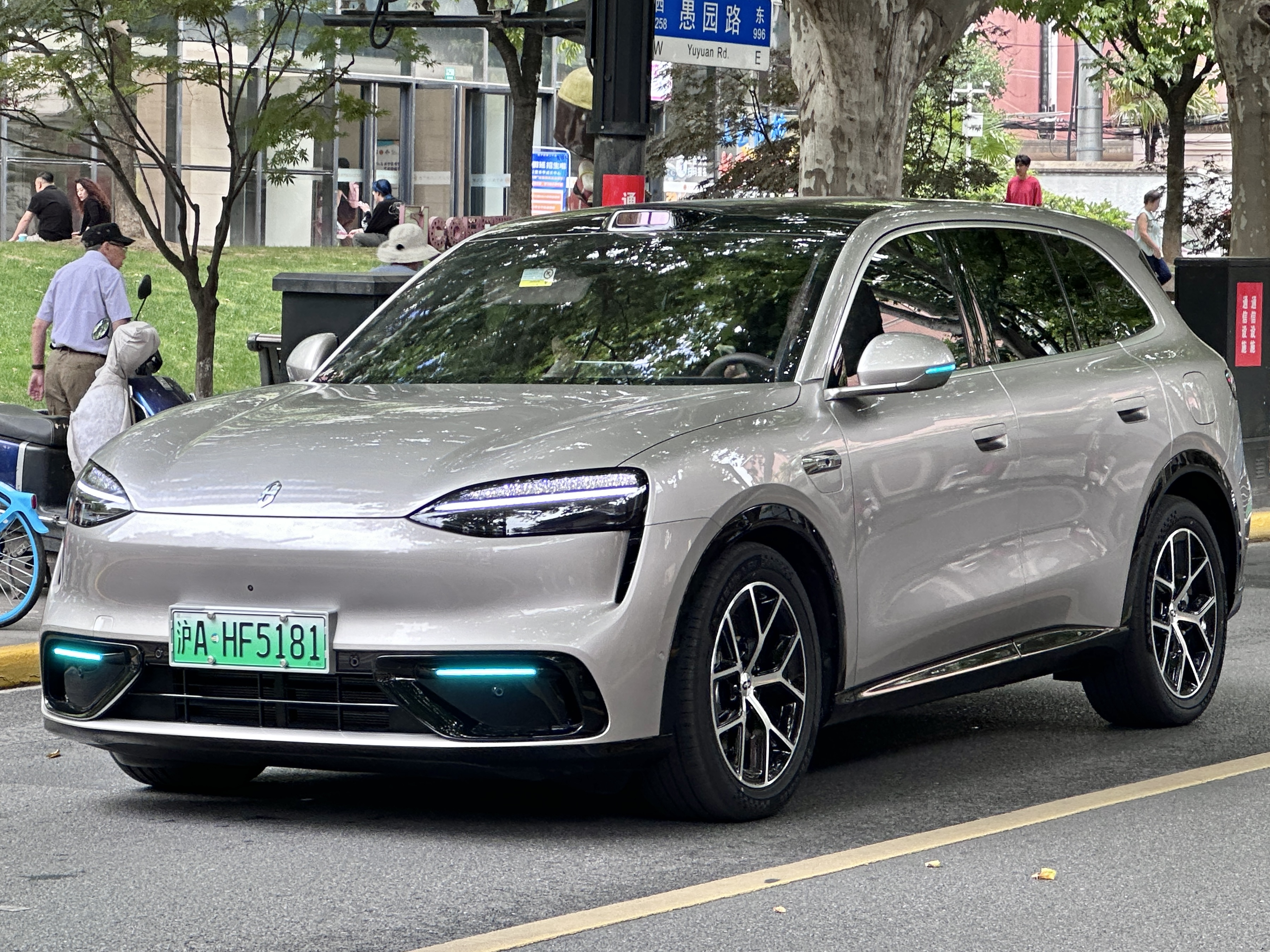
AITO M6

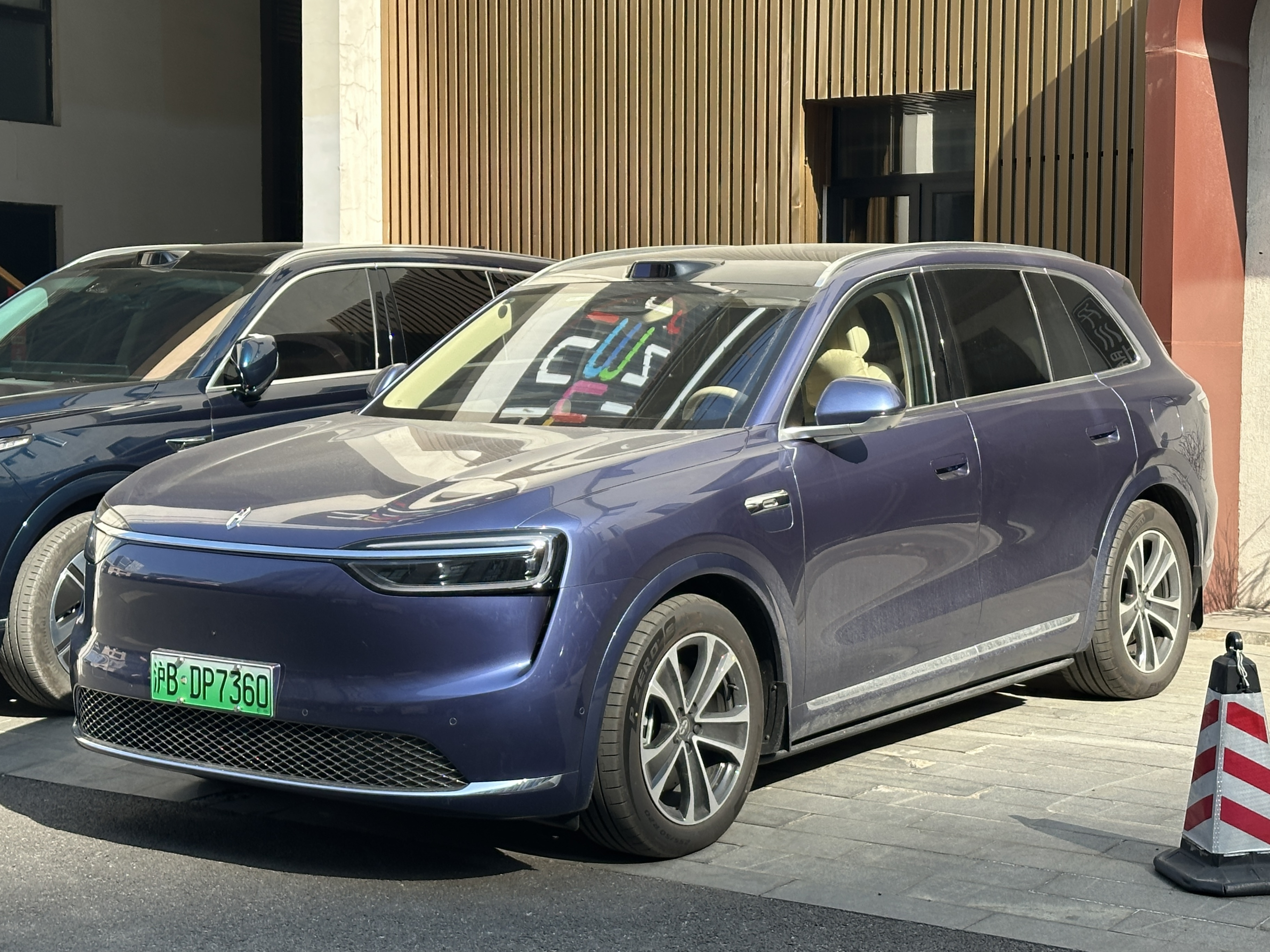
AITO M7 II

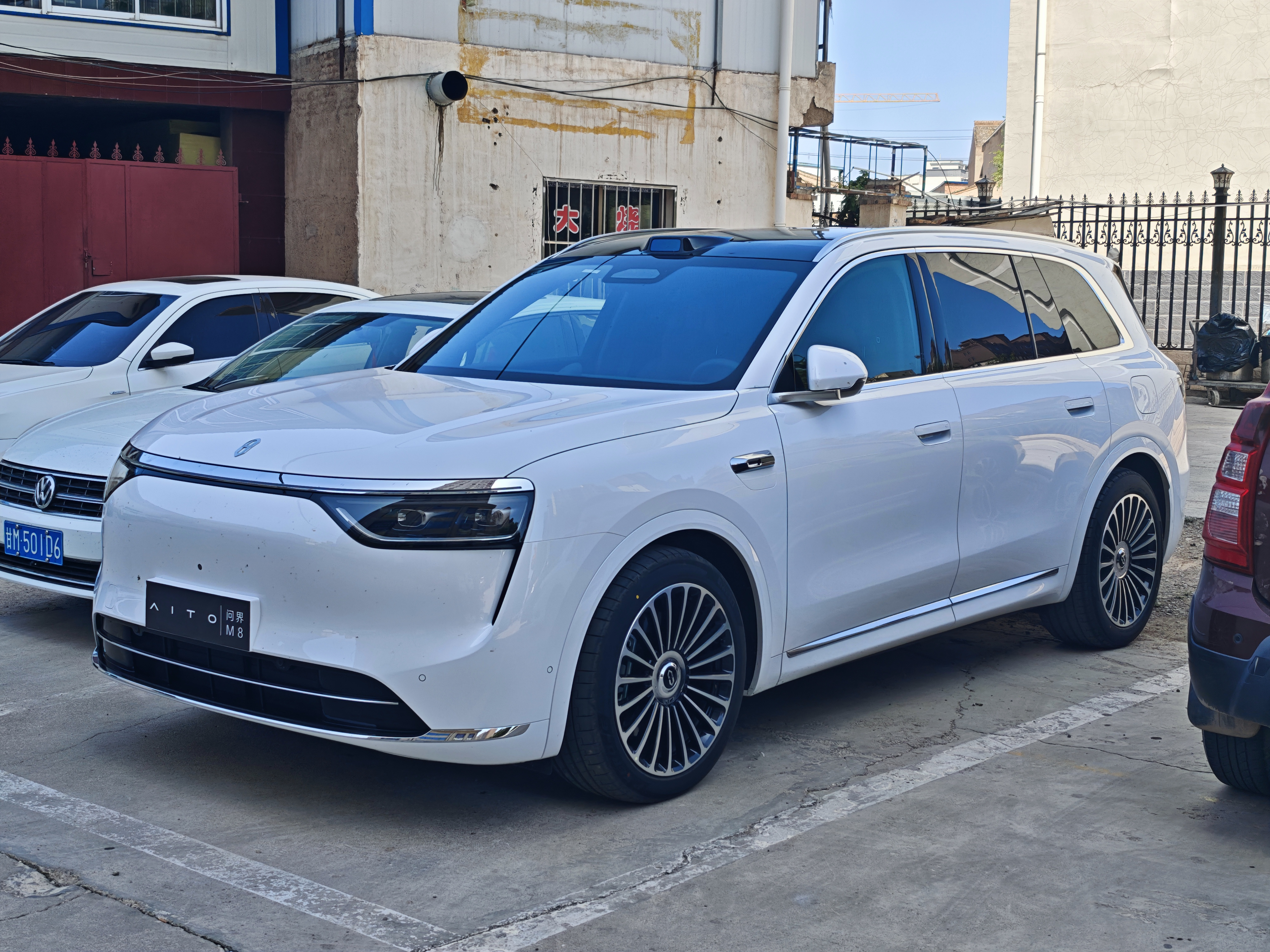
AITO M8

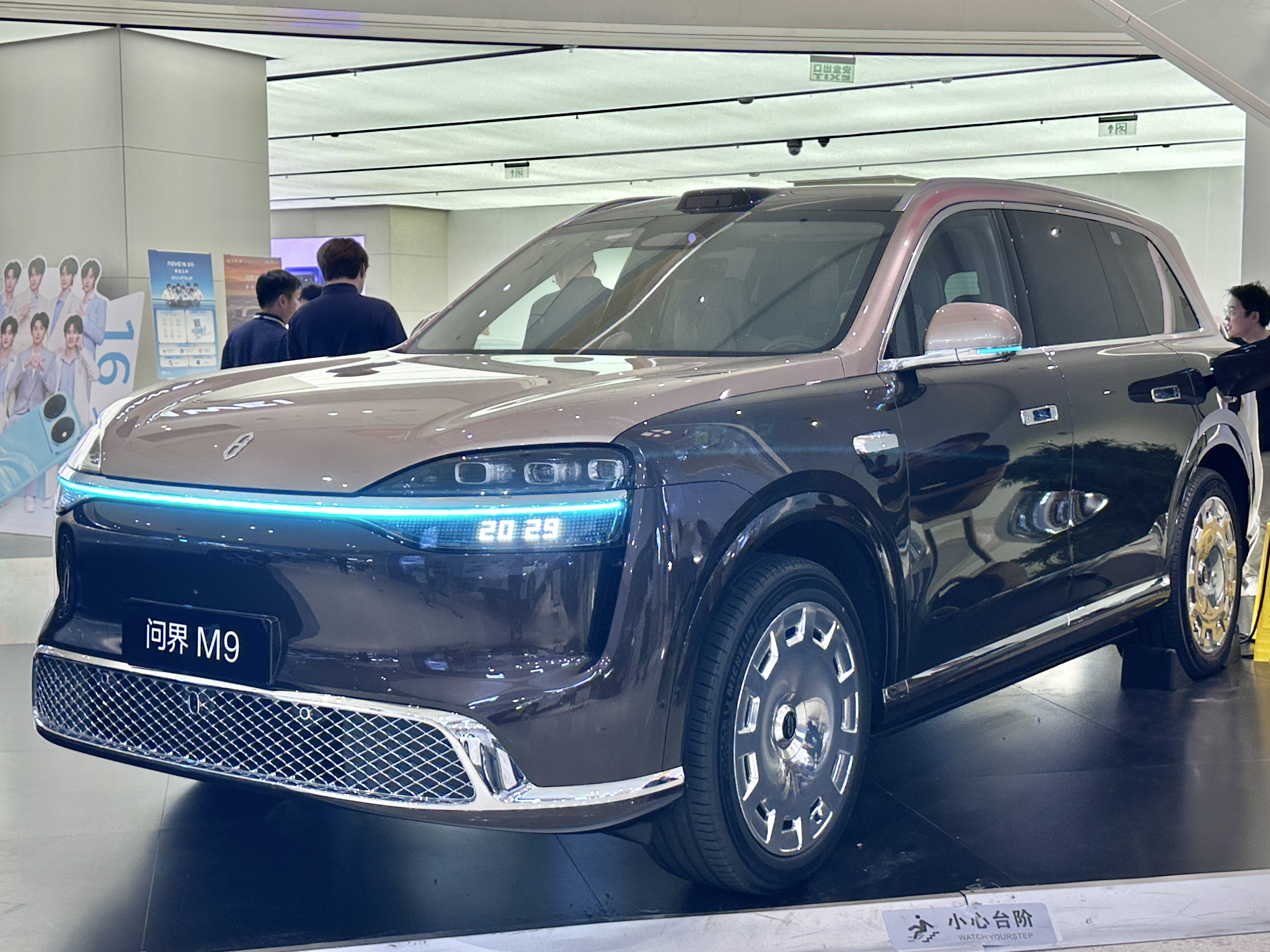
AITO M9 II

== Concept ==
- Seres SF6 Concept (2018)
- Seres SF7 Concept (2018)

== See also ==
- Automobile manufacturers and brands of China
- List of automobile manufacturers of China
