= AITO M5 =

Compact luxury SUV

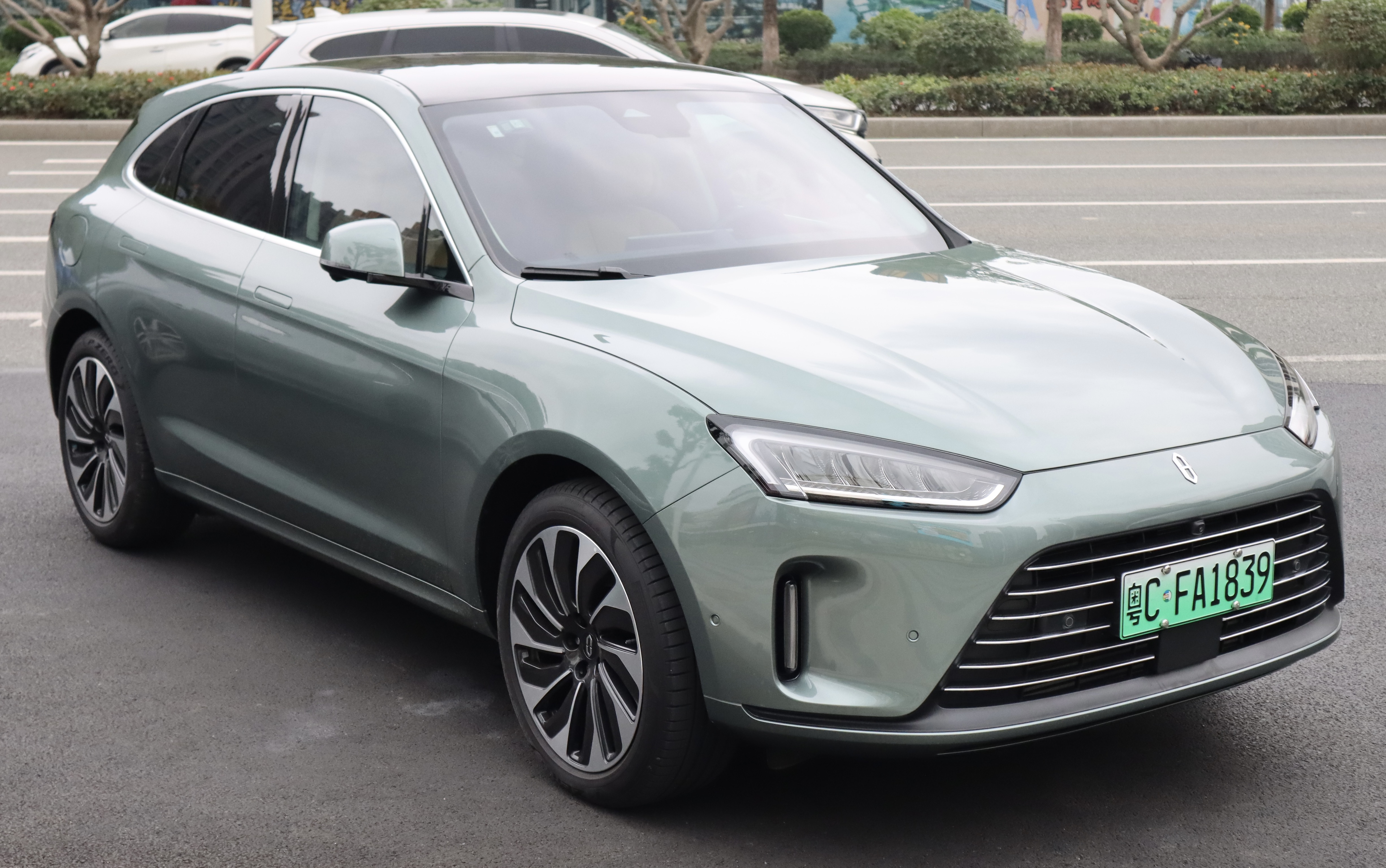
- AITO M5 EREV

Overview
- Manufacturer: Seres Automobile
- Also called: AITO M5 Ultra (facelift); Seres 5 (export); Seres M5 (Russia); Eres M5 (Iran); NWONE (UAE)
- Production: 2022–present
- Assembly: China: Chongqing

Body and chassis
- Class: Compact luxury SUV
- Body style: 5-door SUV
- Layout: Battery electric: Rear-motor, rear-wheel-drive; Dual-motor, all-wheel-drive (2022–2024); Range-extended EV: Front-engine, rear-motor, rear-wheel-drive; Front-engine, dual-motor, all-wheel-drive
- Related: Seres SF5

Powertrain
- Engine: Petrol range extender: 1.5 L SFG15TR turbo I4
- Electric motor: SEP200 induction; Huawei DriveONE
- Power output: 268–489 hp (200–365 kW; 272–496 PS)
- Hybrid drivetrain: Range extender series hybrid
- Battery: 40 kWh NMC CATL; 42 kWh NMC CATL; 79.9 kWh LFP CATL; 83 kWh LFP CATL
- Range: 1,275–1,440 km (792–895 mi) CLTC
- Electric range: 552–620 km (343–385 mi) (EV; CLTC); 180–255 km (112–158 mi) (EREV; CLTC)
- Plug-in charging: 3.5 kW V2L

Dimensions
- Wheelbase: 2,880 mm (113.4 in)
- Length: 4,785 mm (188.4 in)
- Width: 1,930 mm (76.0 in)
- Height: 1,620 mm (63.8 in)

The AITO M5 (Chinese: 问界M5; pinyin: Wènjiè M5) is a compact luxury SUV produced by Seres under the AITO brand in collaboration with Huawei from 2022. The model is the first product of HIMA and the AITO brand, and slots under the later AITO M7. The M5 is available in two powertrain options, range extender electric (EREV) and battery electric (EV).

Since 2023, the M5 is included in the Harmony Intelligent Mobility Alliance (HIMA), a multi-brand collaboration model with Huawei.

== Overview ==
The AITO M5 was initially unveiled only as a range extended electric vehicle (EREV) on December 23, 2021 and is based on the same platform as the Seres SF5. A battery-electric variant (BEV) was unveiled in September 2022. The AITO M5 has a 10.4-inch dashboard display and a 15.6-inch screen on the center console, and is one of the first vehicles to ever utilize the Huawei HarmonyOS 3 infotainment system. The EREV version has two 40 W wireless chargers with active cooling, three 66 W wired, one 60 W wired and two 27 W Huawei MagLink magnetic chargers. All chargers can be used simultaneously.

In March 2023, the AITO M5 was shortly rebranded as Huawei AITO M5 before Yu Chengdong, a Huawei executive issued that all promotional materials related to Huawei will be removed on April 1 from AITO stores.

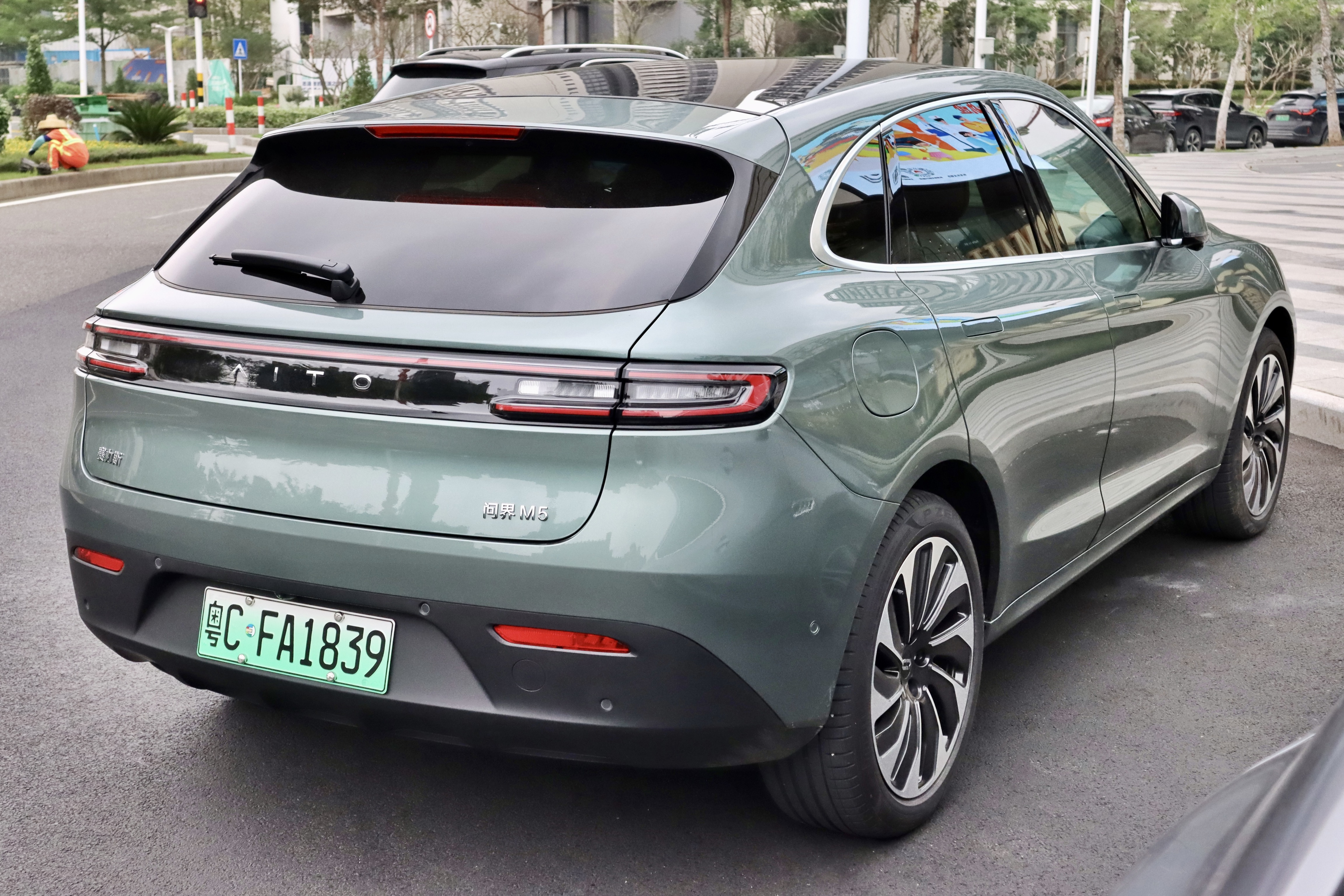
Rear view

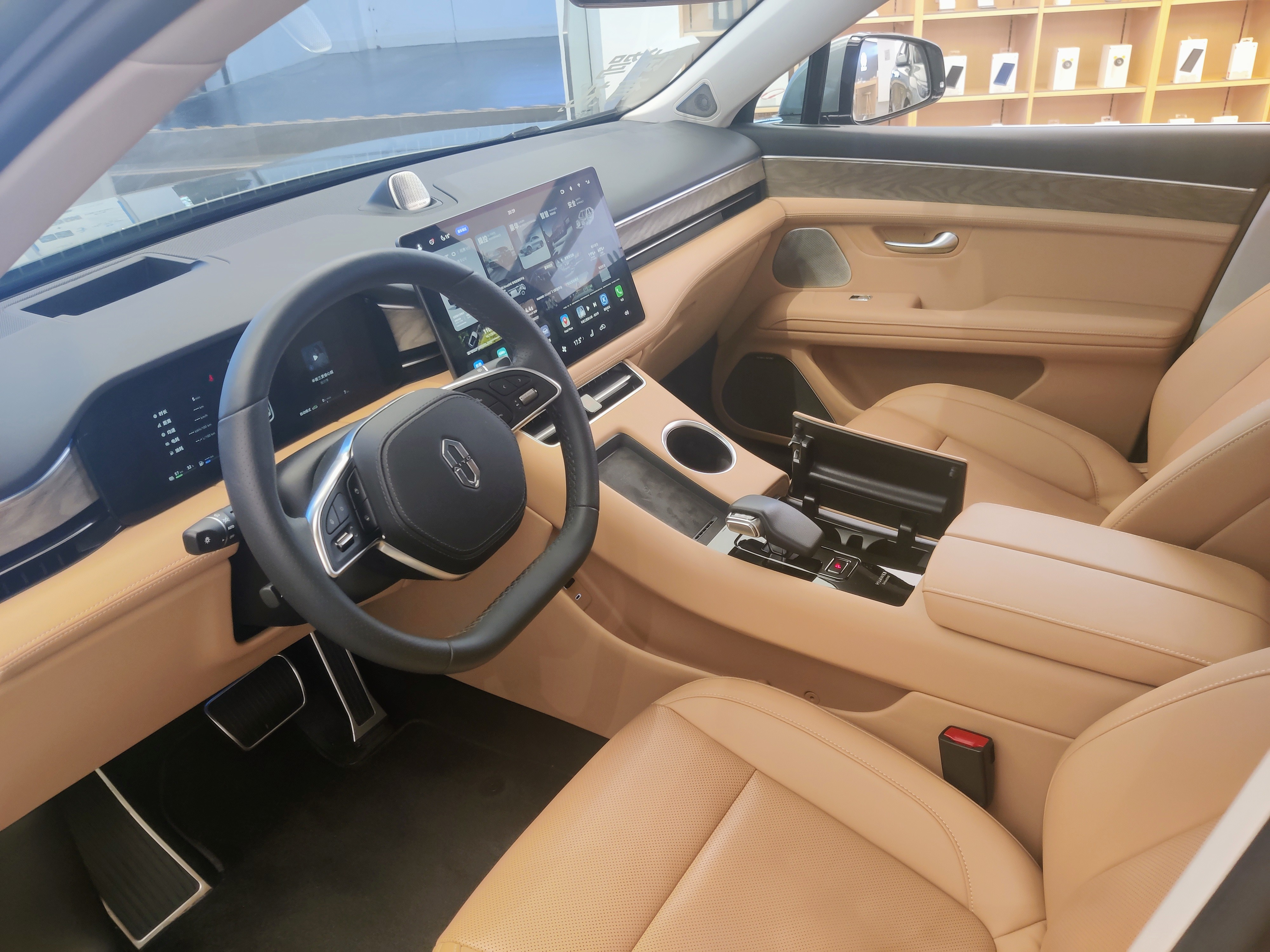
Interior

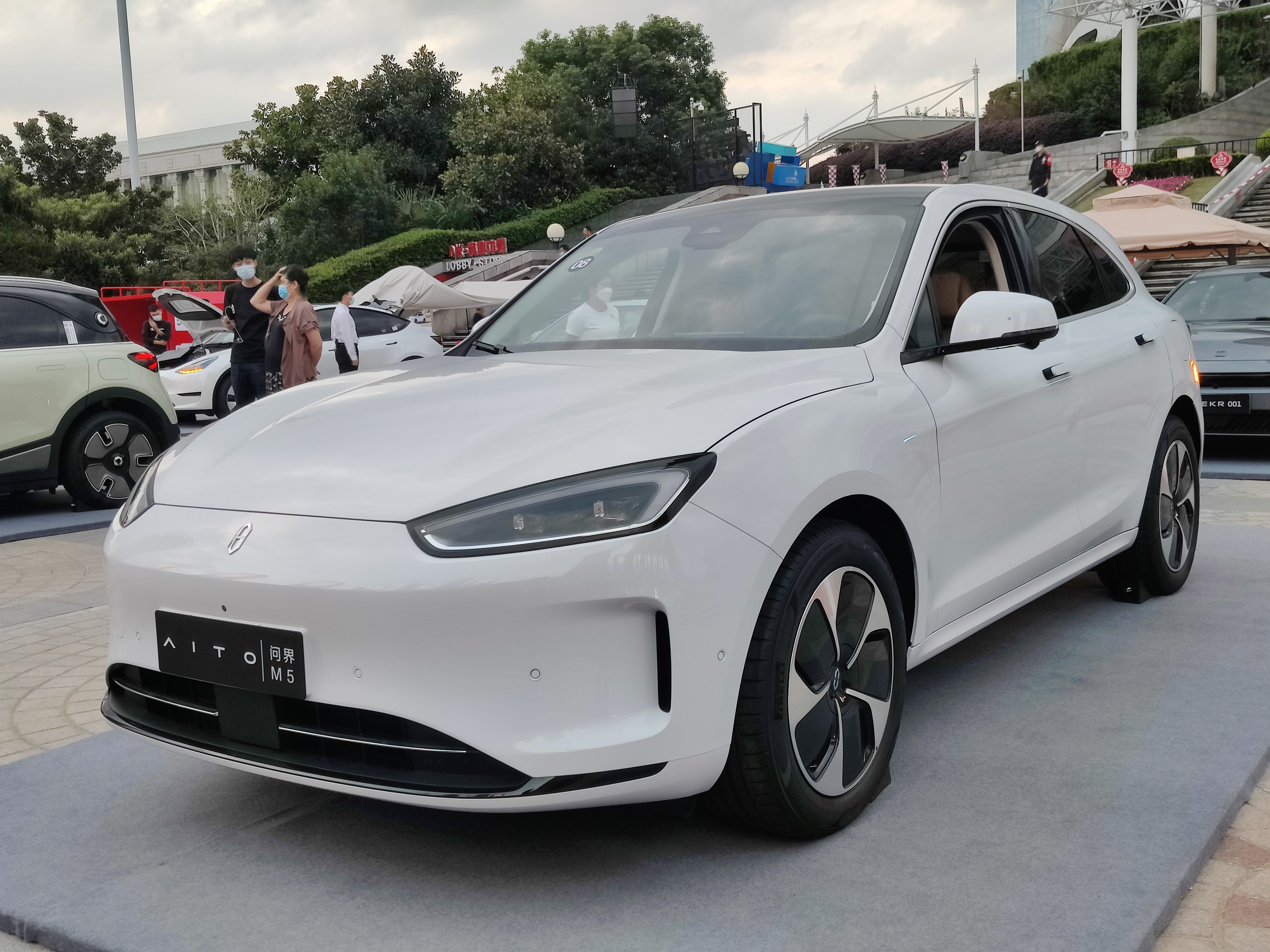
AITO M5 EV

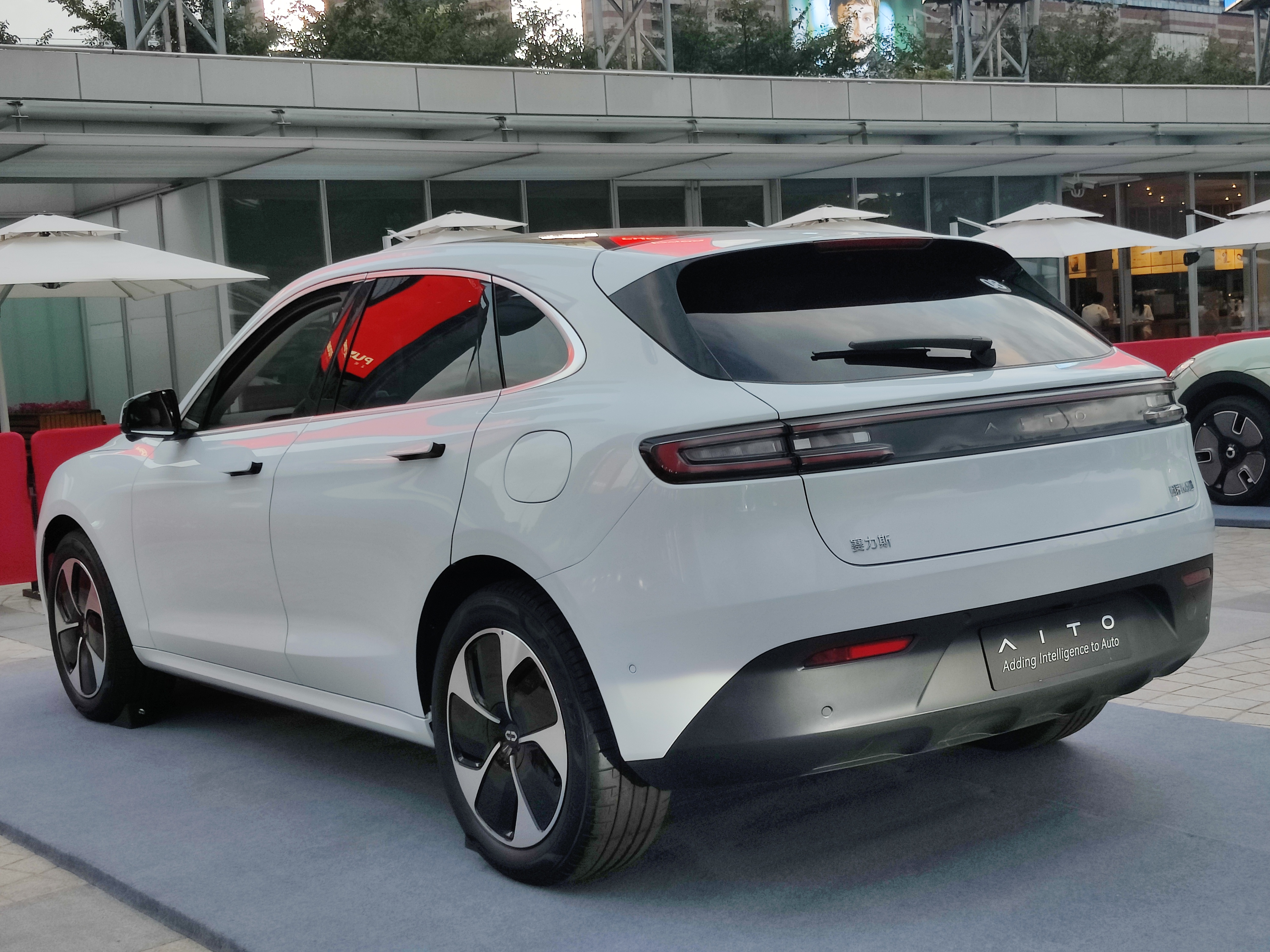
Rear view

=== Facelift (2025) ===
The AITO announced the refreshed version of the M5 for 2025 called the Ultra on March 1, 2025 with pre-orders starting the same day, and launch later that month on 20 March with deliveries beginning on April 3. The exterior receives two new paint colors, Phantom Purple and Zero-Degree White, and a new optional Obsidian visual package with black-painted wheels, badge, lower grille, and window trim.

The interior features minor changes including the move to a column-mounted shifter allowing for a 14.4 L (0.51 cu ft) open storage space underneath the center console, and the front passenger seat gains a four-way adjustable legrest. The front cupholders are reconfigured to be side-by-side discrete units, the wireless charging pads have been upgraded to 50 W, and the USB-C charging outlet now outputs 100 W. The seat upholstery gains a new Red Tea Orange color option.

Every variant of the M5 Ultra is equipped with Huawei's ADS 3.3 ADAS system as standard, with sensor upgrades including one new 192-line LiDAR and five 4-dimension mmWave radars. The system is capable of supervised autonomous driving in highway and urban environments, automatic emergency braking (AEB) in all directions, automatic emergency steering, and a remote control parking function. The braking system has been improved, with 81% smoother braking according to AITO.

The powertrain hardware remains unchanged compared to the 2024 model, and the M5 Ultra is available in battery-electric and range extended rear-wheel drive, or range-extender exclusive all-wheel drive.

== Powertrain ==
The range extended version of the AITO M5 is equipped with a 1.5-litre turbocharged engine producing 92 kW (123 hp; 125 PS) as a range extender with a 56-litre (12 imp gal; 15 US gal) fuel tank. The combined fuel consumption of the AITO M5 is 1.1 L/100 km (90.9 km/L; 256.8 mpg_{‑imp}; 213.8 mpg_{‑US}) and 1.2 L/100 km (83.3 km/L; 235.4 mpg_{‑imp}; 196.0 mpg_{‑US}) for the 2WD and AWD models. The AITO M5 has a 140-kilometre (87 mi) (NEDC) electric range from its 40 kWh battery. When paired with the range extender, which can produce 3.2 kWh/liter of petrol, the combined range is 1,000 kilometres (621 mi) (NEDC).

The AITO M5 rear-wheel drive model uses a rear permanent magnet synchronous motor providing a peak power of 200 kW (268 hp; 272 PS) and 360 N⋅m (37 kg⋅m; 266 lb⋅ft) of torque. The 4WD model uses a rear motor with 150 kW (201 hp; 204 PS) of power and 300 N⋅m (31 kg⋅m; 221 lb⋅ft) of torque and a front induction asynchronous motor with a power of 165 kW (221 hp; 224 PS) and 420 N⋅m (43 kg⋅m; 310 lb⋅ft) of torque, giving the car a total peak output of 315 kW (422 hp; 428 PS) and 720 N⋅m (73 kg⋅m; 531 lb⋅ft) of torque allowing the vehicle to do a 0–100 km/h (0–62 mph) acceleration in 4.4 seconds.

The battery-electric M5 EV single-motor variant uses a rear positioned motor with rear-wheel-drive and driving range under CLTC standards is 620 kilometres (385 mi). The four-wheel-drive dual motor driving range under CLTC is 552 kilometres (343 mi).

| Model | Year | Battery | Engine | | Motor | Output | Range | |
| Model | Year | Battery | Engine | | Motor | Output | Electric | Total |
|---|---|---|---|---|---|---|---|---|
| EREV RWD | 2022 | 40 kWh NMC CATL | 1.5 L H15RT I4 turbo | 92 kW (125 PS; 123 hp) | Rear: 200 kW Huawei DriveONE CTZ196XY0P4 | 200 kW (268 hp) 360 N⋅m (266 lb⋅ft) | 200 km (124 mi) | 1,195 km (743 mi) |
| EREV RWD | 2023– | 42 kWh NMC CATL | 1.5 L H15RT I4 turbo | 112 kW (152 PS; 150 hp) | Rear: 200 kW Huawei DriveONE CTZ196XY0P4 | 200 kW (268 hp) 360 N⋅m (266 lb⋅ft) | 255 km (158 mi) | 1,440 km (895 mi) |
| EV RWD | 2022–2023 | 79.927 kWh LFP CATL | — | | Rear: 200 kW Huawei DriveONE CTZ196XY0P4 | 200 kW (268 hp) 360 N⋅m (266 lb⋅ft) | 540 km (336 mi) | |
| EV RWD | 2024– | 83 kWh LFP CATL | — | | Rear: 200 kW Huawei DriveONE CTZ196XY0P4 | 200 kW (268 hp) 360 N⋅m (266 lb⋅ft) | 602–620 km (374–385 mi) | |
| EREV AWD | 2022 | 40 kWh NMC CATL | 1.5 L H15RT I4 turbo | 92 kW (125 PS; 123 hp) | Front: 165 kW Huawei DriveONE CYS210XY0P1 Rear: 200 kW Huawei DriveONE CTZ196XY0P4 | 365 kW (489 hp) 675 N⋅m (498 lb⋅ft) | 180 km (112 mi) | |
| EREV AWD | 2023– | 42 kWh NMC CATL | 1.5 L H15RT I4 turbo | 112 kW (152 PS; 150 hp) | Front: 165 kW Huawei DriveONE CYS210XY0P1 Rear: 200 kW Huawei DriveONE CTZ196XY0P4 | 365 kW (489 hp) 675 N⋅m (498 lb⋅ft) | 235 km (146 mi) | 1,275 km (792 mi) |
| EV AWD | 2022–2023 | 79.927 kWh LFP CATL | — | | Front: 165 kW Huawei DriveONE CYS210XY0P1 Rear: 200 kW Huawei DriveONE CTZ196XY0P4 | 365 kW (489 hp) 675 N⋅m (498 lb⋅ft) | 500 km (311 mi) | |
| EV AWD | 2024 | 83 kWh LFP CATL | — | | Front: 165 kW Huawei DriveONE CYS210XY0P1 Rear: 200 kW Huawei DriveONE CTZ196XY0P4 | 365 kW (489 hp) 675 N⋅m (498 lb⋅ft) | 534–552 km (332–343 mi) | |

== Sales ==
AITO announced the M5 Ultra received 15,000 pre-orders on 30 April 2025 after they opened earlier that year on 1 March. On June 1 2025, the M5 Ultra exceeded 10,000 deliveries after they started on April 3.

| Year | China | | |
| Year | EREV | EV | Total |
|---|---|---|---|
| 2022 | 48,905 | 7,950 | 56,855 |
| 2023 | 21,799 | 13,270 | 35,069 |
| 2024 | 30,596 | 8,682 | 39,278 |
| 2025 | 25,418 | 10,753 | 36,171 |
