= Fengon 500 =

Compact crossover SUV

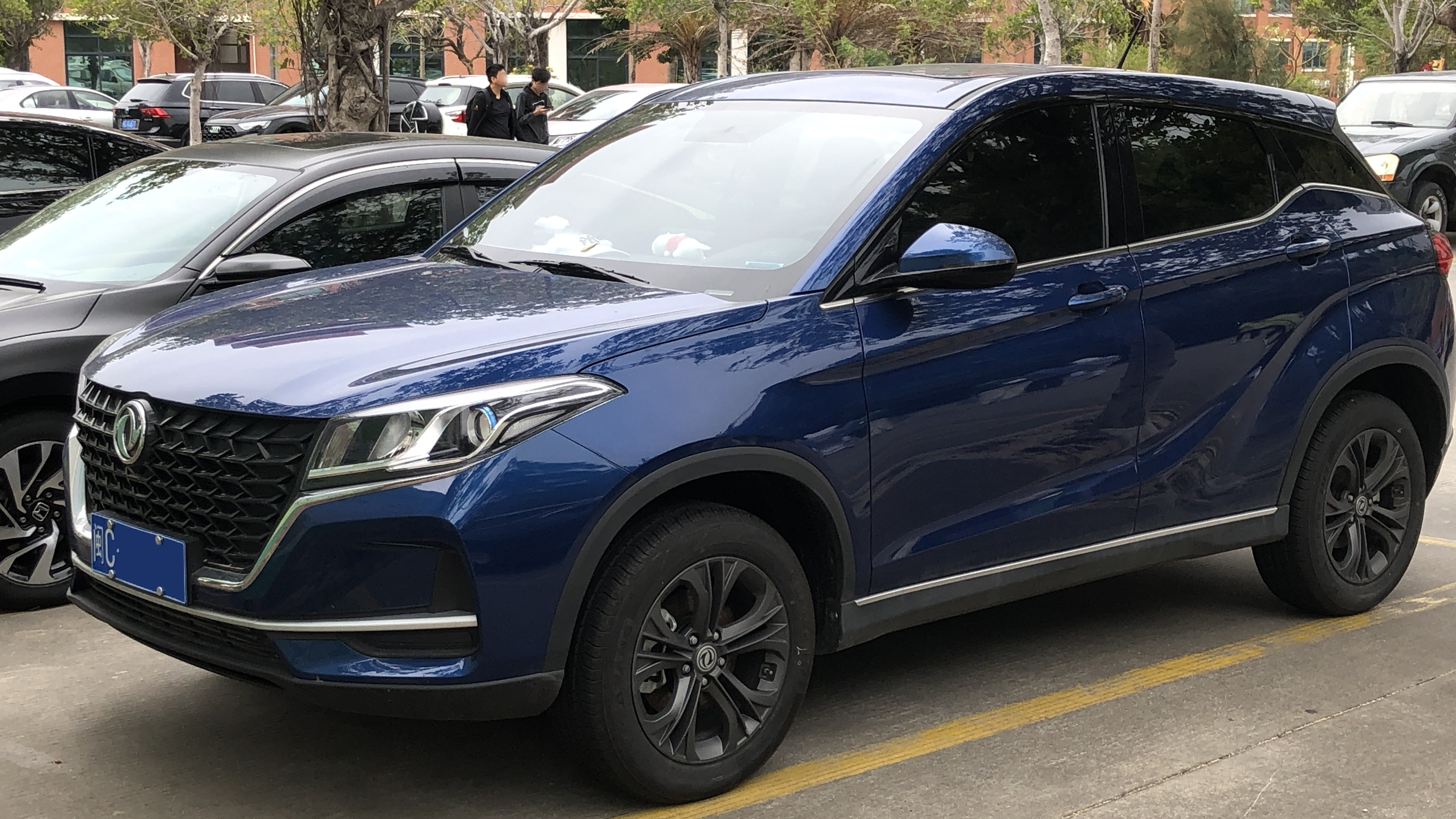
- Fengon 500

Overview
- Manufacturer: DFSK Motor
- Also called: Fengon E3; DFSK Glory 500; DFSK Glory E3; Seres ix3 Seres 3 DFSK Seres 3 Cirelli 2 (Italy); Ruichi S513; DFSK 500; Landian E3 (EV); Evolute i-Joy (Russia, until 2025); Al Damani DMV 300 (UAE); Lamaco Flo (Iran)
- Production: 2019–present
- Assembly: China: Chongqing

Body and chassis
- Class: Compact crossover SUV
- Body style: 5-door SUV
- Layout: Front-engine, front-wheel-drive (E3 / E3 EVR); Front-motor, front-wheel-drive (E3 EV / Seres 3)
- Related: DFSK Fengon ix5

Powertrain
- Engine: Petrol: 1.5 L I4 (E3); Petrol PHEV: 1.5 L I4 + electric motor (E3 EVR)
- Electric motor: E3 EV: 163 hp (122 kW) permanent magnet motor/generator
- Transmission: 5-speed manual CVT; 1-speed direct-drive (EV)
- Hybrid drivetrain: Plug-in series hybrid (E3 EVR)
- Battery: E3 EV: 53.6 kWh lithium-ion E3 EVR: 17.28 kWh lithium-ion Seres 3: 53.61 kWh Ternary Lithium-ion
- Electric range: E3 EV: 405 kilometres (252 mi) (NEDC); E3 EVR: 100 kilometres (62 mi) (NEDC)

Dimensions
- Wheelbase: 2,655 mm (104.5 in)
- Length: 4,425 mm (174.2 in)
- Width: 1,935 mm (76.2 in)
- Height: 1,765 mm (69.5 in)

The Fengon 500 is a compact crossover SUV produced since 2019 by the Fengon (Fengguang) brand of Chinese car manufacturer DFSK Motor, a joint venture between Dongfeng Motor and Sokon Group. In export markets it is sold as DFSK Glory E3 and Seres 3.

== Overview ==
On sale from November 2020, the Fengon 500 is the version powered by an internal combustion engine of 1.5 liters naturally aspirated petrol with multipoint injection delivering 116 horsepower with a 5-speed manual gearbox or CVT made by Punch Powertrain. It is exported out of China renamed DFSK Glory 500. The ICE version equipped with a 1.5 liter petrol engine was called Fengon 500 in China and Glory 500 in the export market.

The interior features fully functional instrumentation combined with the 10.5-inch touchscreen multimedia system with Baidu Apollo system.

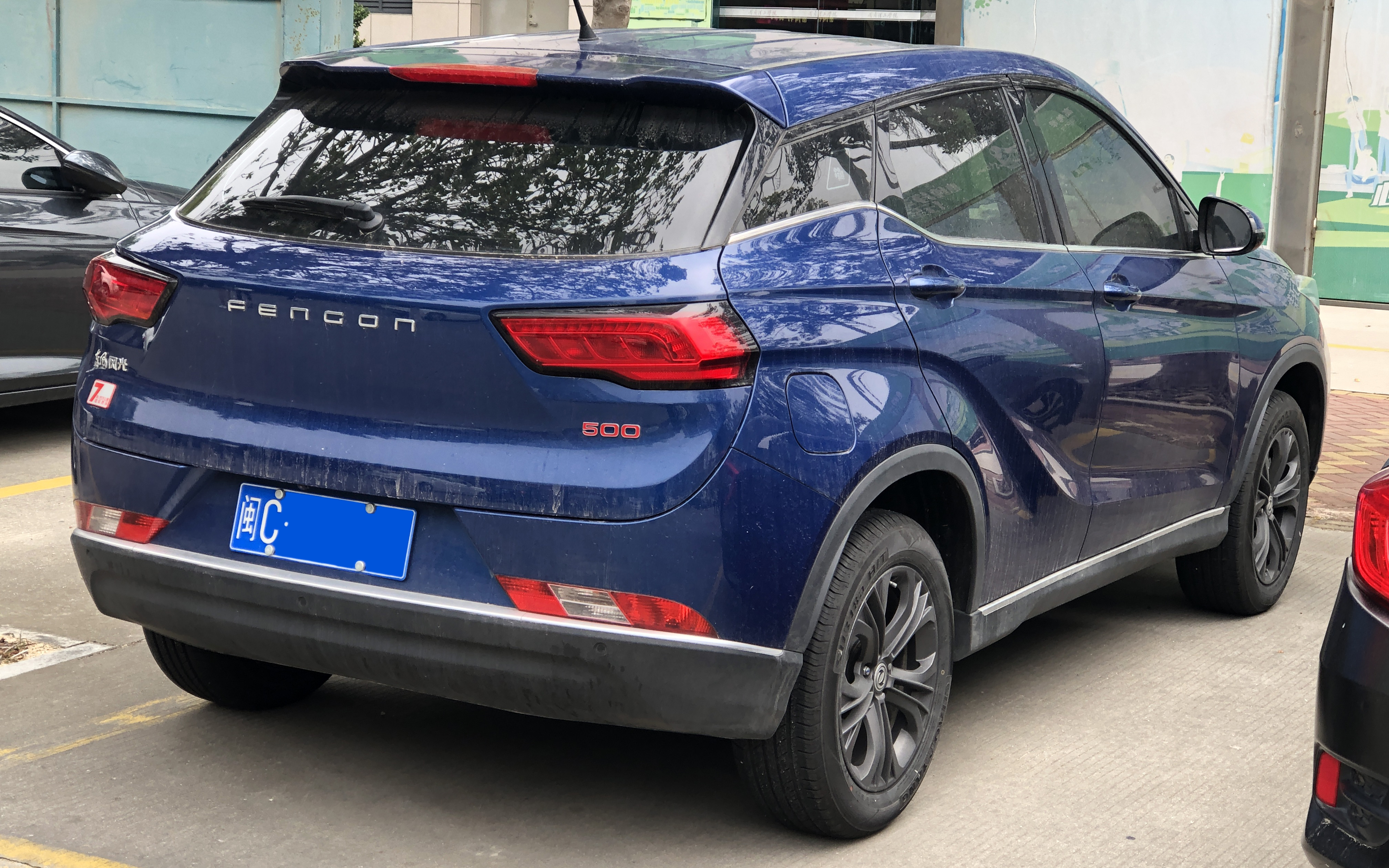
Rear view

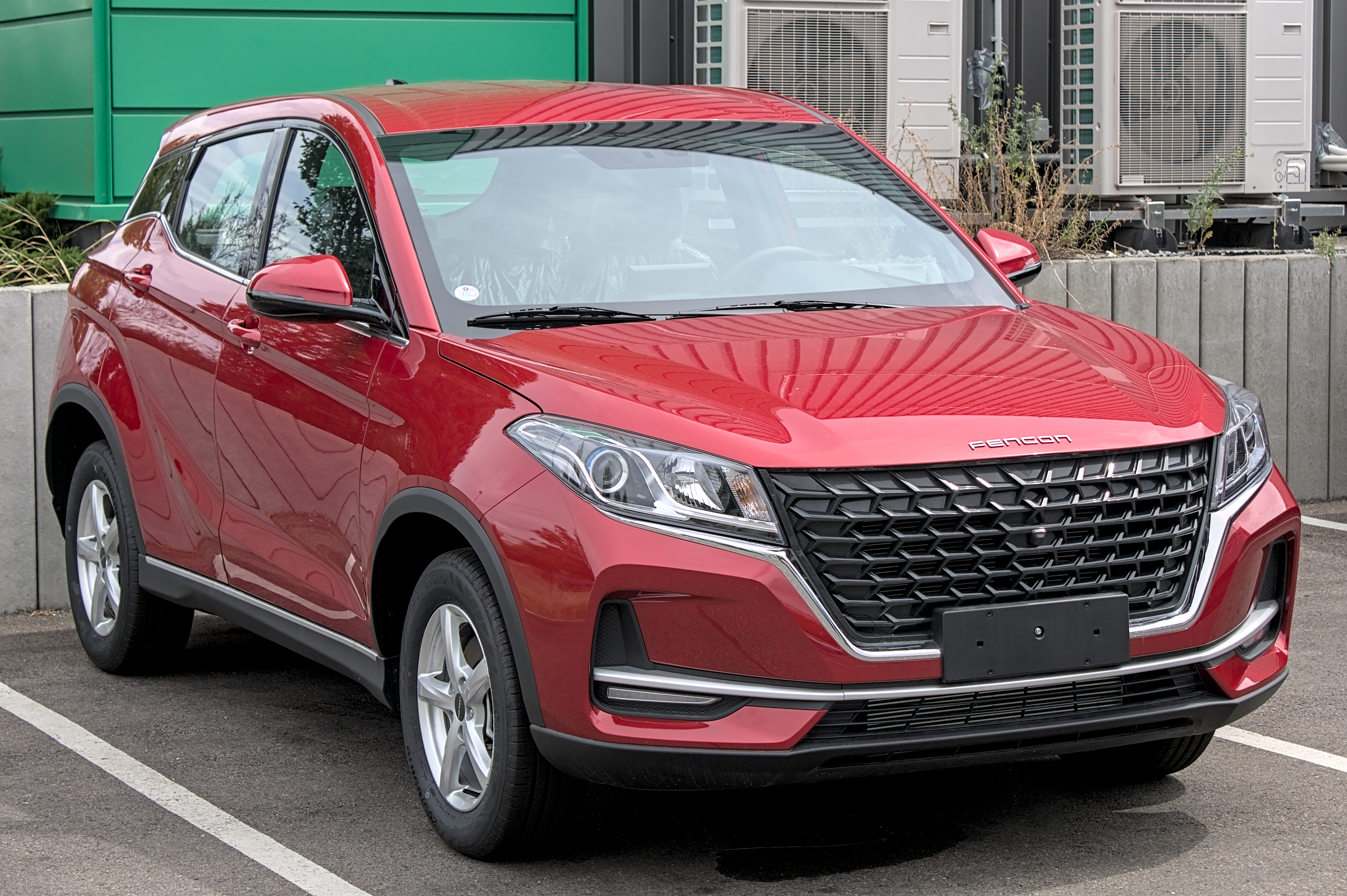
DFSK Fengon 500 (Europe)

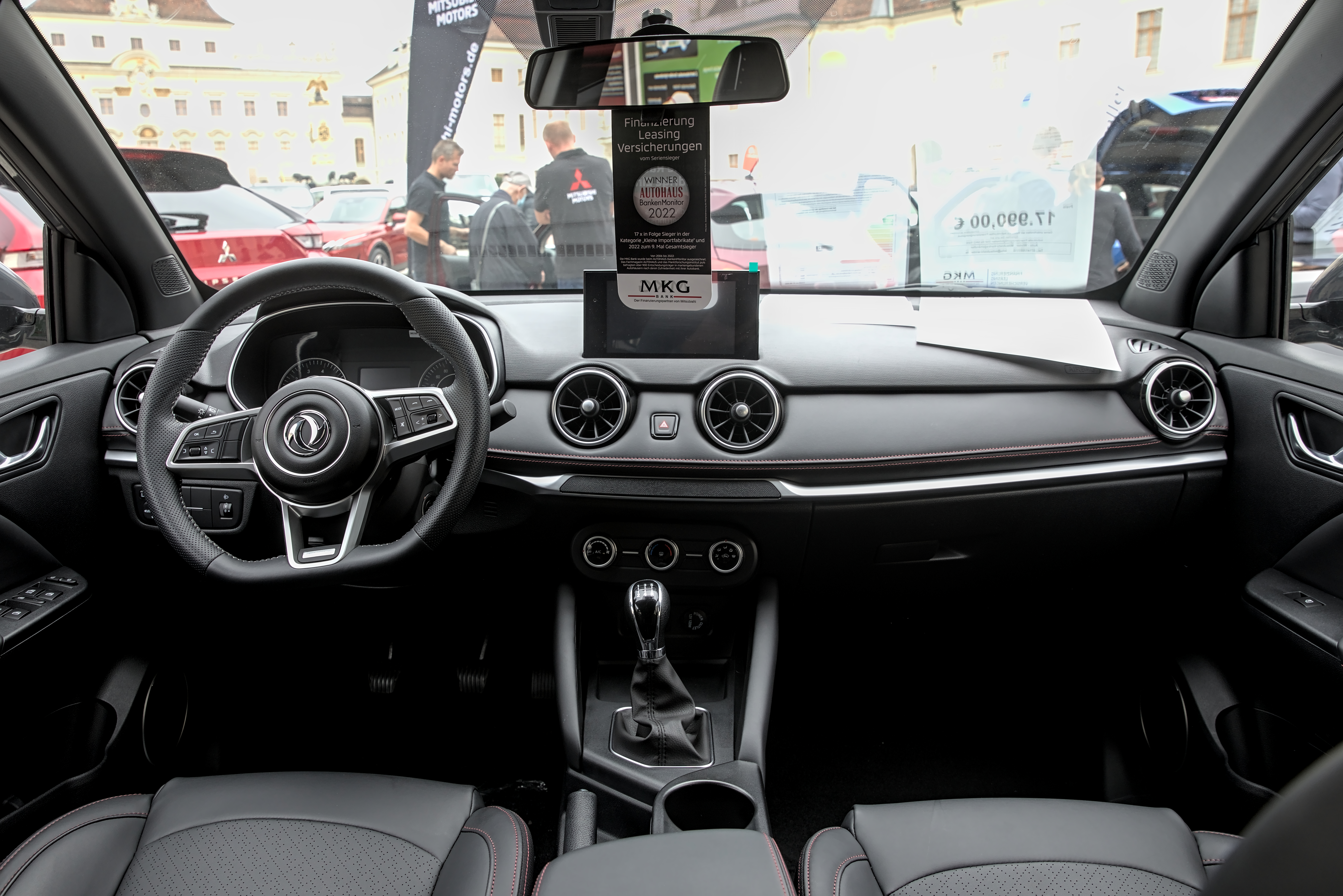
Fengon 500 (interior)

== Variants ==
=== Fengon E3 EV ===
The electric variant of the Fengon 500 is called the Fengon E3. The mechanics of the E3 are derived from the compact crossover Fengon ix5 but with a shorter wheelbase. Front suspension use a MacPherson strut and rear suspension uses a torsion beam semi independent strut. Presented at the Shanghai 2019 motor show in the electric version sold as Fengon E3 EV, it is the first compact SUV produced by DFSK as well as the cheapest model. The body has a length of 4,425 mm, 1,850 mm wide and 1,647 mm high with a wheelbase of 2655 mm (more compact than the Fengon/Glory 580). Aesthetically, it presents the new family feeling common to the Fengon ix5 crossover coupé.

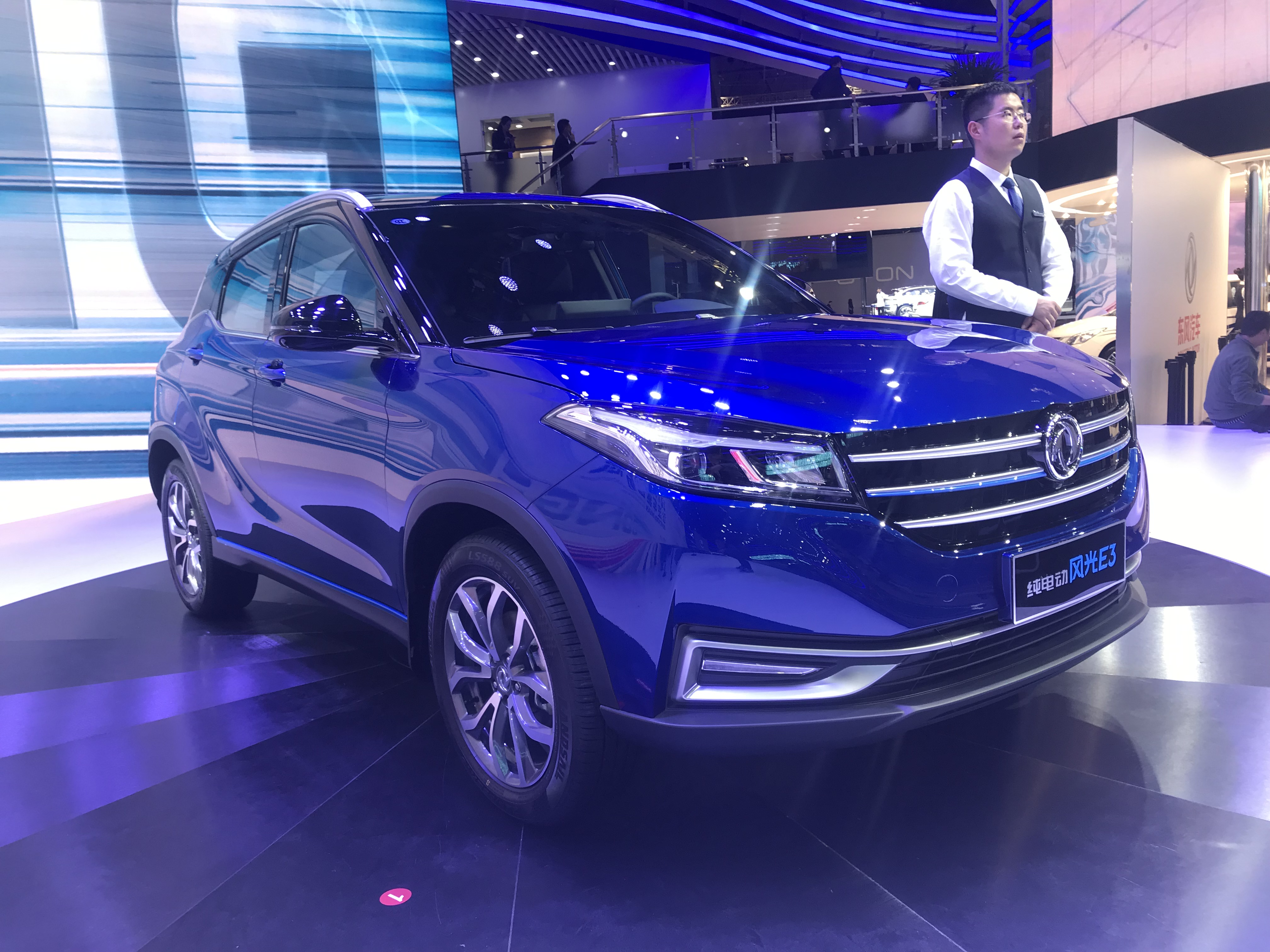
Dongfeng Fengon E3 (front view)

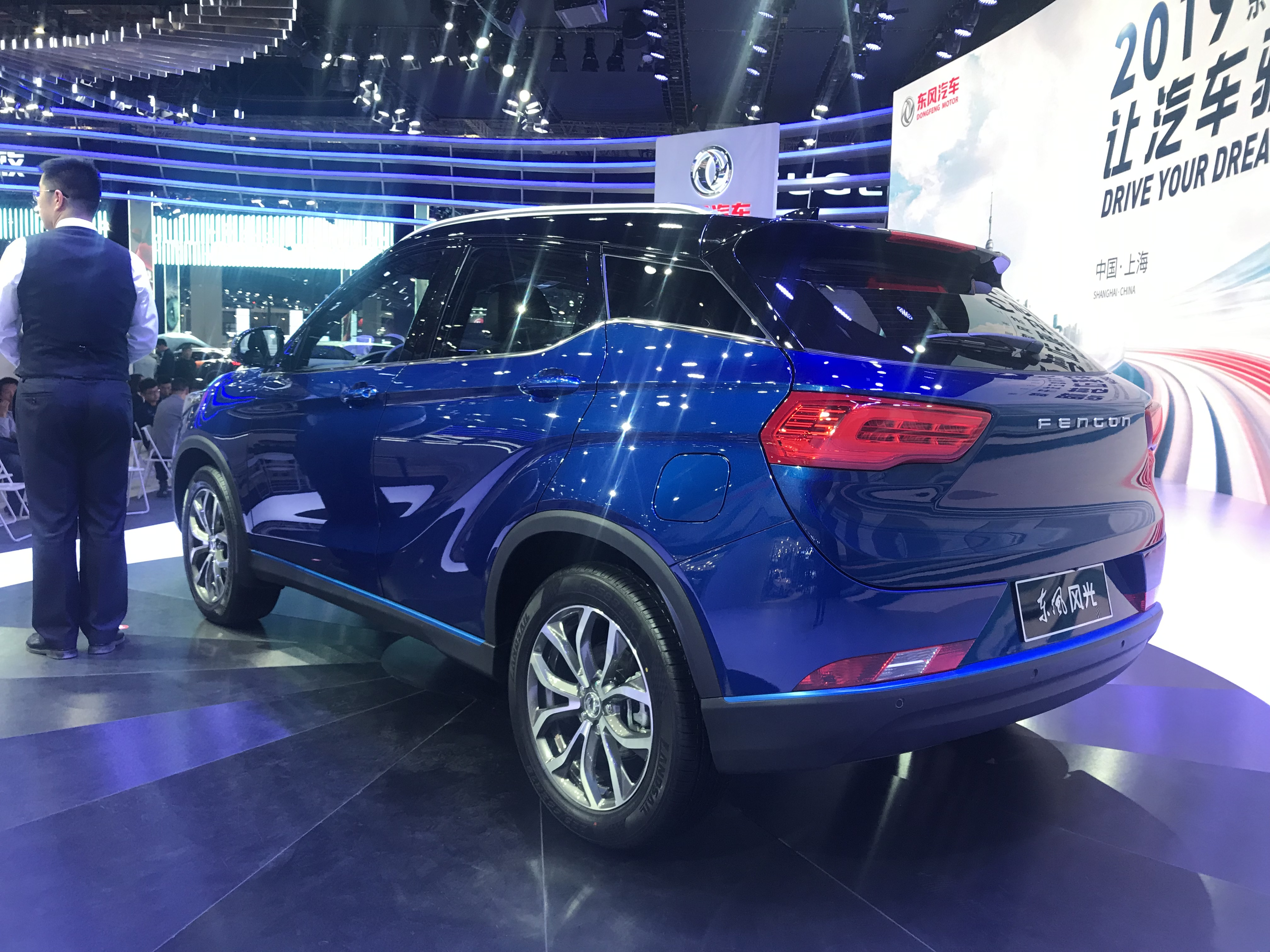
Dongfeng Fengon E3 (rear view)

The E3 EV has a three-phase asynchronous electric motor delivering 120 kW and 300 Nm of torque combined with a 53.6 kWh lithium pherophospate battery with a range (NEDC) of 405 km.

=== Fengon E3 EVR ===
The EVR is the extended range hybrid version of the E3 with a 1.5 liter four-cylinder petrol engine delivering 50 kW combined with a three-phase asynchronous electric motor delivering 120 kW. The 1.5 engine acts as a generator to recharge the 17.28 kWh lithium-ion battery. The range in Full Electric mode is 100 km while in the hybrid mode with the 1.5 that powers the batteries, the range is 950 km. This version in China is sold as the Seres ix3.

=== Seres 3 ===
It was sold as the Seres 3 in export markets such as Singapore and Malaysia. In Singapore, the Seres 3 was previewed at the 2024 Singapore Motorshow, before being launched later in the year. The Seres 3 was launched in Malaysia on 9 December 2025, in facelifted guise. Only 10 units were offered as part of the brand's introduction in Malaysia.

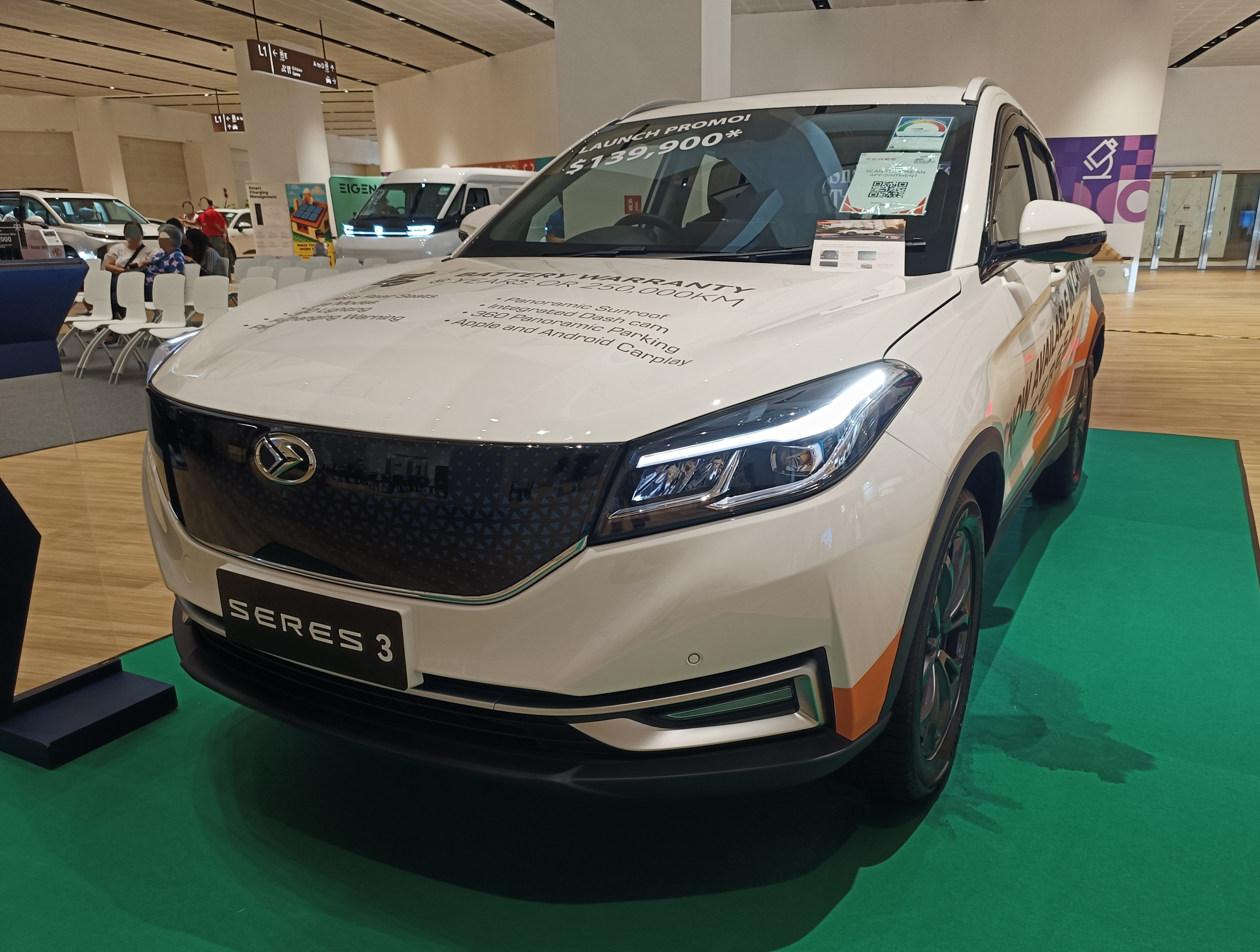
Seres 3 (pre-facelift)

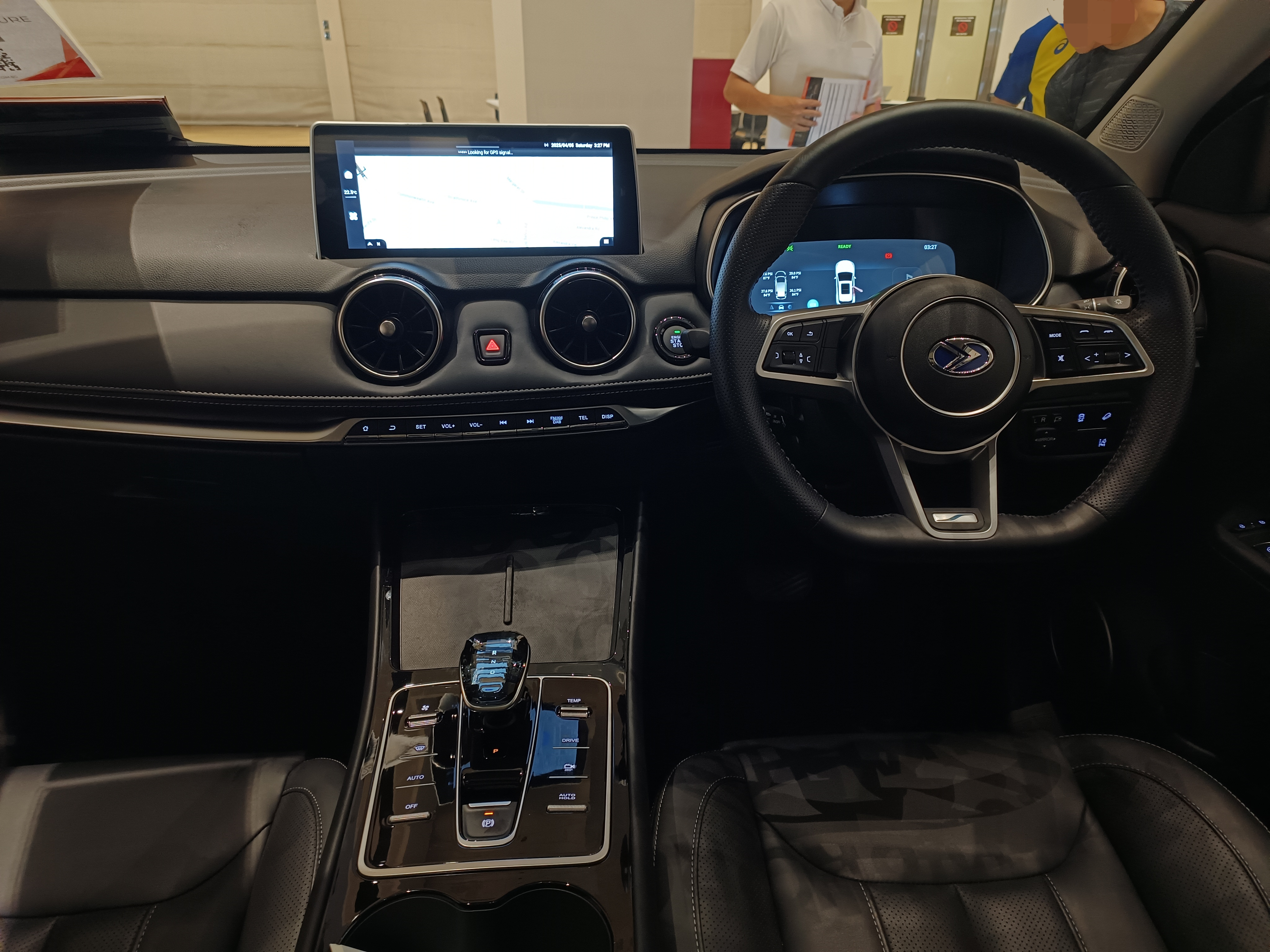
Interior (pre-facelift)

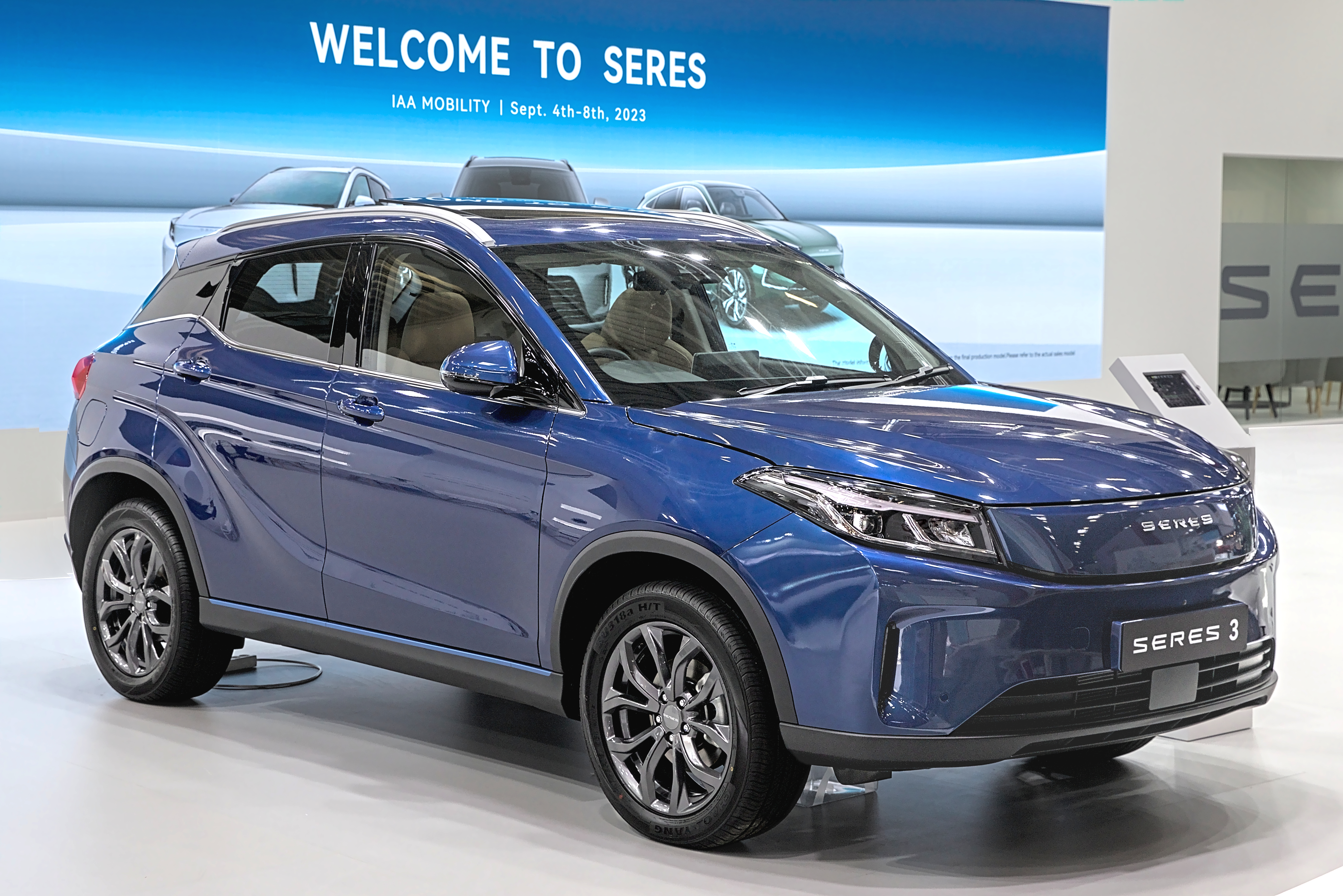
Seres 3 (facelift)

=== Landian E3 ===
The Landian E3 (蓝电E3) is the electric variant of the Fengon 500.

== Sales ==
500
Year	China
2022	17,790
2023	7,699
2024	4,133

E3
Year	China
Year	EREV
2022	3,183
2023	32
2024	794
2025	148
