= Fengon ix5 =

Compact crossover SUV

Fengon iX5
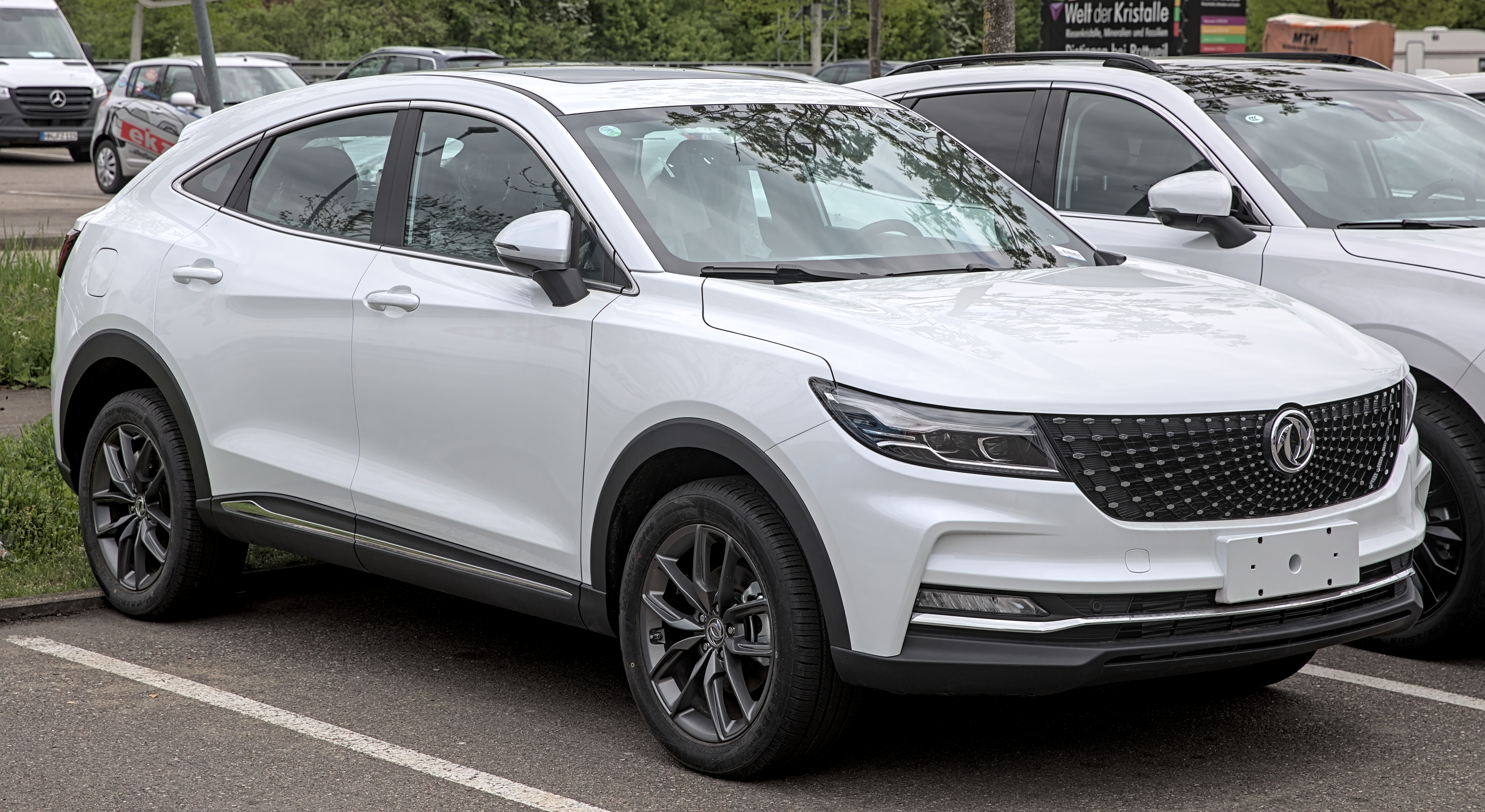
- Dongfeng Fengon 5 (Europe)

Overview
- Manufacturer: DFSK Motor
- Also called: DFSK Glory iX5 (Europe); DFSK Fengon iX5 (South Korea); DFSK F5 (Spain); Bahman Dignity Prime/Prestige (Iran); Cirelli Sport Coupe (Italy)
- Production: 2018–present 2020–2026 (Iran)
- Model years: 2018–present
- Assembly: China: Chongqing; Iran: Tehran (Bahman Group)

Body and chassis
- Class: Compact crossover SUV
- Body style: 5-door coupé SUV
- Layout: Front-engine, front-wheel-drive

Powertrain
- Engine: 1.5 L GDI Turbo I4 (petrol); 1.8 L GDI I4 (petrol); 2.0 L GDI Turbo I4 (petrol)
- Transmission: 5-speed manual; CVT; 6-speed automatic

Dimensions
- Wheelbase: 2,790 mm (109.8 in)
- Length: 4,685 mm (184.4 in)
- Width: 1,865 mm (73.4 in)
- Height: 1,645 mm (64.8 in)

The Fengguang iX5 (or Fengon iX5, 风光ix5 in Chinese) is a compact crossover SUV produced by the Chinese automaker Dongfeng Motor Co., Ltd., under the Dongfeng Sokon (DFSK) sub-brand since 2018. First shown at the 2018 Beijing Auto Show in China, the iX5 features a coupe-like styling.

== Overview ==
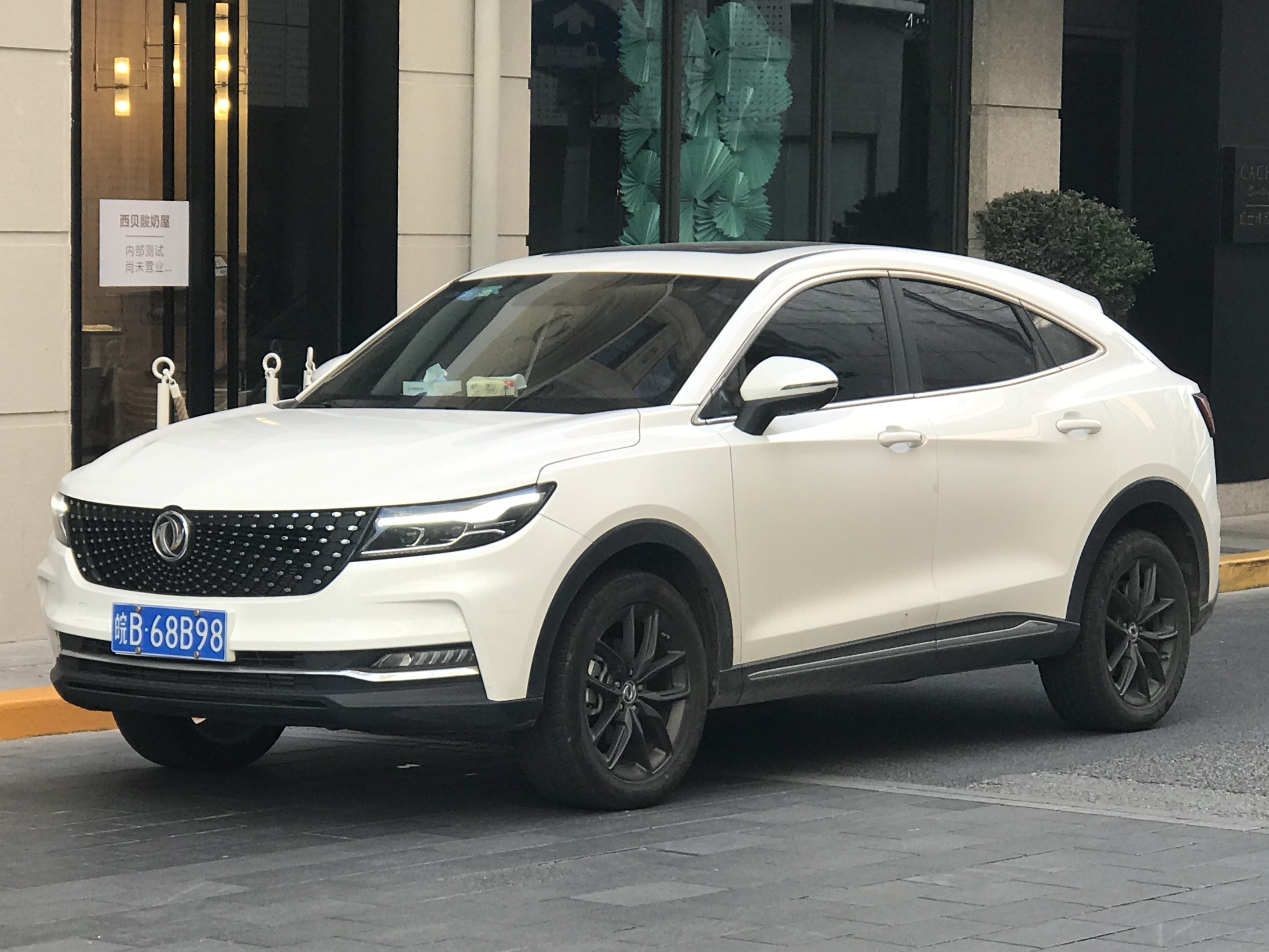
Fengguang ix5 (China)

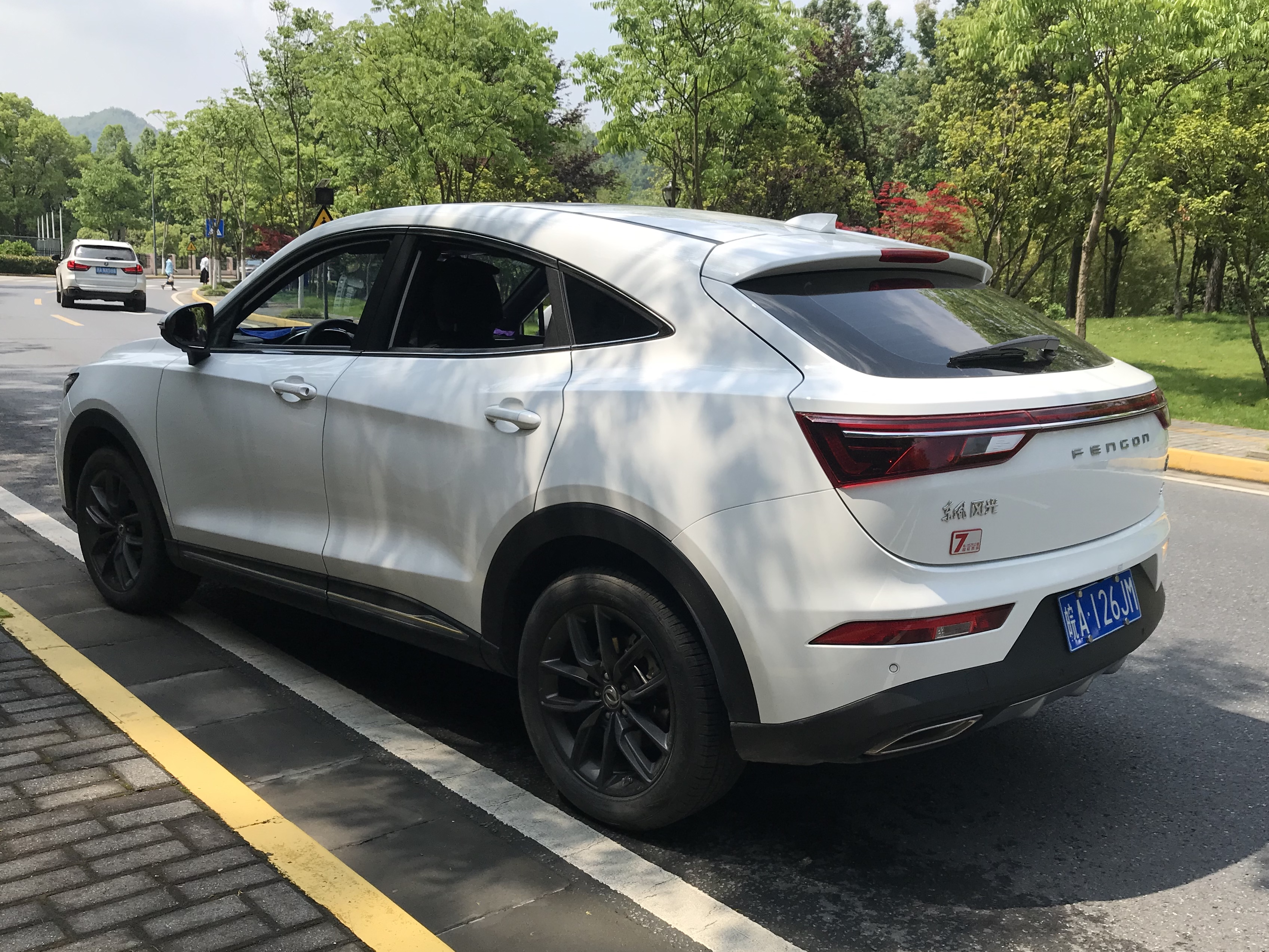
Rear view

The Fengguang iX5 was launched in the Chinese market in Q4 2018 with pricing starting from 99,800 yuan to 149,800 yuan.

Engines of the iX5 includes a 1.5-liter turbo producing 150 hp and 220 Nm of torque, and a 1.8-liter producing 139 hp and 187 Nm of torque. Transmission options includes a 5-speed manual gearbox or CVT. The operating system of the iX5 features the Baidu Apollo, the artificial intelligence suite developed by Baidu for autonomous driving.

The Fengguang iX5 was later debuted to the South Korean market on 10 October 2019 by DFSK's South Korean official distributor, Shinwon CK Motors. It is known there as the DFSK Fengon iX5. It was also released in Morocco as the DFSK Glory iX5 on 21 February 2020.

In Europe it is sold renamed DFSK F5 (Fengon 5) and the first exports started in Spain and Germany in May 2020. The European engine is the Euro 6D-Temp approved 1.5 Turbo four-cylinder of Mitsubishi origin which delivers 137 horsepower with CVT gearbox produced by Punch Powertrain and front-wheel drive. The engine is also available in dual-fuel version with LPG kit. In Italy was sold as a DFSK Glory F5 and by Cirelli Motor Company rebadged as a Cirelli Sport Coupé.

== Sales ==
Year	China
2018	8,689
2019	16,213
2020	5,132
2021	3,620
2022	6,497
2023	5,892
2024	4,298
2025	3
