= Fengon Mini EV =

Battery electric city car

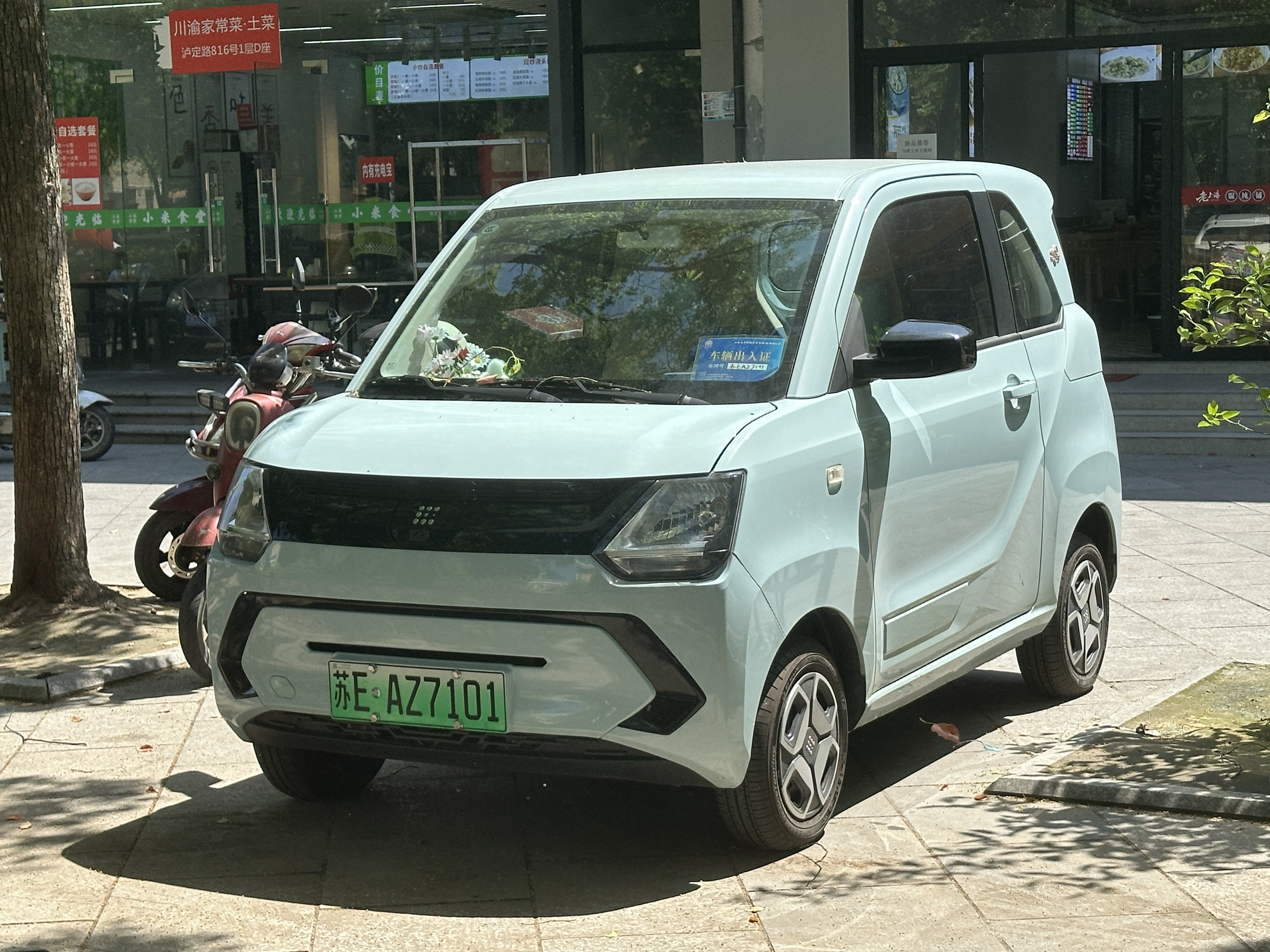

Overview
- Manufacturer: DFSK Motor
- Also called: Avantier EX; Daehan Sweety (Laos); DFSK Candy (Philippines); DFSK Sokon Candy; Ecocar G300 (Greece); Fengon Mini EV Candy; GuGo GIGI EV (Pakistan); Seres E1 (Indonesia)
- Production: 2022–present
- Assembly: China: Chongqing; Indonesia: Serang, Banten (Sokonindo Automobile)

Body and chassis
- Class: City car (A)
- Body style: 3-door hatchback
- Layout: Rear-engine, rear-wheel-drive

Powertrain
- Electric motor: Permanent magnet synchronous
- Power output: 25–30 kW (34–40 hp; 34–41 PS)
- Transmission: 1-speed direct-drive
- Battery: 9.6 kWh LFP; 13.8 kWh LFP; 16.8 kWh LFP
- Electric range: 120–220 km (75–137 mi) (NEDC)

Dimensions
- Wheelbase: 1,960 mm (77.2 in)
- Length: 2,995 mm (117.9 in)
- Width: 1,495 mm (58.9 in)
- Height: 1,640 mm (64.6 in)
- Curb weight: 675–730 kg (1,488–1,609 lb)

The Fengon Mini EV is a battery electric city car manufactured by DFSK Motor since 2022.

== Overview ==
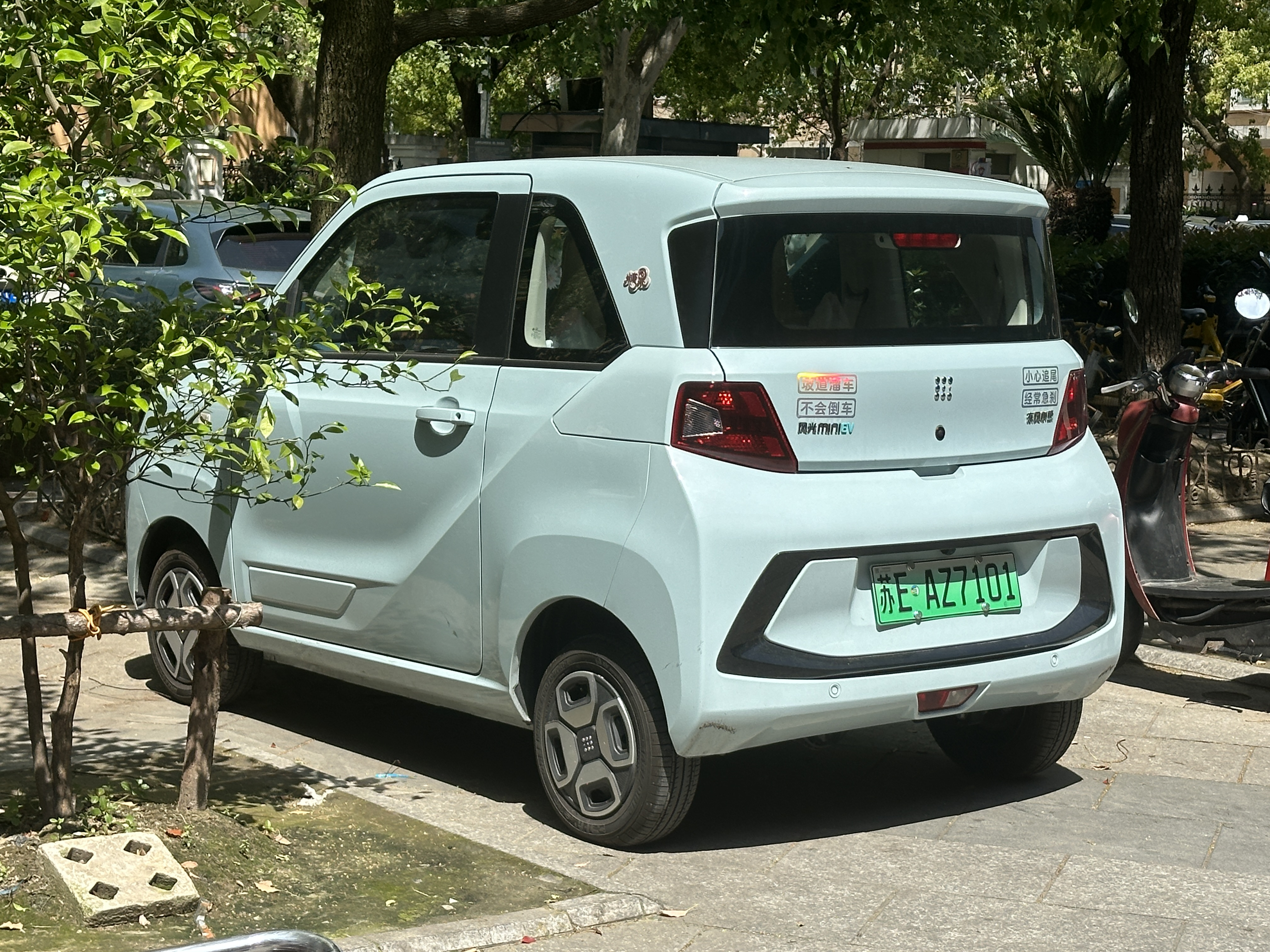
Rear view

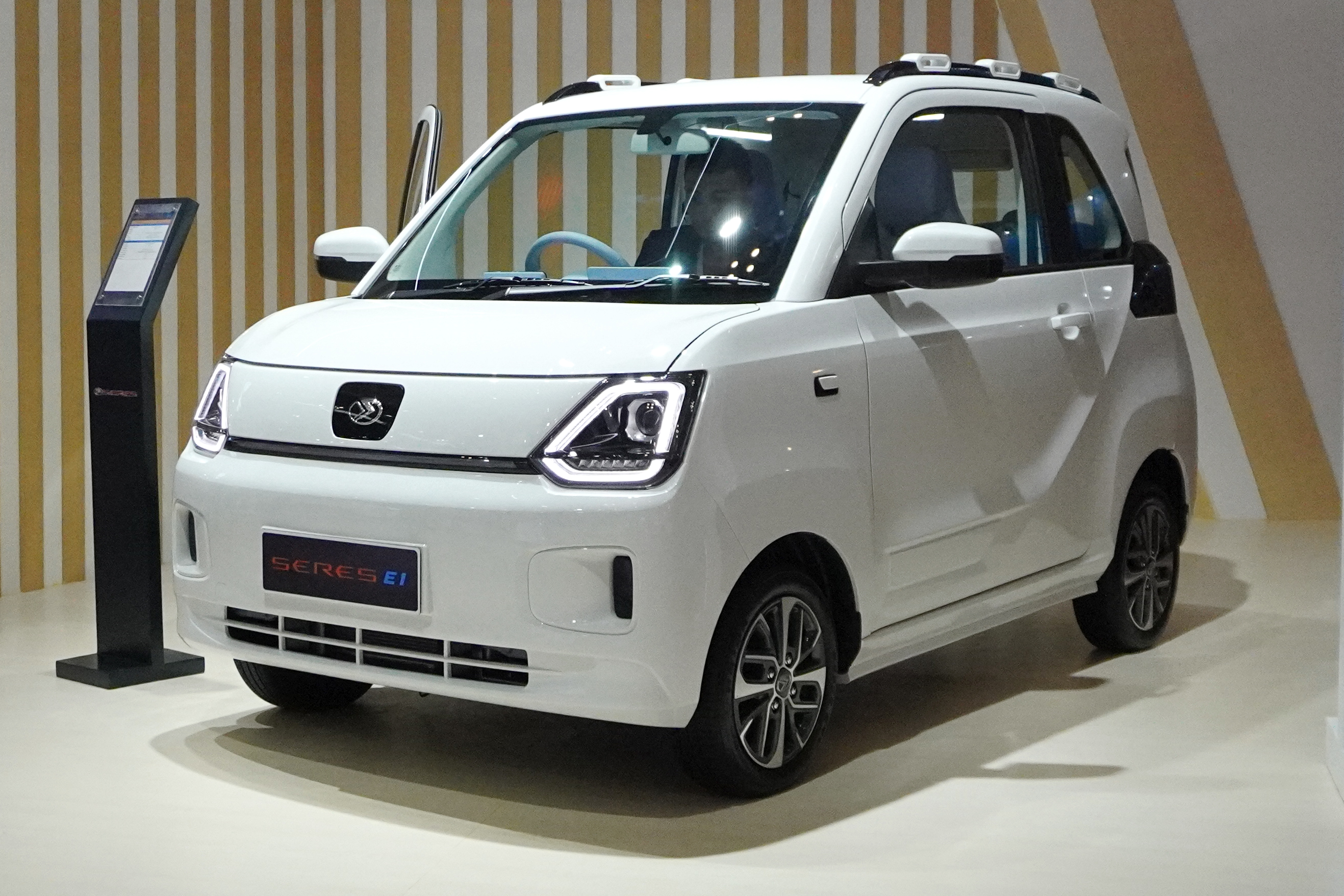
Seres E1 (Indonesia)

The Fengon Mini EV was branded as the DFSK Sokon Candy by DFSK (Dongfeng Sokon Automobile) while displaying the Seres logo when images first emerged in September 2021. The Chinese domestic market version was officially launched in the first quarter of 2022 under the Fengon (Fengguang) or Glory brand, while being badged with the Dianlan series logo. It was intended to compete with the slightly smaller and similarly shaped Wuling Hongguang Mini EV.

== Specifications ==
The Fengon Mini EV has three LFP battery pack options supplied by CATL or Gotion, with capacities of 9.18 kWh, 13.8 kWh, or 16.8 kWh providing a range of 120 km (75 mi), 180 km (110 mi), or 220 km (140 mi) respectively. It is powered by a permanent magnet synchronous motor driving the rear wheels, with the two smaller battery versions using a 25 kW (34 hp; 34 PS) unit supplied by Zhejiang Founder, while the largest battery comes with a 30 kW (40 hp; 41 PS) unit made by SAIC; both versions output 100 N⋅m (74 lb⋅ft) of torque and have a top speed of 100 km/h (62 mph).

== Markets ==
=== Indonesia ===
The Mini EV was unveiled in the Indonesia on 17 May 2023 as the Seres E1, as part of introduction of the Seres brand in Indonesia. The Seres E1 was launched in Indonesia on 10 August 2023 at the 30th Gaikindo Indonesia International Auto Show. It is available in B and L types. B type use a 13.8 kWh battery, while the L type use a 16.8 kwh battery.

=== Philippines ===
The Mini EV was launched in the Philippines on 8 September 2024 as the DFSK Candy, as part of DFSK Motors entry to the Philippines.

== Sales ==
Year	China
2022	12,763
2023	1,083
2024	701
