= SUV =

Type of automobile

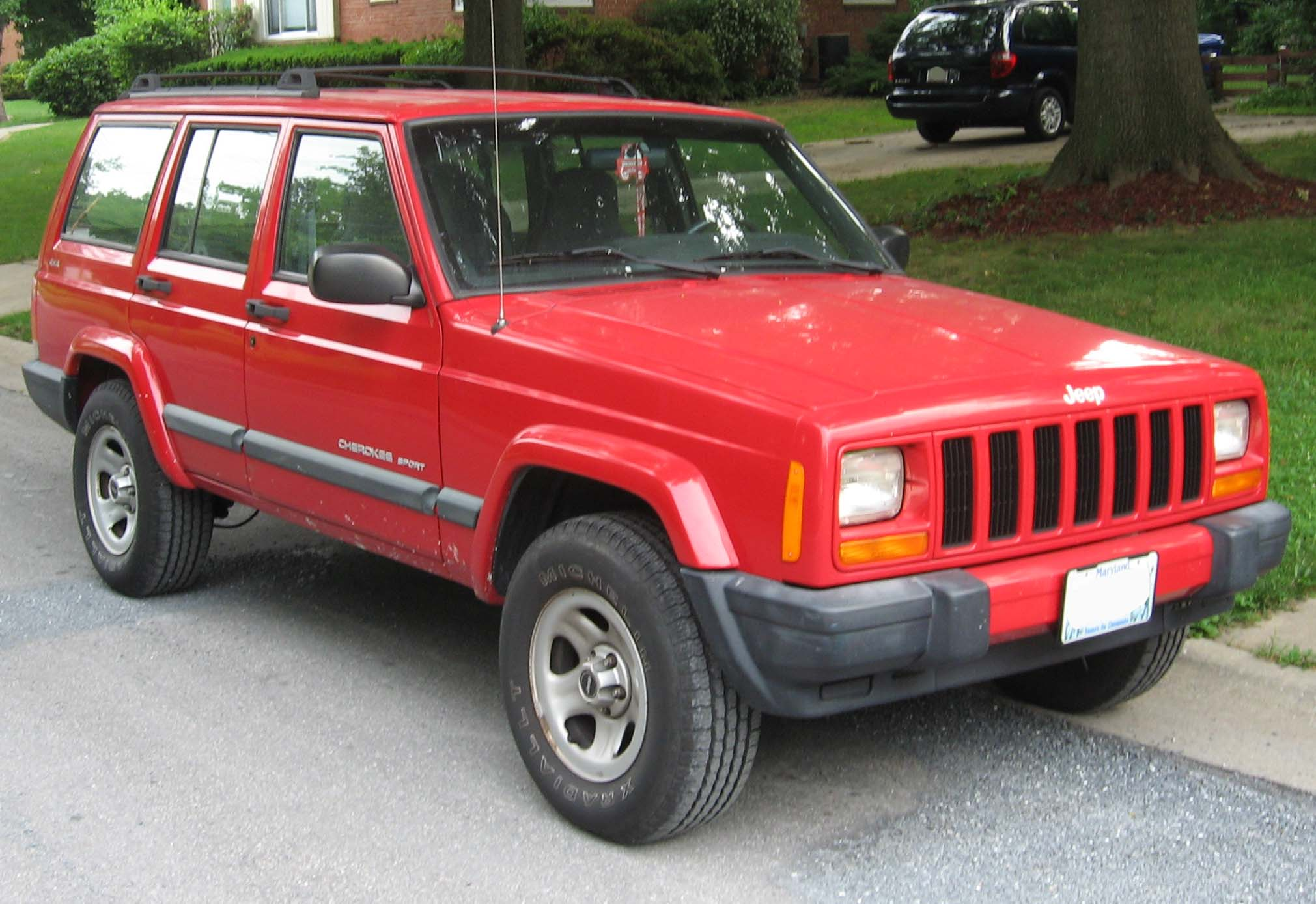
1997–2001 Jeep Cherokee compact SUV

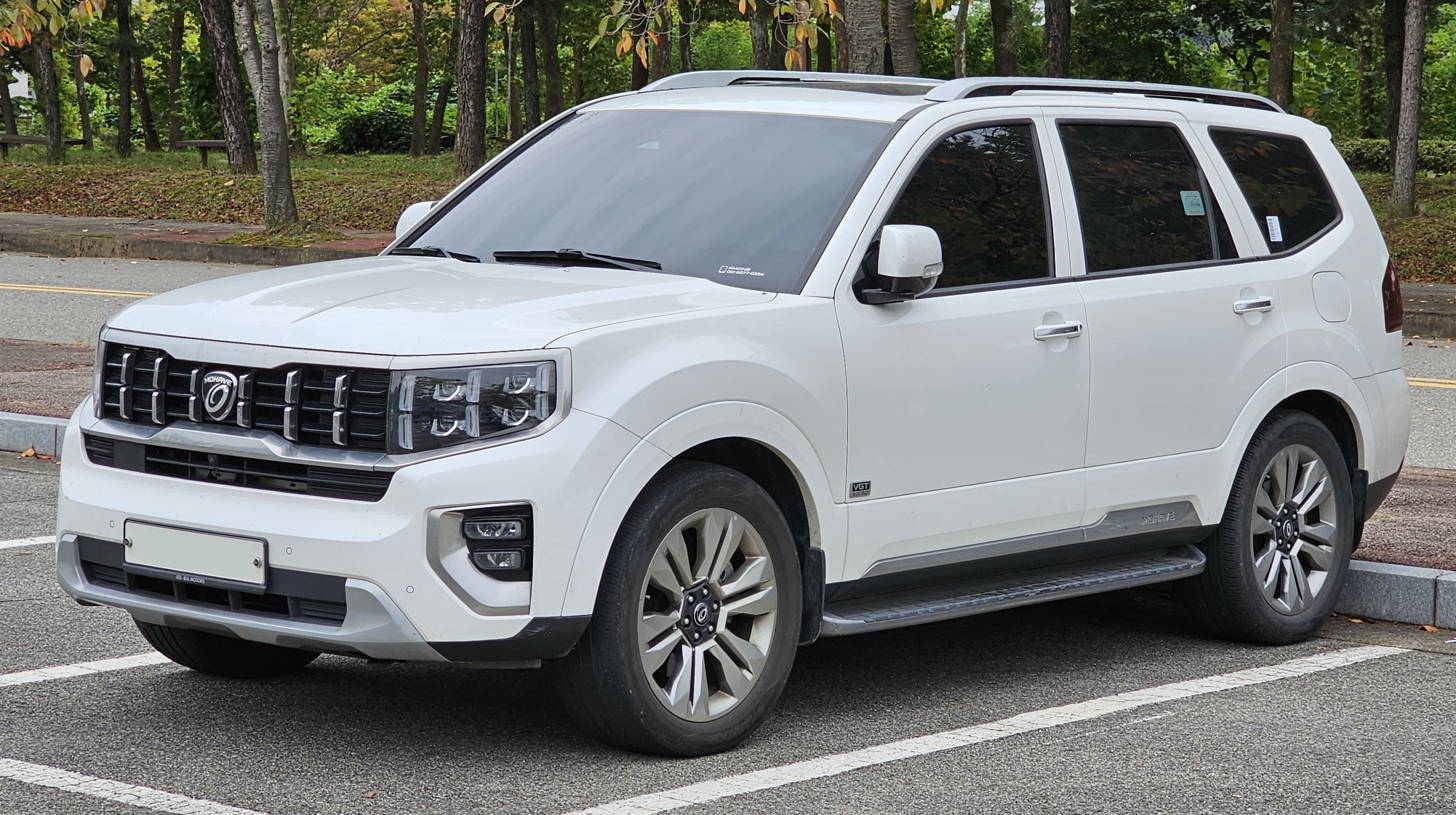
2020–2024 Kia Mohave mid-size SUV

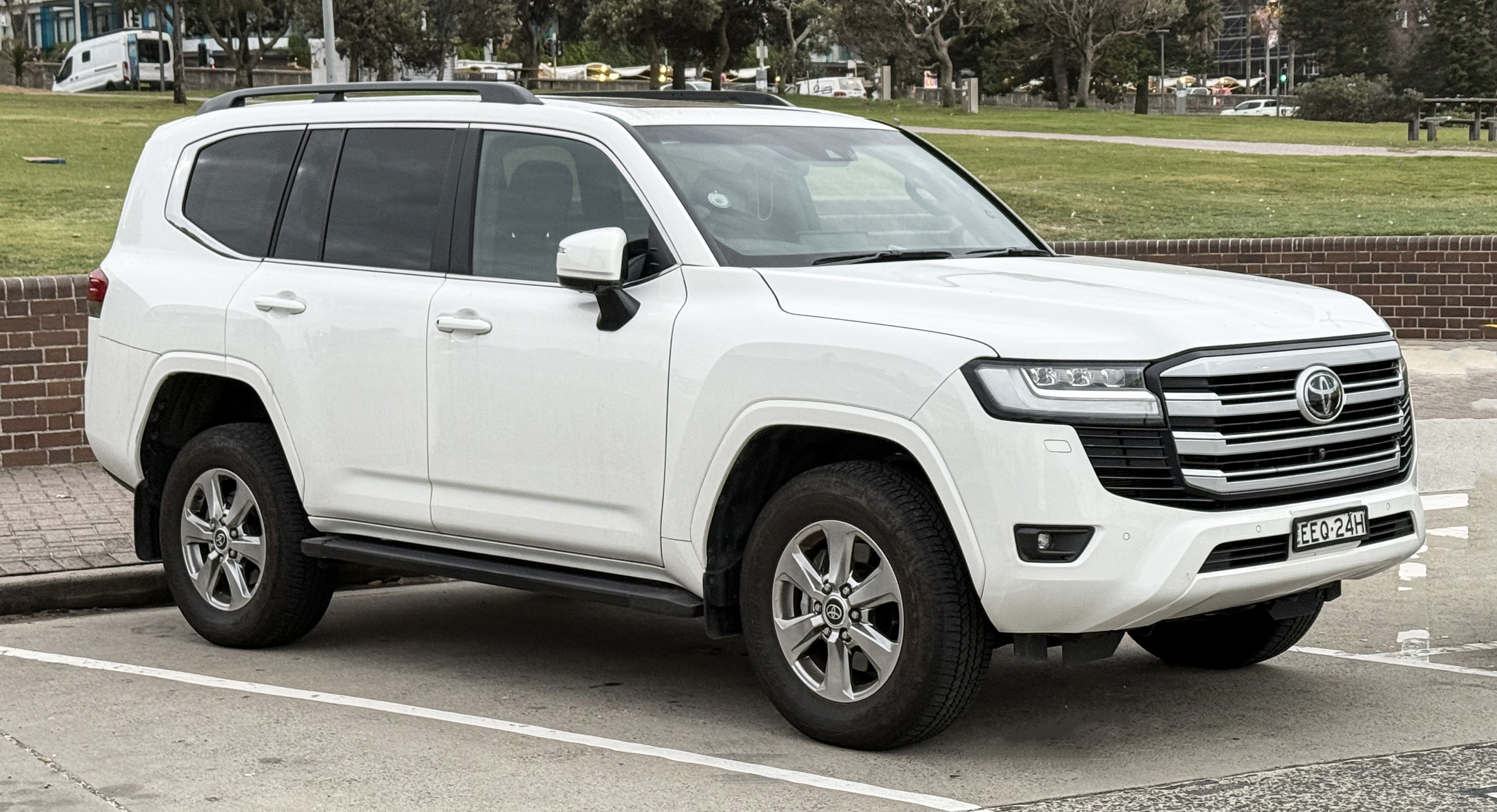
2024 Toyota Land Cruiser large SUV

A sport utility vehicle (SUV) is a car classification that combines elements of road-going passenger cars with features from off-road vehicles, such as raised ground clearance and four-wheel drive.

There is no commonly agreed-upon definition of an SUV, and the term's usage varies across countries. Thus, it is "a loose term that traditionally covers a broad range of vehicles with four-wheel drive." Some definitions claim that an SUV must be built on a light truck chassis; however, broader definitions consider any vehicle with off-road design features to be an SUV. A crossover SUV is often defined as an SUV built with a unibody construction (as with passenger cars); however, the designations are increasingly blurred because of the capabilities of the vehicles, the labelling by marketers, and the electrification of new models.

The predecessors to SUVs date back to military and low-volume models from the late 1930s, and the four-wheel-drive station wagons and carryalls that began to be introduced in 1949. Some SUVs produced today use unibody construction; however, in the past, more SUVs used body-on-frame construction. During the late 1990s and early 2000s, SUV popularity increased significantly, often at the expense of sedans and station wagons. SUVs accounted for 45.9% of the world's passenger car market in 2021, and are particularly popular in the United States, where they made up 57.3% of sales. They typically have significantly higher profit margins for automakers, which have promoted them by appealing to machismo.

SUVs have been criticized for a variety of environmental and safety-related reasons. They generally have poorer fuel efficiency and require more resources to manufacture than smaller vehicles, contributing more to climate change and environmental degradation. Between 2010 and 2018, SUVs were the second-largest contributor to the global increase in carbon emissions worldwide. Their higher center of gravity increases their risk of rollovers. Their larger blind spots make them more likely to run over pedestrians, and their higher front-end profile makes them at least twice as likely to kill those they hit. Additionally, the psychological sense of security they provide influences drivers to drive less cautiously, and may in turn cause others with smaller vehicles to opt for SUVs in the future under the sense of security. Because they take up more space, they worsen traffic congestion and reduce parking availability.

== Definitions ==
There is no universally accepted definition of the sport utility vehicle. Dictionaries, automotive experts, and journalists use varying wordings and defining characteristics, in addition to regional variations of usage by both the media and the general public. The auto industry also has not settled on one definition of the SUV.

=== Australia ===
In Australia, SUVs are recognized as a distinct vehicle type in both market statistics and government classifications. The Australian Bureau of Statistics (ABS) defines sport utility vehicles as vehicles designed for off-road use with features such as increased ground clearance and a wagon-style body configuration, while also including certain two-wheel drive variants. SUVs and many four-wheel drive vehicles are also classified as passenger vehicles under Australia's New Vehicle Efficiency Standard framework.

In Australia, SUV sales were helped by having lower import duties than passenger cars. Up until January 2010, SUVs were subject to a 5% import tariff, compared with 10% for passenger cars.

=== Europe ===
In Europe, the term SUV is primarily used as a market segment classification rather than a separate legal vehicle category. In European automotive segmentation, the J-segment represents sport utility vehicles and similar vehicles. However, European Union vehicle approval regulations classify vehicles using regulatory categories such as category M for passenger vehicles rather than using SUV as a legal classification.

In Paris in February 2024, voters mandated a triple parking charge rate for SUVs, citing environmental impact and street capacity. It was implemented on 1 October 2024. Visitors driving vehicles over 1,600 kg (3,527 lb), or 2,000 kg (4,409 lb) for electric, pay €18 per hour in central Paris and €12 in outer districts; residents and professionals are exempt. This followed similar decisions in Lyon and Tübingen with similar ordinances being considered by London, Brussels and Amsterdam.

=== India ===
In India, SUVs are generally classified within the broader "utility vehicle" category for regulatory purposes. Under India's Goods and Services Tax (GST) framework, sport utility vehicles (SUVs), multi utility vehicles (MUVs), multi-purpose vehicles (MPVs), and crossover utility vehicles (XUVs) are included within the utility vehicle category. Vehicles meeting specific criteria, including engine capacity above 1,500 cc (91.5 cu in), length greater than 4,000 mm (157.5 in) and ground clearance of at least 170 mm (6.7 in), are subject to the applicable GST classification for utility vehicles.

=== New Zealand ===
In New Zealand, vehicles commonly associated with SUVs are classified within the broader regulatory category of passenger vehicles. The New Zealand Transport Agency (NZTA) defines class MC as an "off-road passenger vehicle", referring to passenger vehicles designed with special features for off-road operation and having no more than nine seating positions, including the driver. Vehicles in this category must meet specified requirements related to off-road capability, including criteria such as four-wheel-drive capability, approach angle, departure angle, breakover angle, and ground clearance.

=== United Kingdom ===
In British English, terminology for this class of vehicle overlaps with terms such as "4x4" and "off-roader". Collins defines an SUV as a powerful four-wheel-drive vehicle capable of being driven over rough ground, and defines an off-roader as a vehicle designed to travel over rough ground. The sardonic term "Chelsea tractor" is also commonly used, due to the perceived popularity of the vehicles with urban residents of Chelsea, London, and their likeness to vehicles used by farmers.

The Collins English Dictionary defines a sport utility vehicle as a "powerful vehicle with four-wheel drive that can be driven over rough ground. The abbreviation SUV is often used."

=== United States ===
Automotive websites' descriptions of SUVs range from specifically "combining car-like appointments and wagon practicality with steadfast off-road capability" with "chair-height seats and picture-window visibility" to the more general "nearly anything with available all-wheel drive and raised ground clearance". It is also suggested that the term "SUV" has replaced "jeep" as a general term for off-road vehicles.

American dictionary definitions for SUVs include:

- "rugged automotive vehicle similar to a station wagon but built on a light-truck chassis"
- "automobile similar to a station wagon but built on a light truck frame"
- "large vehicle that is designed to be used on rough surfaces but that is often used on city roads or highways"
- "passenger vehicle similar to a station wagon but with the chassis of a small truck and, usually, four-wheel drive"

In the EPA's regulatory vehicle categories, truck SUVs accounted for 1.7% of new light-duty vehicles produced for sale in the United States in model year 1975 and 49.6% in model year 2024.

EPA production share for truck SUVs among new light-duty vehicles produced for sale in the United States, measured as a percentage by model year. The source reports selected model years through 2005 and annual model years from 2010; the chart includes finalized data through 2024 and excludes preliminary model year 2025. The truck-SUV category follows EPA regulatory car-and-truck definitions and does not represent all SUVs.

Raw data

In the United States, many government regulations simply have categories for "off-highway vehicles" which are loosely defined and often result in SUVs (along with pick-up trucks and minivans) being classified as light trucks. For example, corporate average fuel economy (CAFE) regulations previously included "permit greater cargo-carrying capacity than passenger carrying volume" in the definition for trucks, resulting in cars with removable rear seats, like the PT Cruiser, being classified as light trucks.

This classification as trucks allowed SUVs to be regulated less strictly than passenger cars under the Energy Policy and Conservation Act for fuel economy, and the Clean Air Act for emissions. However, from 2004 onwards, the United States Environmental Protection Agency (EPA) began to hold sport utility vehicles to the same tailpipe emissions standards as cars for criteria pollutants, though not greenhouse gas emissions standards as they were not set until 2010. In 2011, the CAFE regulations were changed to classify small, two-wheel-drive SUVs as passenger cars.

However, the licensing and traffic enforcement regulations in the United States vary from state to state, and an SUV may be classified as a car in some states but as a truck in others. For industry production statistics, SUVs are counted in the light truck product segment.

In the United States, local manufacturers of SUVs and light trucks are protected by the Chicken Tax, a 25% tariff on imported vehicles in the category enacted in 1964.

== Characteristics ==
=== Chassis ===
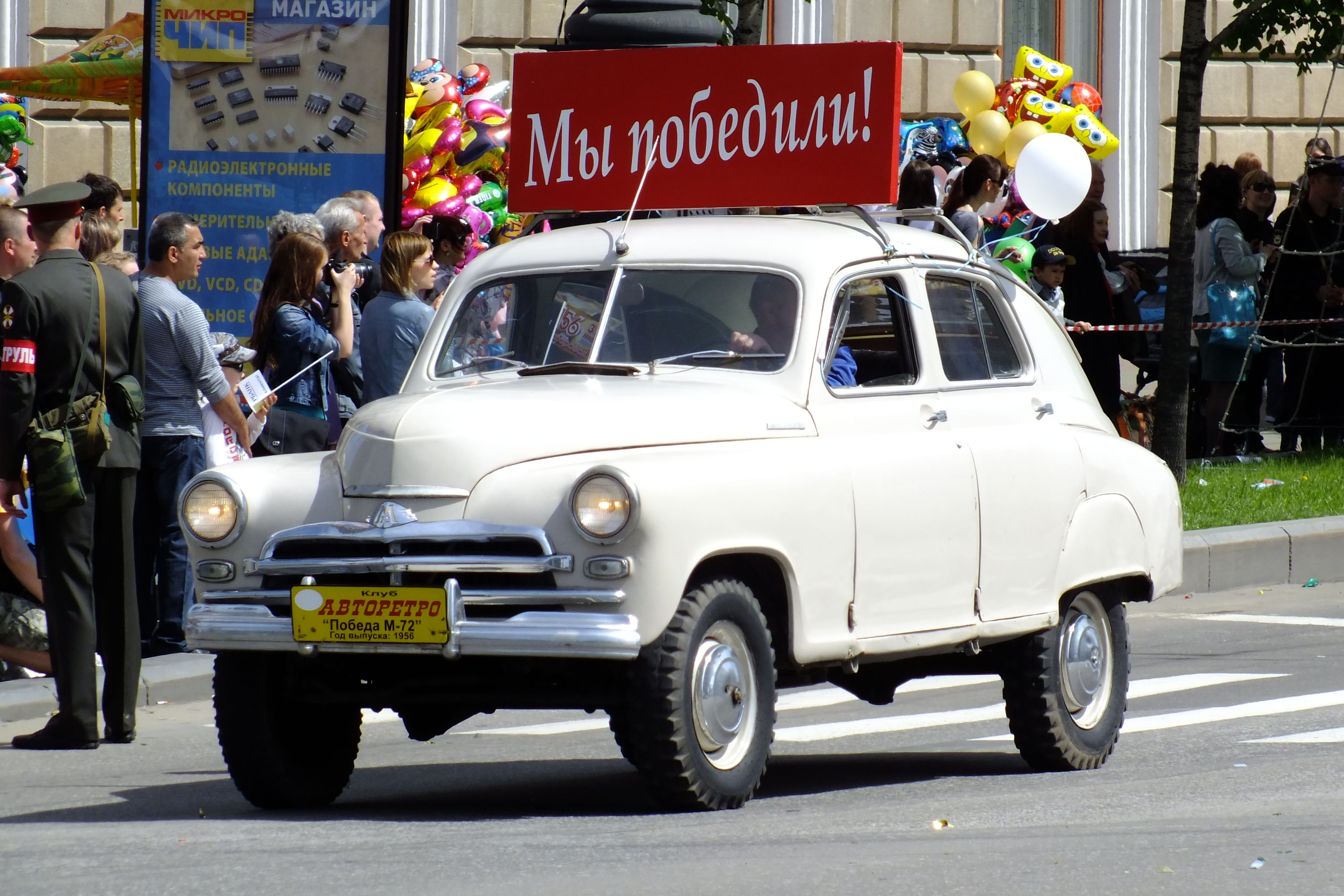
1955–1958 GAZ M-72 Pobeda

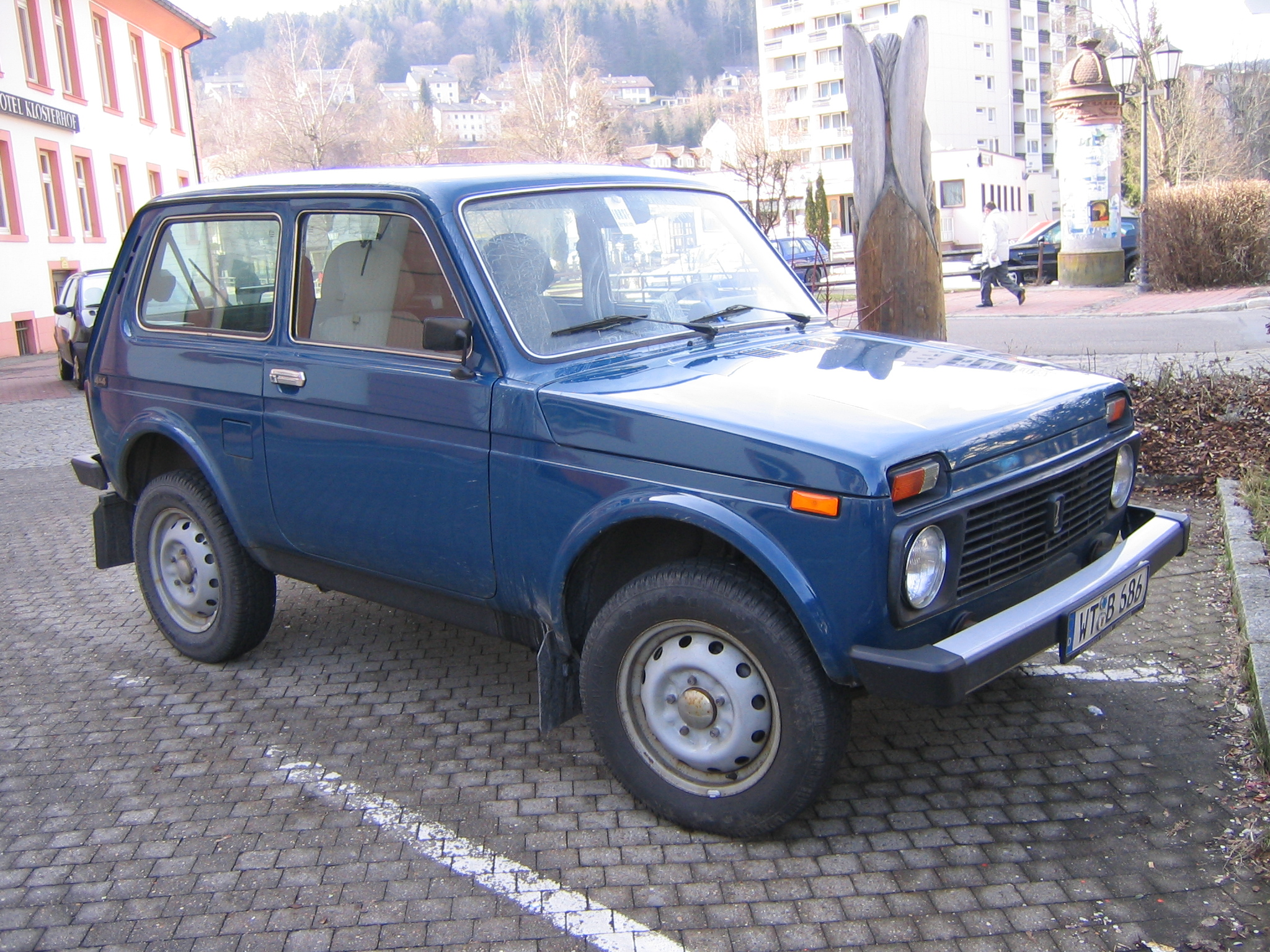
1977–1993 Lada Niva

Many years after most passenger cars had transitioned to unibody construction, most SUVs continued to use body-on-frame construction, as they were based on the chassis of a light truck, commercial vehicle, pickup truck, or off-road vehicle.

The first mass-produced unibody four-wheel-drive passenger car was the Russian 1955 GAZ-M20 Pobeda M-72, which could be considered the first crossover car. The 1977 Lada Niva was the first off-road vehicle to use both a unibody construction and a coil-sprung independent front suspension. The relatively compact Niva is considered a predecessor to the crossover SUV and combines a hatchback-like passenger car body with full-time four-wheel drive, low-range gearing, and a lockable center differential.

Nonetheless, unibody SUVs remained rare until the 1984 Jeep Cherokee (XJ) was introduced and became a sales success. The trend setting design was light, but strong, and smaller than the truck-based version it replaced, while having the same passenger and cargo-carrying capacity. The introduction of the 1993 Jeep Grand Cherokee (ZJ) resulted in many of Jeep's SUV models using unibody construction, with many other brands following suit since the mid-1990s. Today, most SUVs in production use a unibody construction, and relatively few models continue to use body-on-frame construction.

=== Body style ===
SUVs are typically of a two-box design similar to a station wagon. The engine compartment is in the front, followed by a combined passenger/cargo area (unlike a sedan, which has a separate trunk/boot compartment).

Up until approximately 2010, many SUV models were available in two-door body styles. Since then, manufacturers began to discontinue the two-door models as the four-door models became more popular.

A few two-door SUVs remain available, such as the body-on-frame Suzuki Jimny, Mahindra Thar, Toyota Land Cruiser Prado, Ford Bronco, and Jeep Wrangler as well as the Range Rover Evoque crossover SUV.

== Safety ==
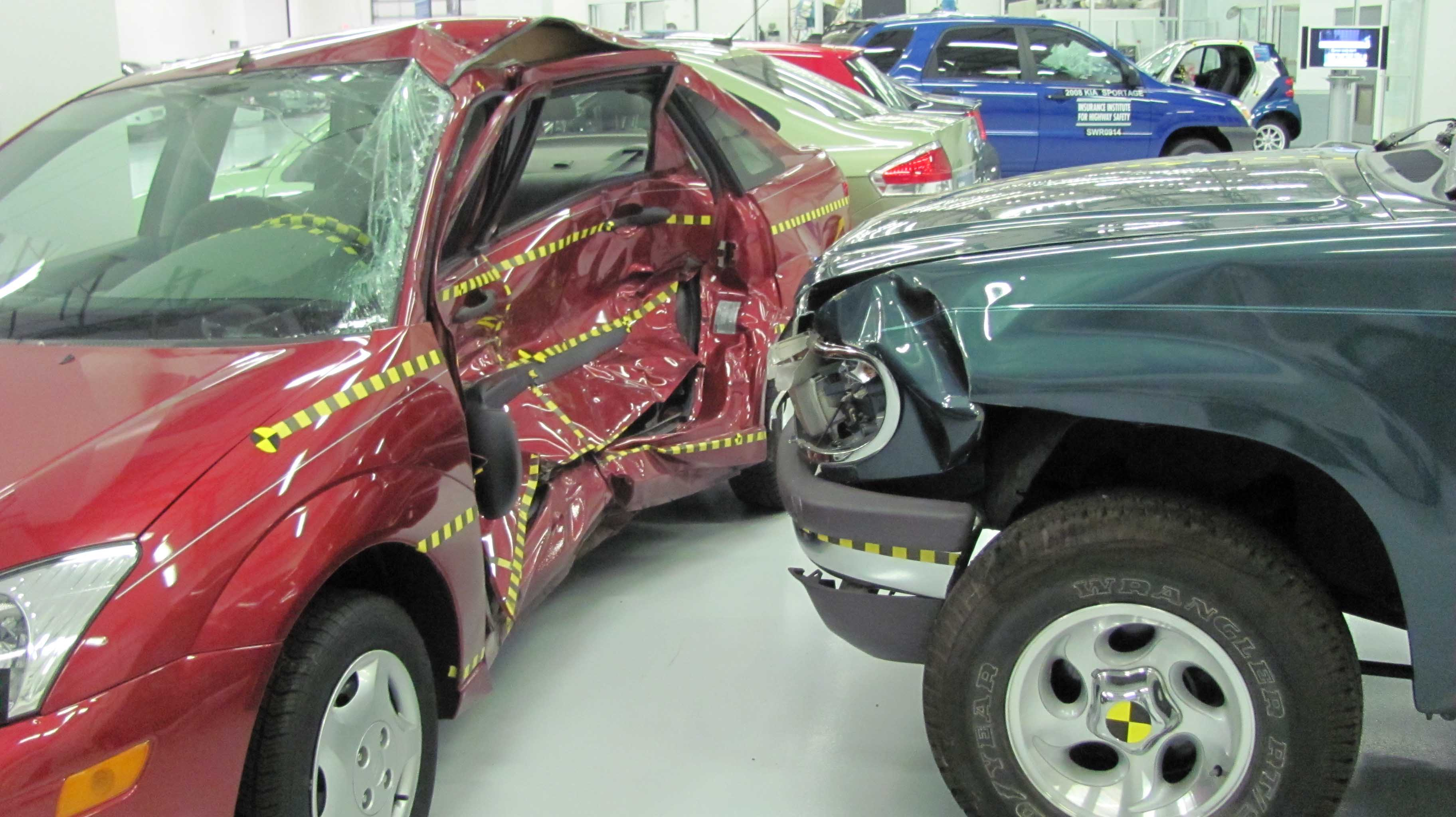
Side impact damage on a Ford Focus small car when struck by a Ford Explorer SUV

SUVs typically have high ground clearance and a tall body. This results in a high center of mass, which made SUVs more prone to roll-over accidents. In 2003, SUVs were quoted as 2.5 times more likely to roll over in a crash than regular cars.

Between 1991 and 2001, the United States saw a 150% increase in sport-utility vehicle rollover deaths. In 2001, though roll-overs constituted just 3% of vehicle crashes overall, they caused over 30% of occupant fatalities in crashes; and in crashes where the vehicle did roll over, SUV occupants in the early 2000s were nearly three times as likely to be killed as other car passengers. Vehicles with a high center of gravity do sometimes fail the moose test of maneuverability conducted by Swedish consumer magazine Teknikens Värld, for example, the 1997 Mercedes-Benz A-Class and 2011 Jeep Grand Cherokee.

The increasing popularity of SUVs in the 1990s and early 2000s was partly due to buyers perceiving that SUVs provide greater safety for occupants, due to their larger size and raised ride height. Regarding the safety of other road users, SUVs are exempted from U.S. regulation stating that a passenger car bumper must protect the area between 16 and 20 inches (41 and 51 cm) above the ground. This often increases the damage to the other car in a collision with an SUV, because the impact occurs at a higher location on the other car. In 2000–2001, 60% of fatal side-impact collisions were where the other vehicle was an SUV, an increase from 30% in 1980–1981.

The introduction of electronic stability control (ESC) and rollover mitigation, as well as increased analysis of the risks of a rollover, led the IIHS to report in 2015 that "the rollover death rate of 5 per million registered vehicle years for 2011 models is less than a quarter of what it was for 2004 models. With ESC dramatically reducing rollover risk, the inherent advantages offered by SUVs' greater size, weight, and height emerge more clearly. Today's SUVs have the lowest driver death rate of any vehicle type."

The high danger for cyclists and pedestrians of being seriously injured or even killed by SUV drivers has caused some public protests against SUVs in urban areas. In 2020, a study by the U.S.-based IIHS found that, of a sample of 79 crashes from three urban areas in Michigan, SUVs caused more serious injuries compared to cars when impacts occurred at greater than 31 km/h (19 mph). The IIHS noted the sample size of the study was small and that more research is needed. The popularity of SUVs contributed to an increase in pedestrian fatalities in the U.S. during the 2010s, alongside other factors such as distracted and drunk driving.

A 2021 study by the University of Illinois Springfield showed that SUVs are 8 times more likely to kill children in a collision than passenger cars, and multiple times more lethal to adult pedestrians and cyclists.

== Environmental impact ==
SUVs generally have poorer fuel efficiency than smaller cars, and thus contribute more to environmental degradation and global warming.

SUVs emit about 700 megatonnes of carbon dioxide per year, a gas which is linked to global warming. According to the International Energy Agency, from 2010 SUVs have been the second-largest contributor to the increase in global CO_{2} emissions, second only to the power sector.

SUVs were responsible for all of the 3.3 million barrels a day growth in oil demand from passenger cars between 2010 and 2018, whereas efficiency improvements in smaller cars saved over 2 million barrels a day, with electric cars reducing oil demand by under 100,000 barrels a day.

Whereas SUVs can be electrified, or converted to run on a variety of alternative fuels, including hydrogen, their (manufacturing) emissions will always be larger than smaller electric cars. On average, SUVs consume about a quarter more energy than medium-size cars. Furthermore, the vast majority of these vehicles are not converted to use alternative fuels.

Between 2010 and 2018 SUVs were the second largest contributor to the global increase in carbon emissions worldwide.

== Types of SUV ==
=== Crossover SUV ===
The "crossover SUV" segment (also known as "CUVs" or simply "crossovers") has become increasingly popular since around 2010. Crossovers are often based on a platform shared with a passenger car, as a result, they typically have better comfort and fuel economy, but less off-road capability (many crossovers are sold without all-wheel drive) than pickup truck-based SUVs.

The difference between crossovers and other SUVs is sometimes defined as a crossover being built using a unibody platform (the type used by most passenger cars), while an SUV is built using a body-on-frame platform (the type used by off-road vehicles and light trucks). However, these definitions are often blurred in practice, since unibody vehicles are also often referred to as SUVs. Also, crossover is a relatively recent term and early unibody SUVs (such as the 1984 Jeep Cherokee) are rarely called crossovers. Due to these inconsistencies, the term SUV is often used as a catch-all for both crossovers and SUVs.

Outside of the United States, the term crossover tends to be used for C-segment (compact) or smaller vehicles, with large unibody vehicles—such as the Mercedes-Benz GLS-Class, BMW X7, and Range Rover—usually referred to as SUVs rather than crossovers. In the United Kingdom, a crossover is sometimes defined as a hatchback model with raised ride height and SUV-like styling features.

Examples: Category:Crossover sport utility vehicles ( 79 )

=== Mini SUV ===
The smallest size class of SUVs is the "mini SUV". In Japan, SUVs under 3,400 mm (133.9 in)—such as the Mitsubishi Pajero Mini—are included in the kei car category and therefore attract lower taxes.

Many recent vehicles labeled as mini SUVs are technically subcompact crossovers and are built on the platform of a subcompact (also called supermini or B-segment) passenger car.

Examples: Category:Mini sport utility vehicles ( 52 )

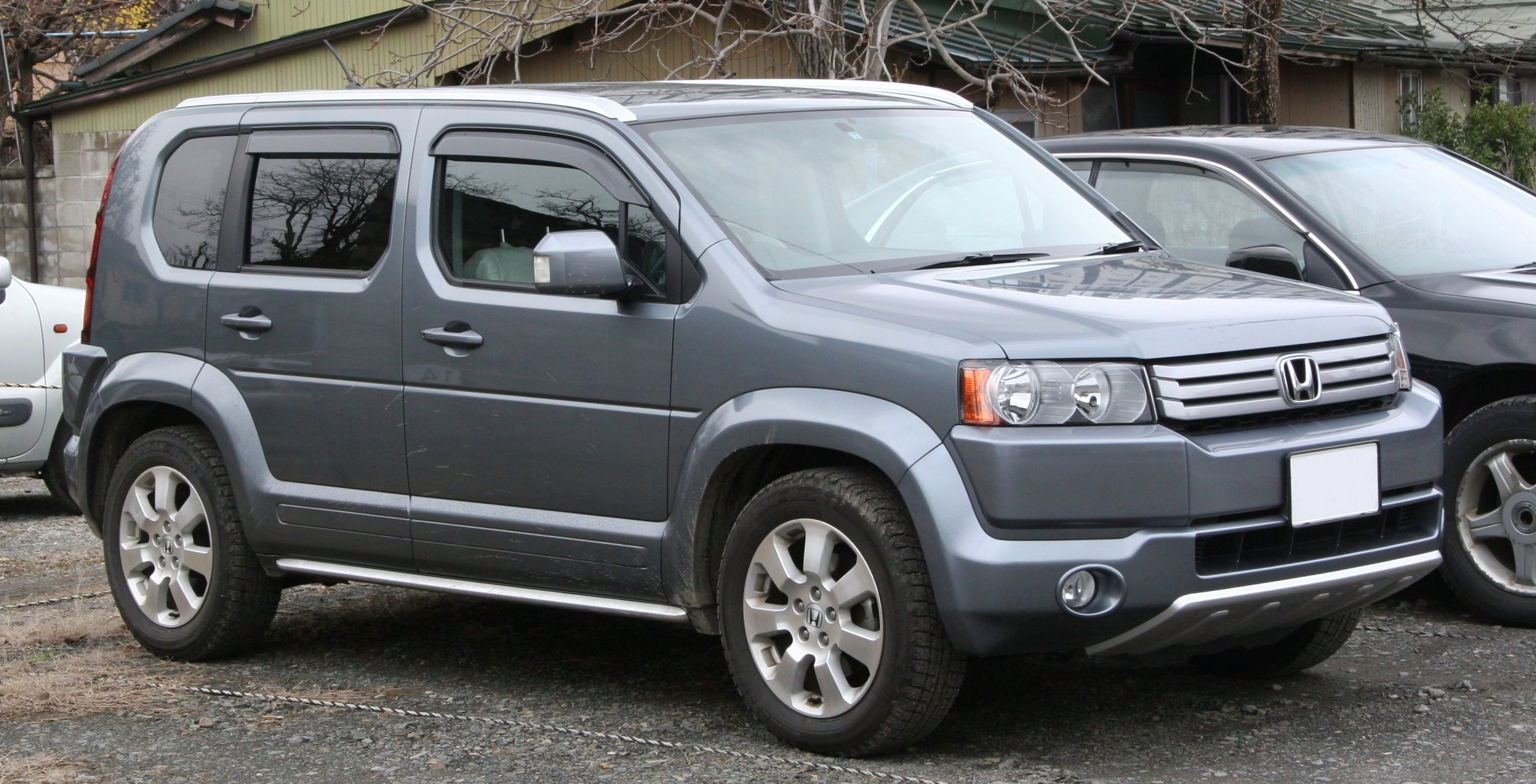
Honda Crossroad, mini SUV

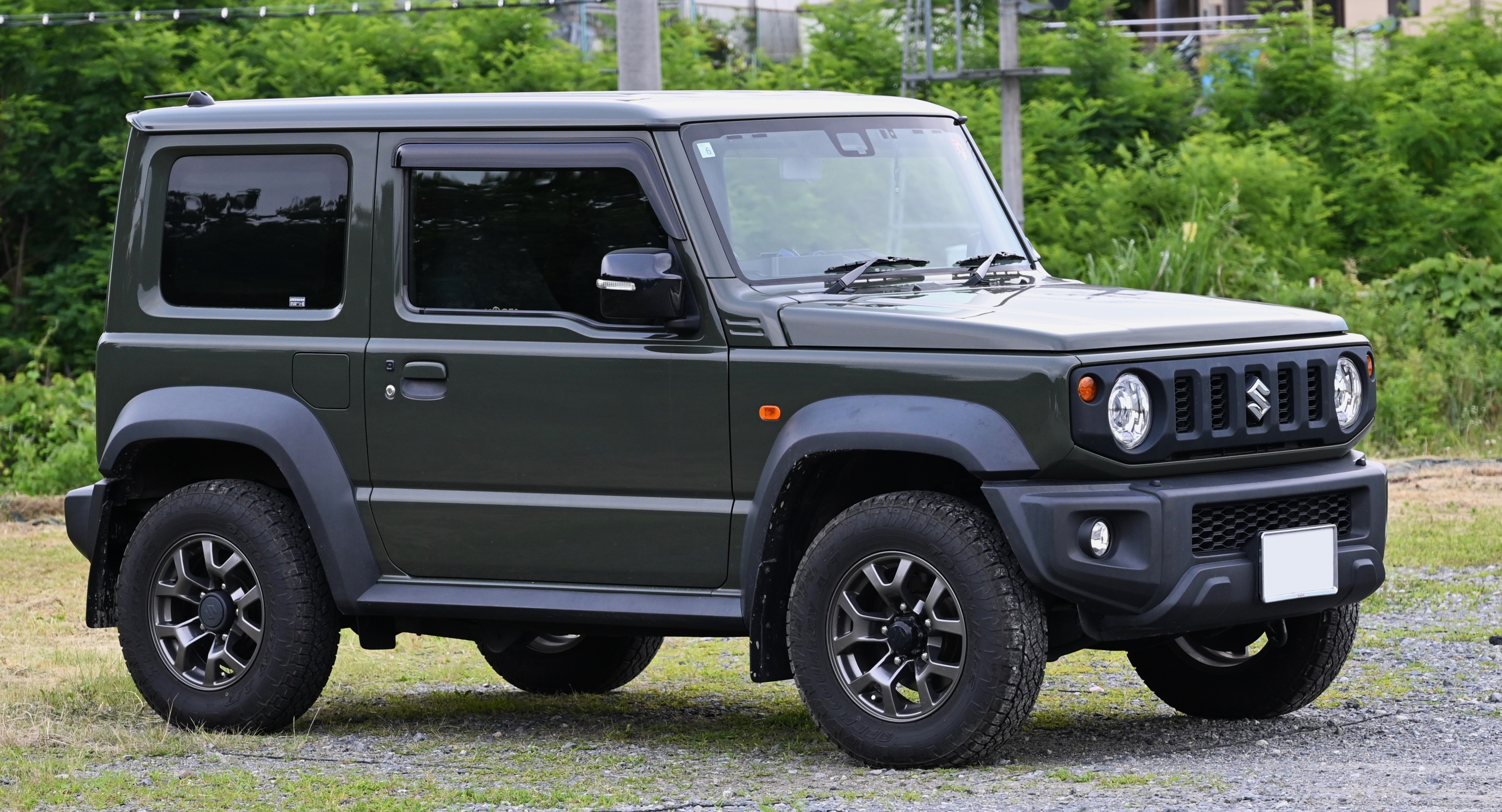
Suzuki Jimny, off-road mini SUV

=== Compact SUV ===
The "compact SUV" is the next bigger-size class after mini SUVs.

Many recent vehicles labeled as compact SUVs are technically compact crossovers and are built on the platform of a compact (C-segment) passenger car.

Examples: Category:Compact sport utility vehicles ( 65 )

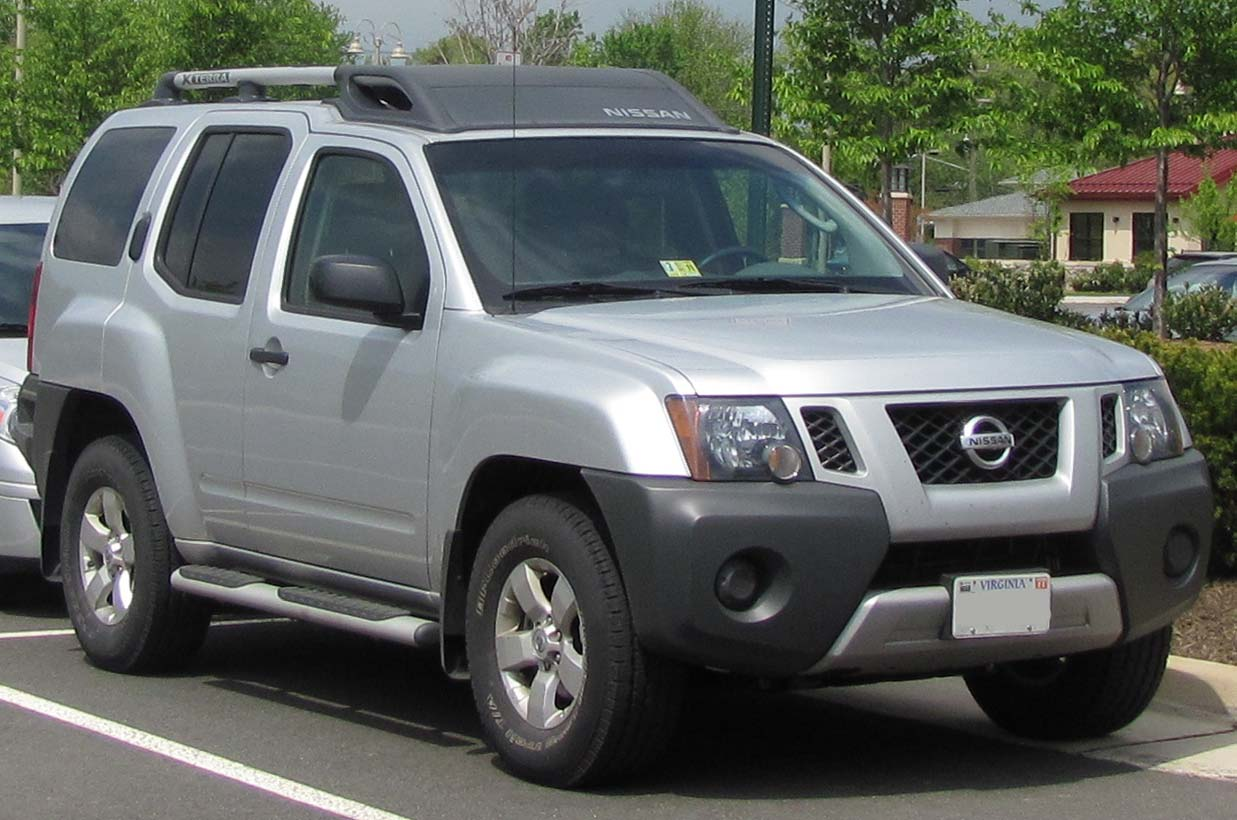
Nissan Xterra, compact truck-based SUV

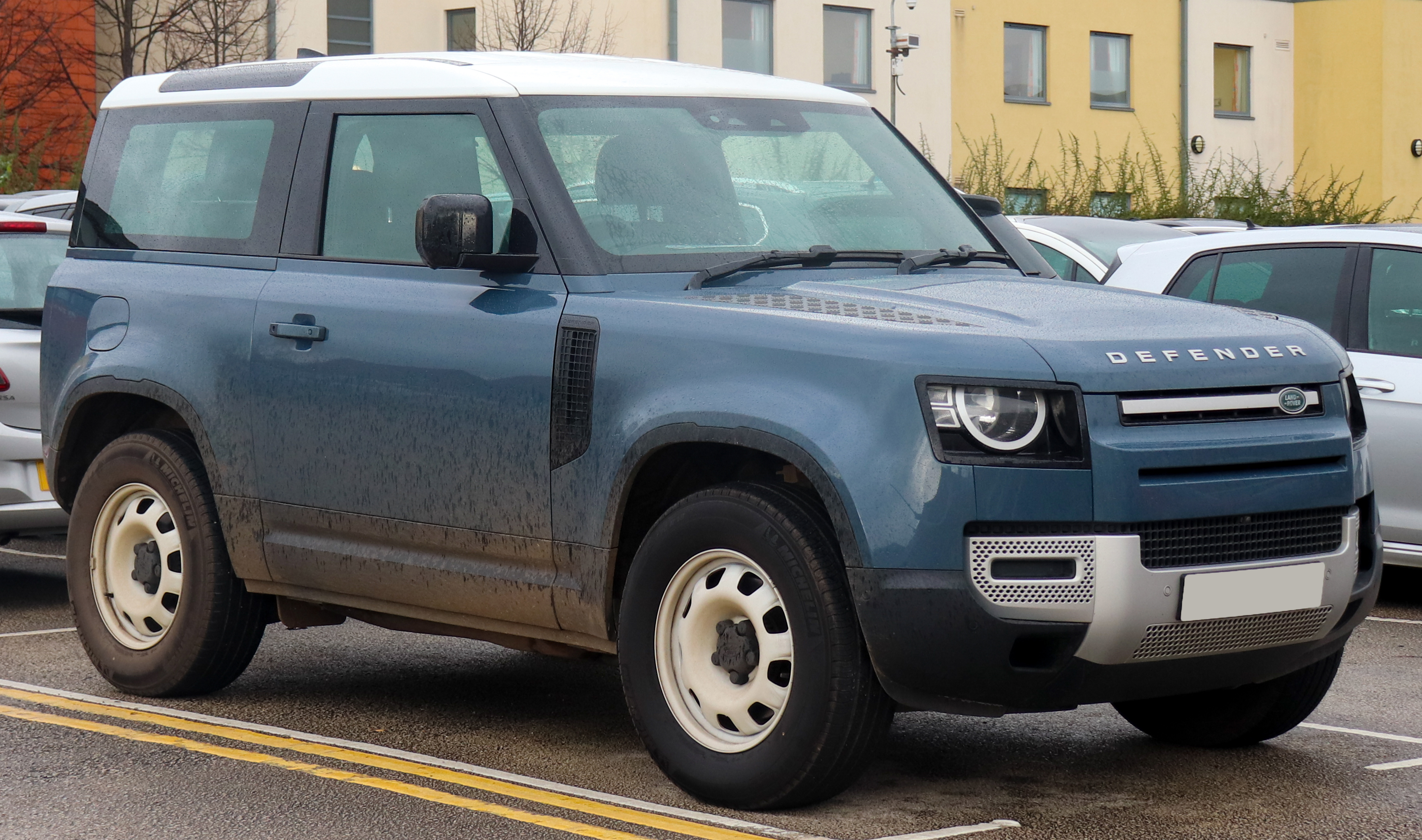
Land Rover Defender 90

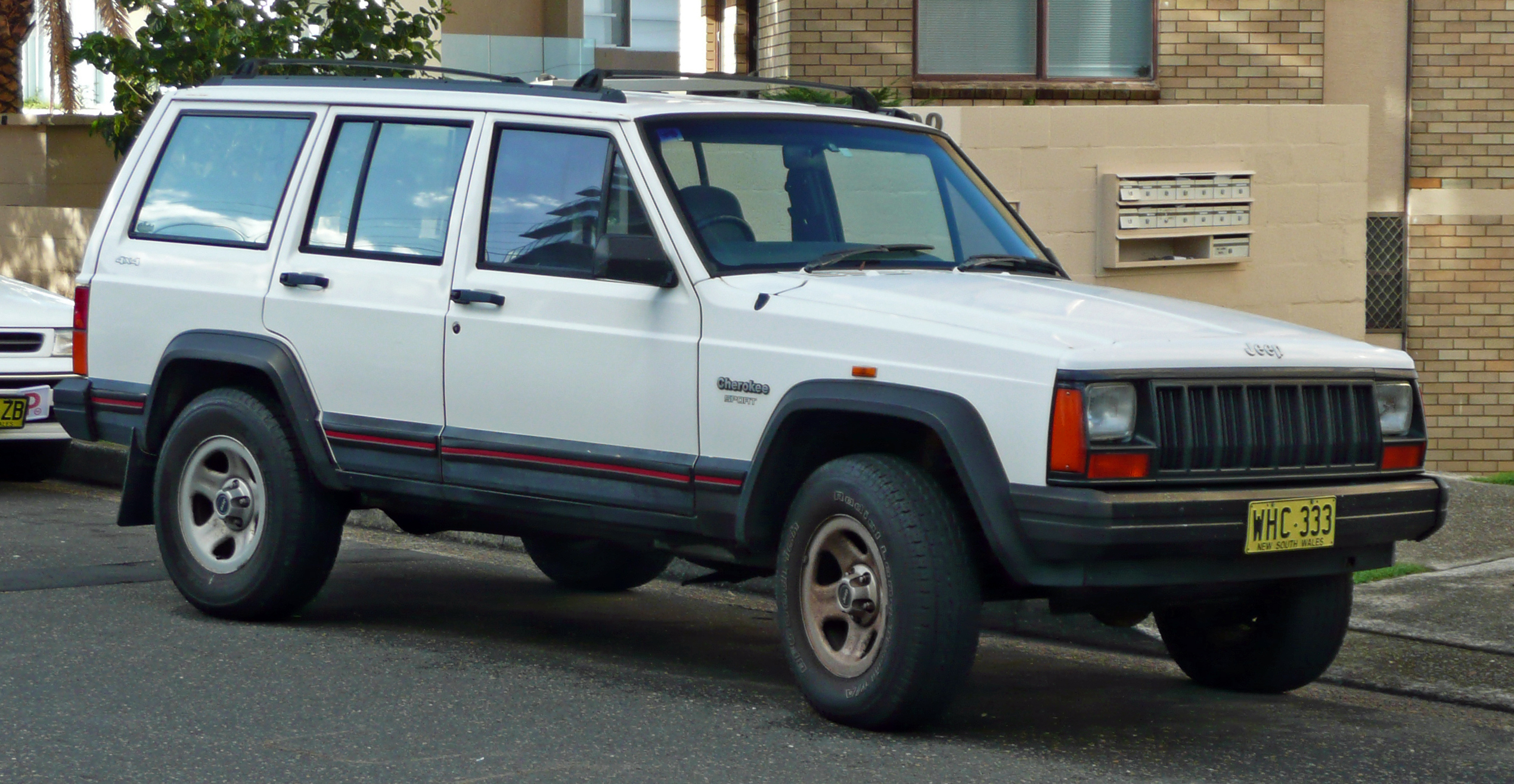
Jeep Cherokee, unibody SUV

=== Mid-size SUV ===
The next larger size is called the "mid-size SUV". Some mid-size SUVs are based on platforms shared with passenger cars and therefore, are crossovers. Other mid-size SUVs are based on compact or mid-size pickups.

Examples: Category:Mid-size sport utility vehicles ( 115 )

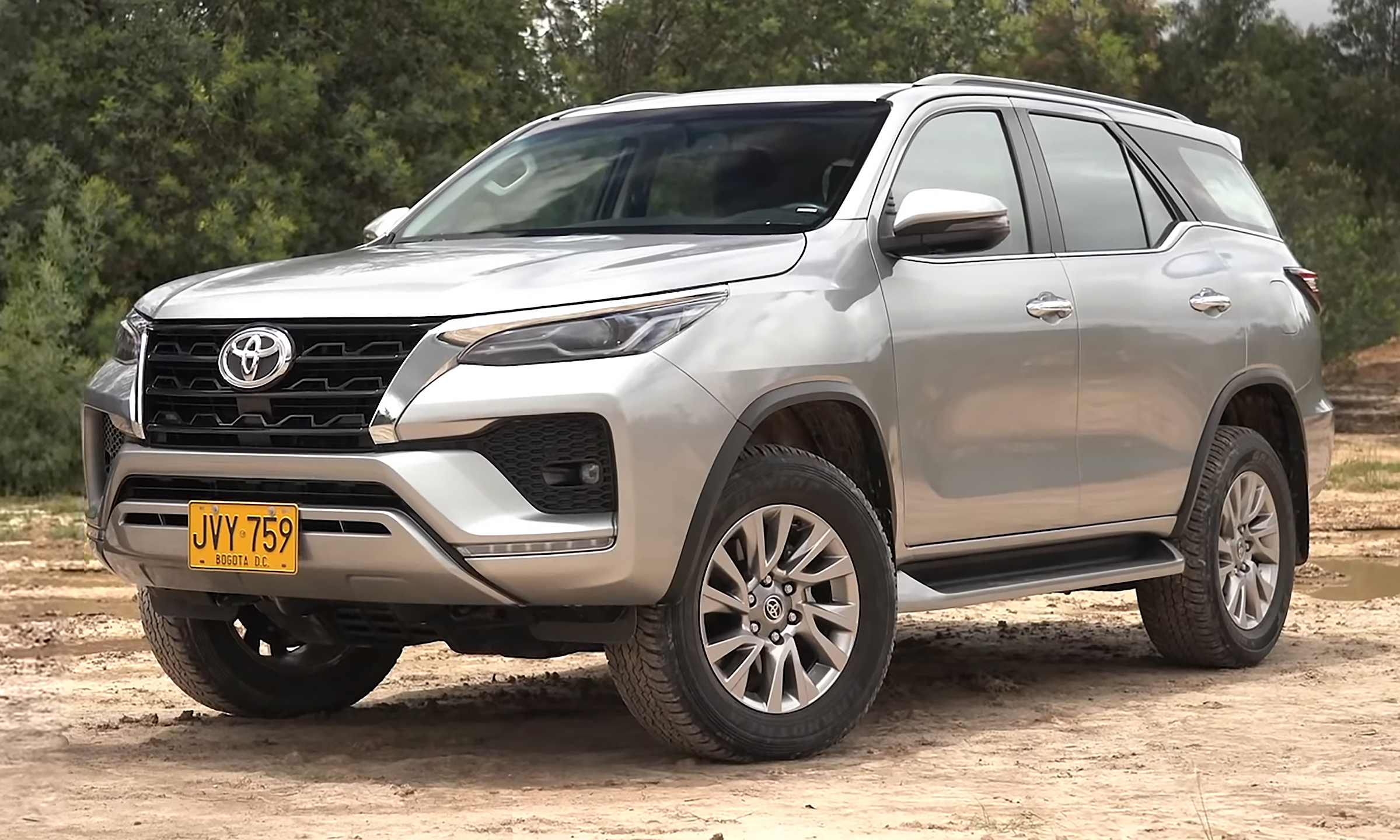
Toyota Fortuner (also called SW4), mid-size truck-based SUV

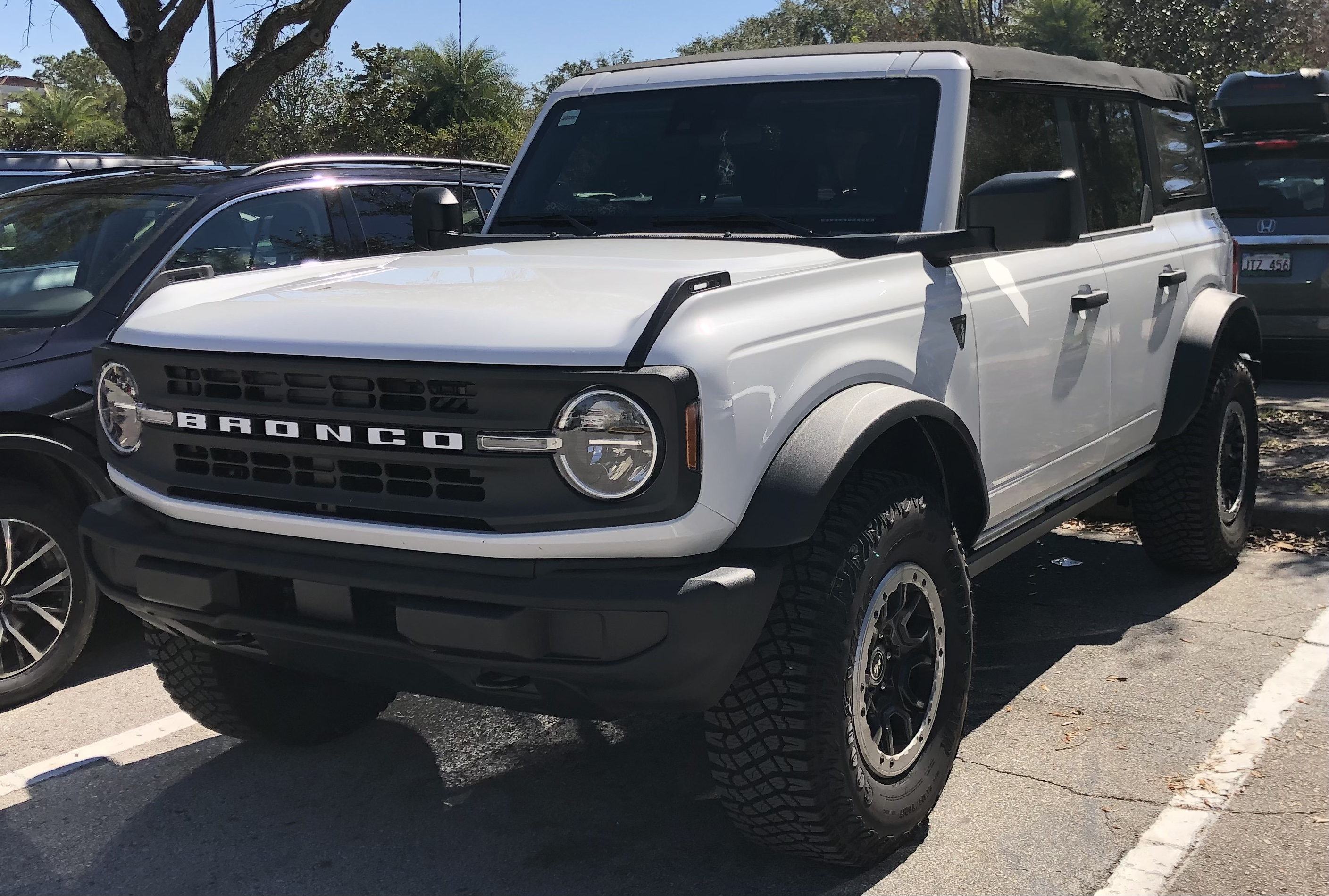
Ford Bronco, off-road mid-size SUV with a compact two-door version available

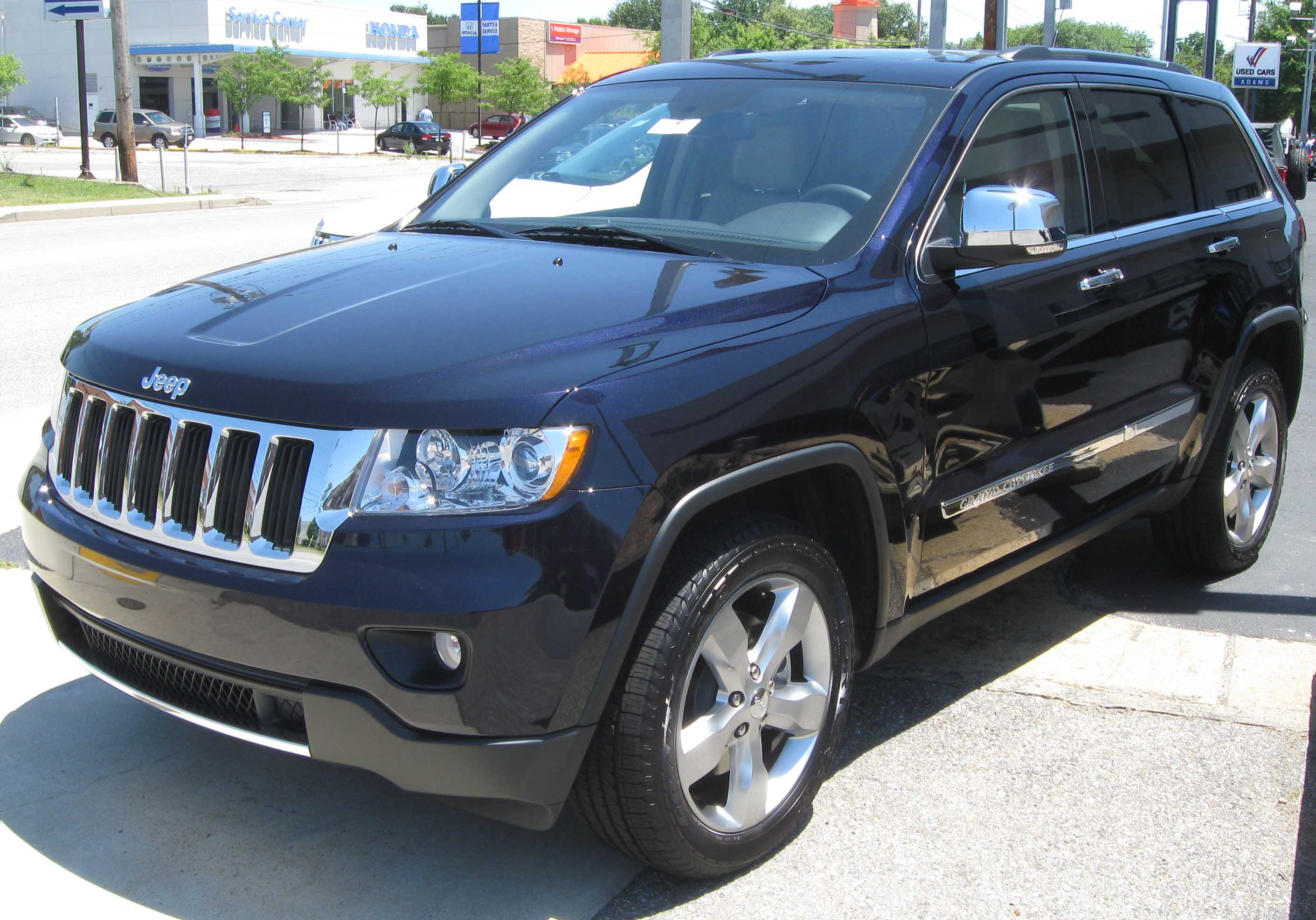
Jeep Grand Cherokee, unibody mid-size SUV

=== Full-size SUV ===
Full-size SUVs are the largest size of commonly produced SUVs. Some, such as the Ford Expedition, and Chevrolet Tahoe, are marketed for their off-road capabilities, and others, such as the Lincoln Navigator and Cadillac Escalade, are marketed as luxury vehicles. While a few full-size SUVs are built on dedicated platforms; most share their platforms with full-size pickup trucks.

Examples: Category:Full-size sport utility vehicles ( 94 )

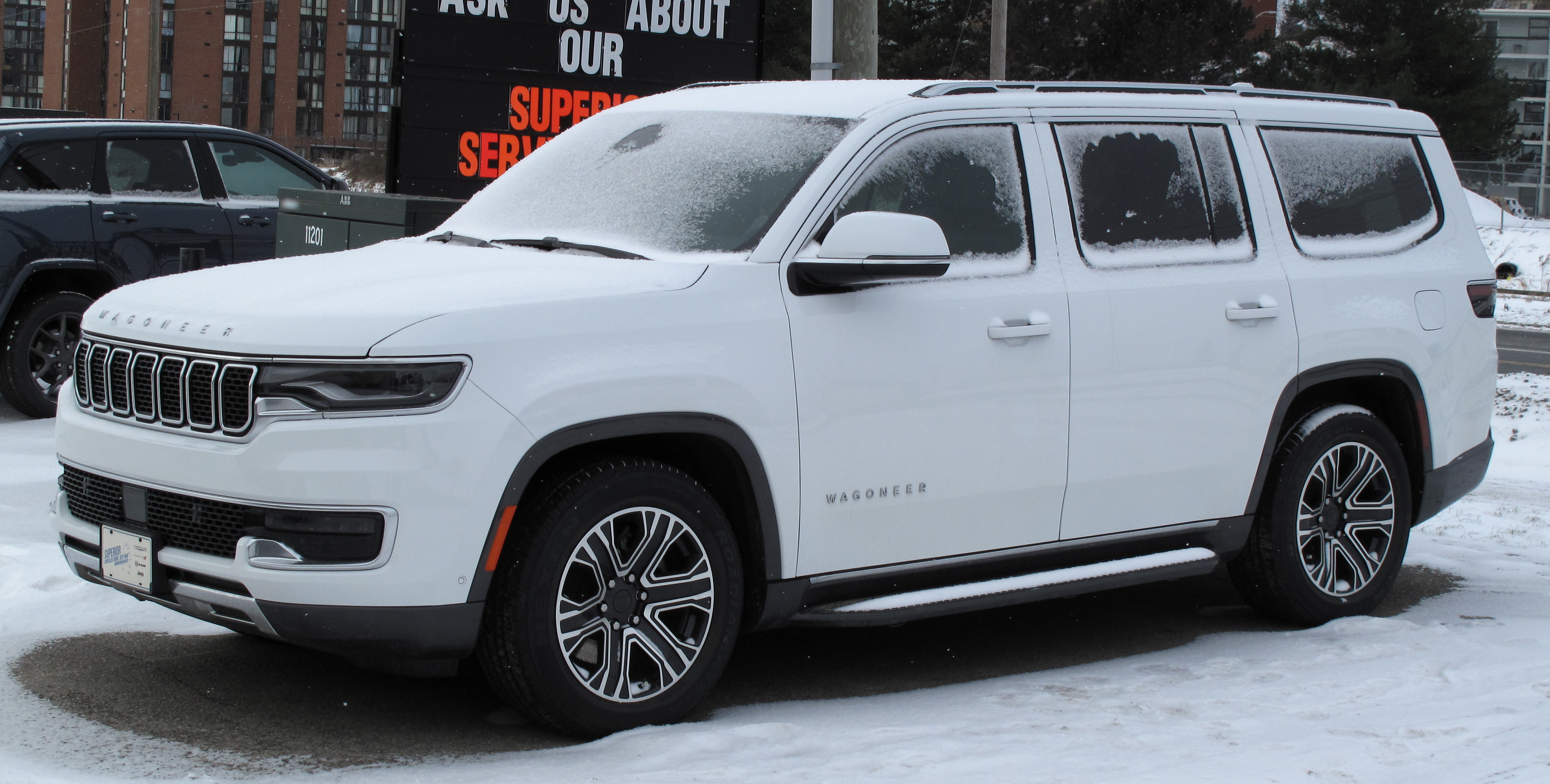
Jeep Wagoneer, full-size SUV on a pickup truck-based platform

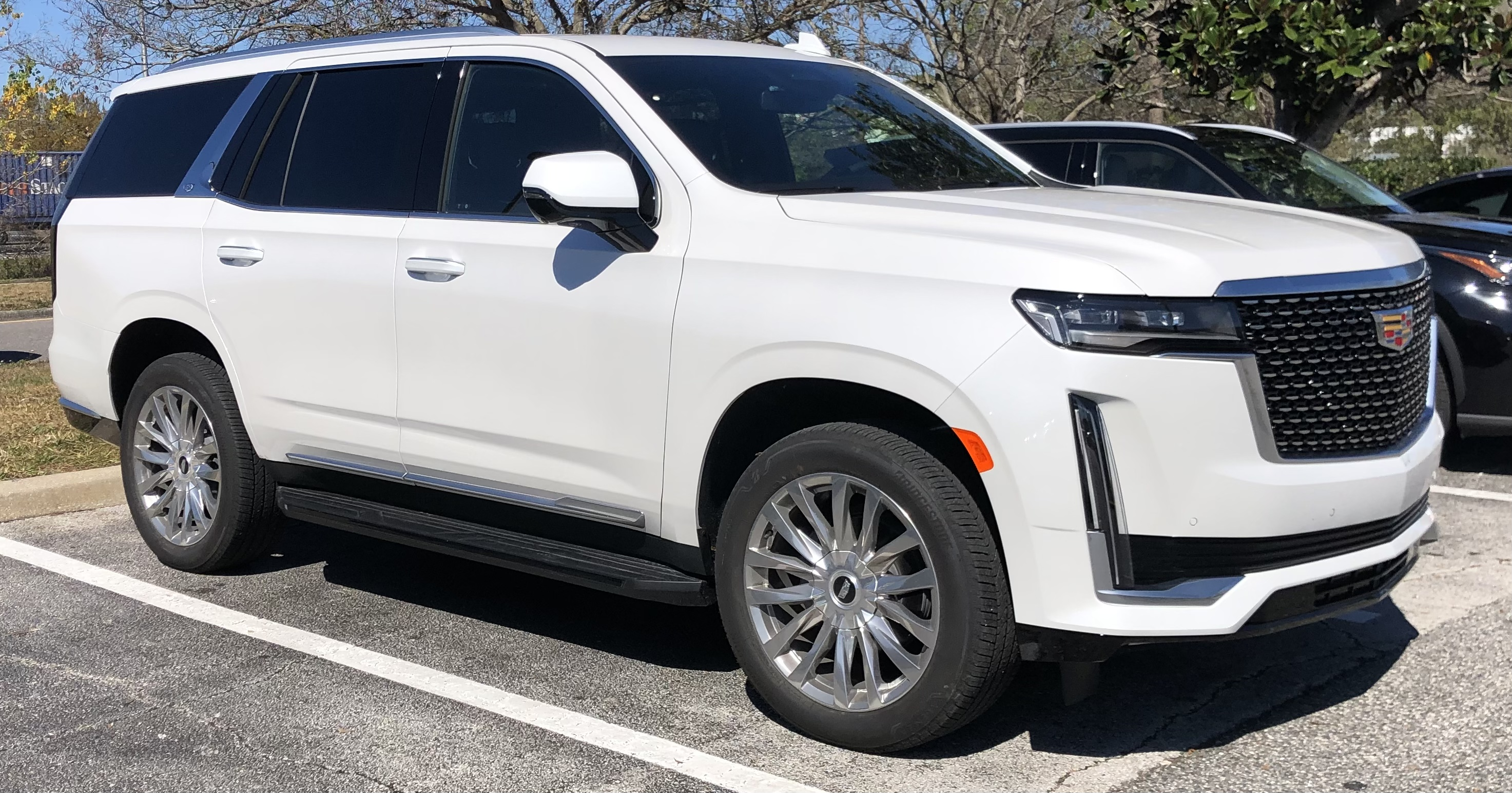
Cadillac Escalade, full-size luxury SUV

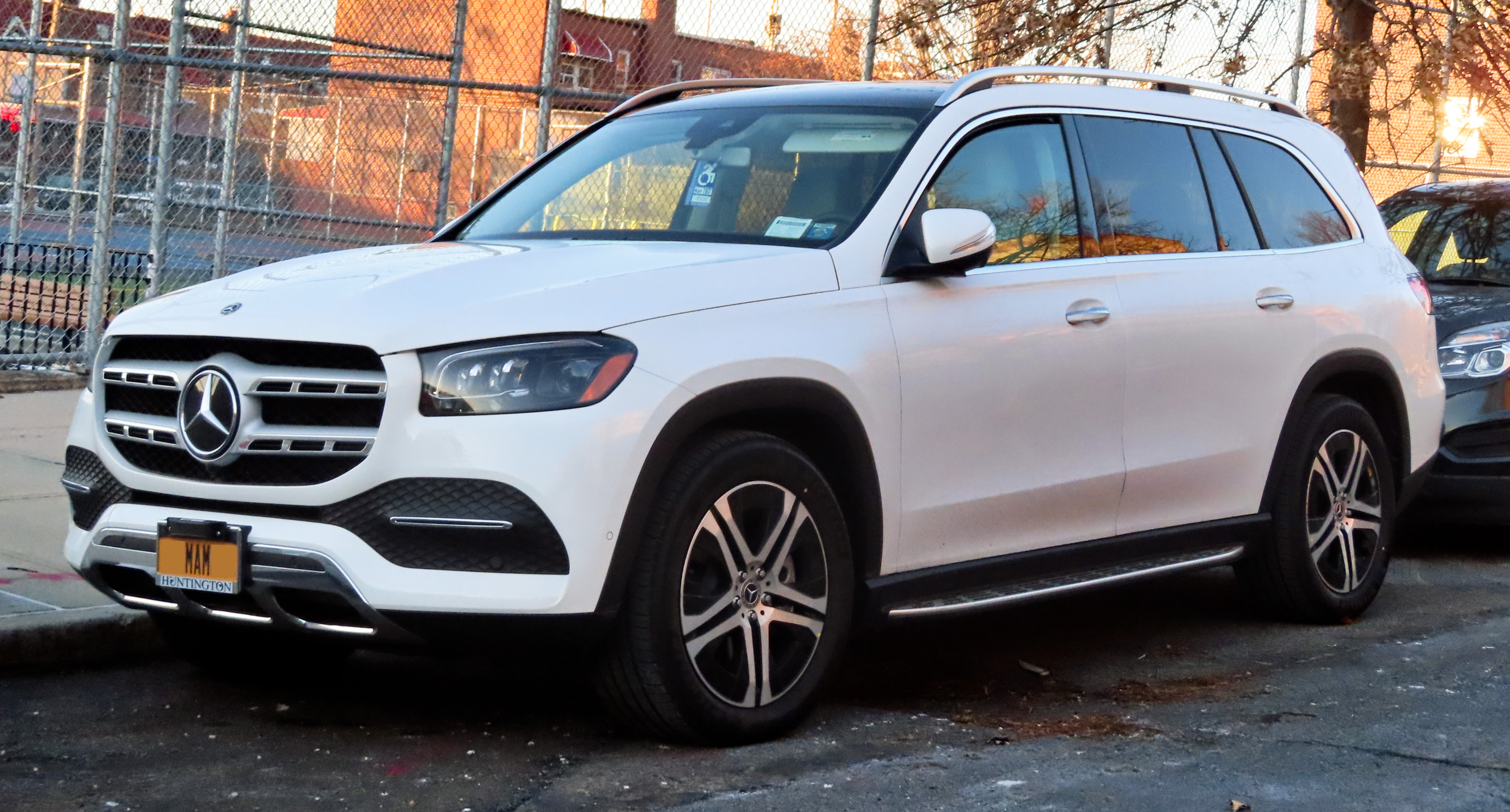
Mercedes-Benz GLS-class, full-size unibody SUV

=== Extended-length SUV ===
Some North American SUVs are available as a long-bodied version of a full-size SUV, which is called an "extended-length SUV" like the Ford Expedition EL and the Chevrolet Suburban. The additional length is used to provide extra space for rear passengers or cargo. As per the full-size SUVs they are based on, most extended-length SUVs are built on dedicated platforms, full-sized pickups (1/2 ton), or heavy-duty pickups (3/4 ton or more).

Extended-length SUVs are mostly sold in North America but may also be exported to other markets in small numbers.

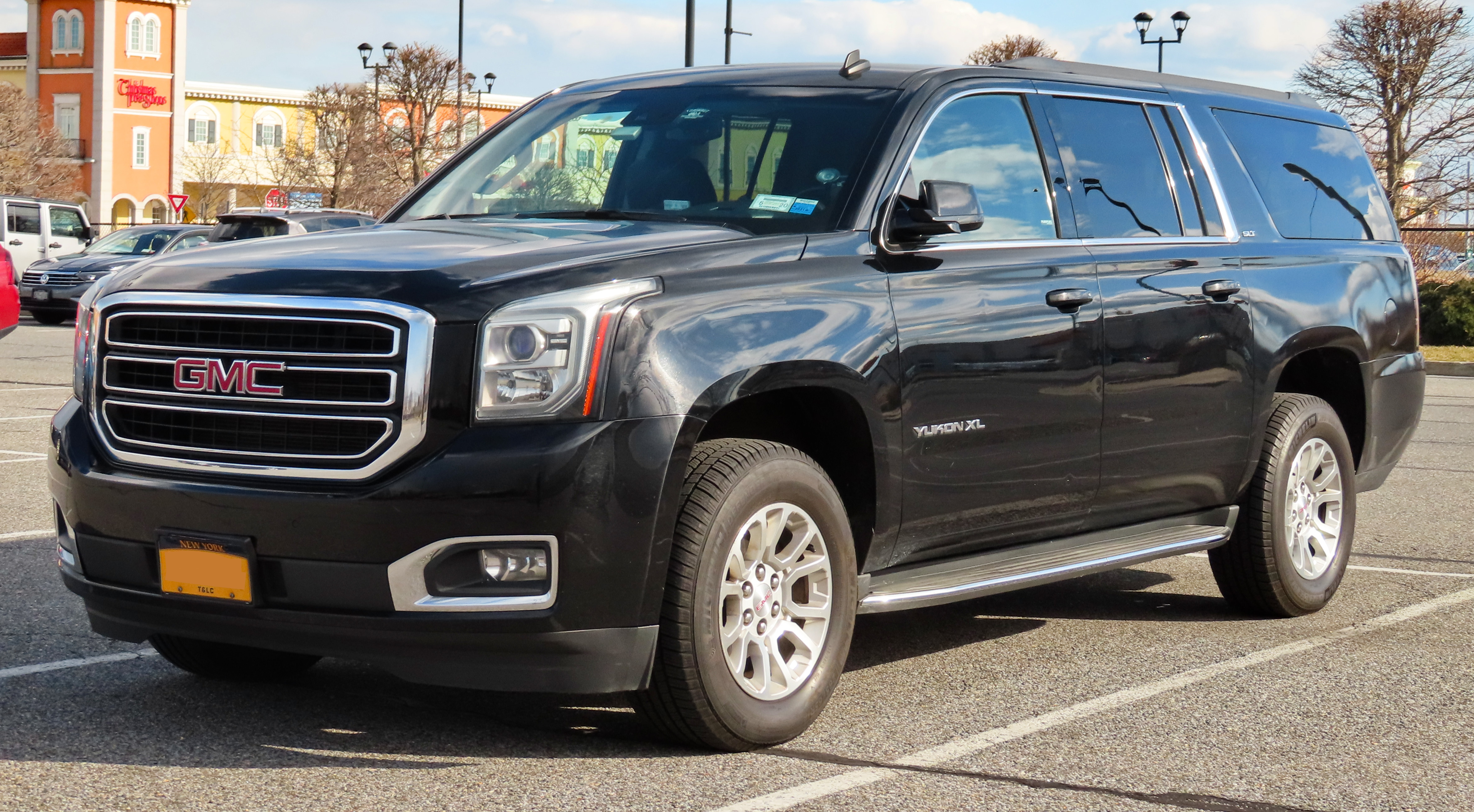
GMC Yukon XL, extended-length SUV

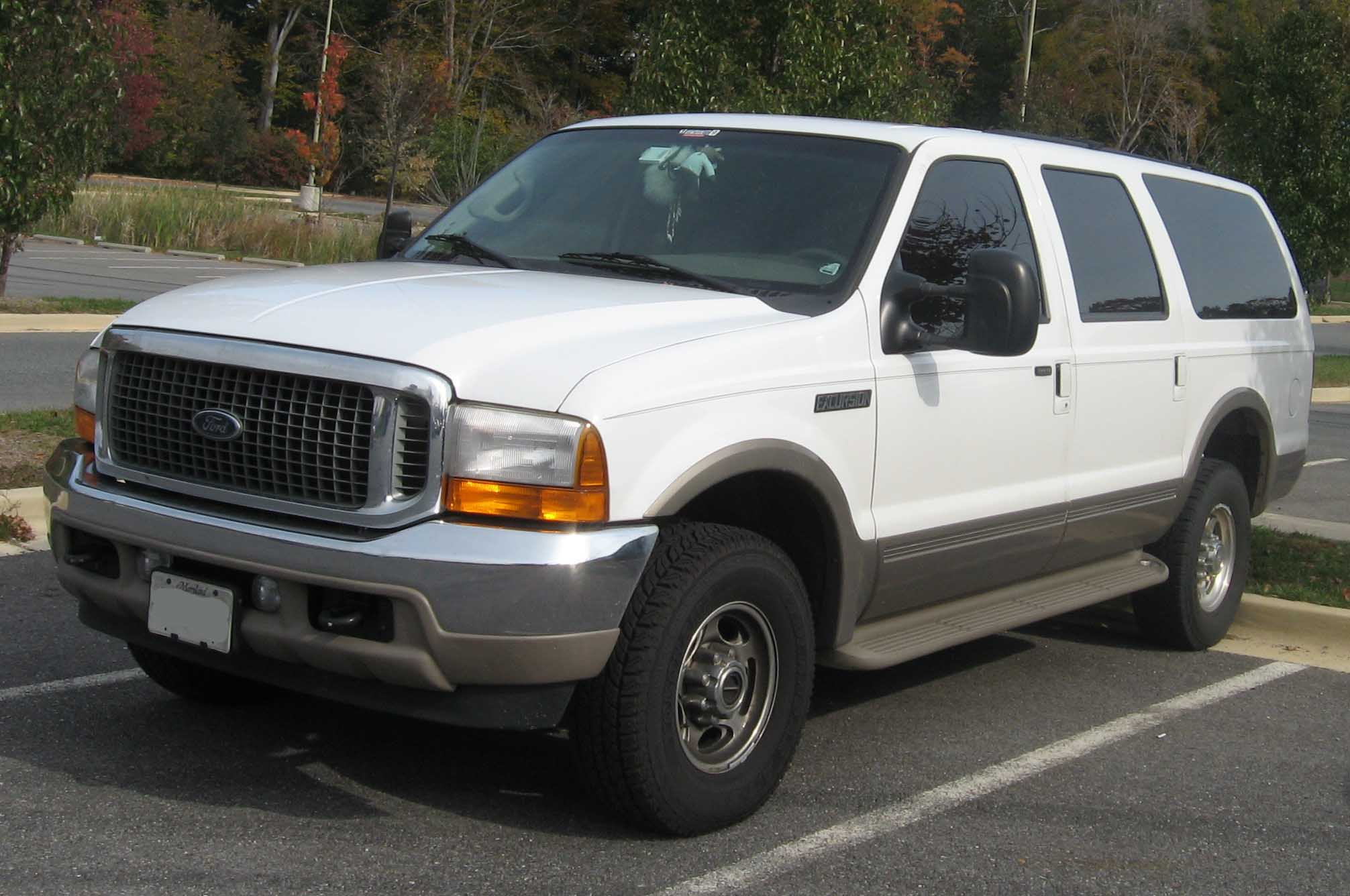
Ford Excursion, extended-length SUV based on a heavy-duty truck platform

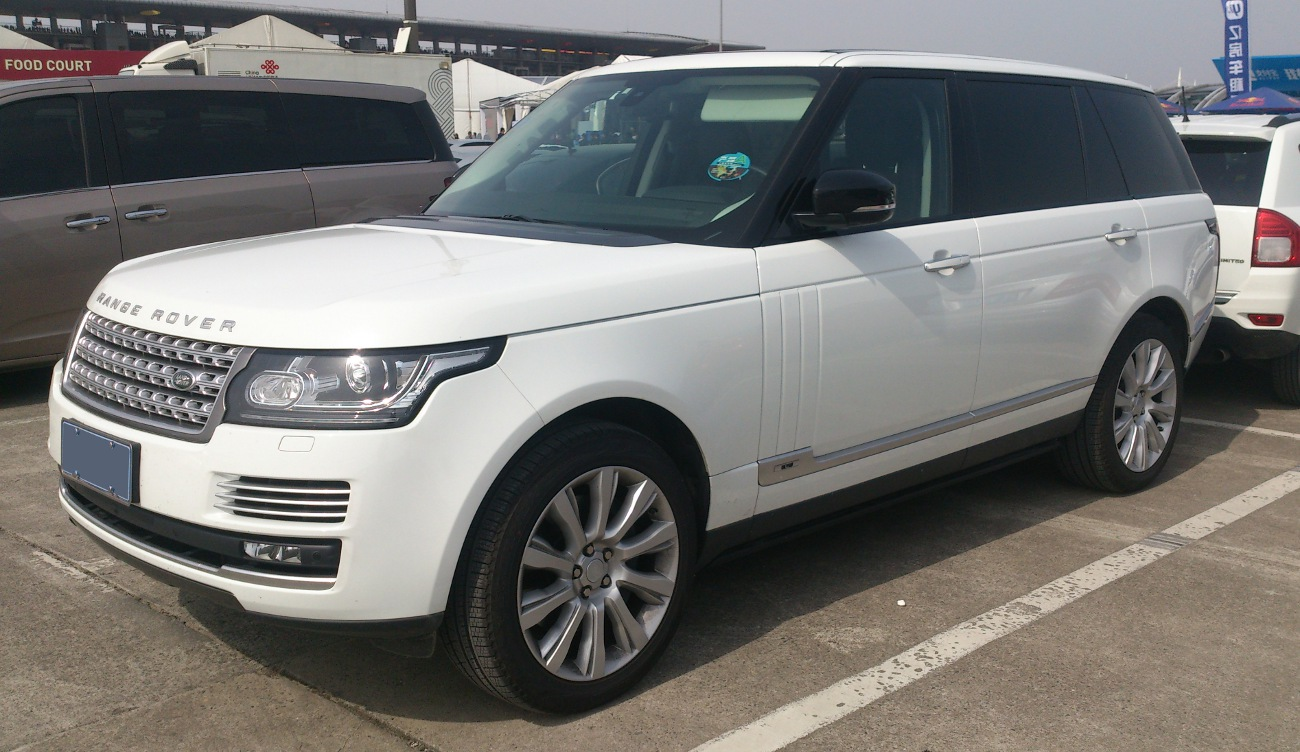
Range Rover L, extended-length unibody SUV

Examples: Category:Expanded length sport utility vehicles ( 16 )

=== Coupe SUV ===
Some SUVs or crossovers with sloping rear rooflines are marketed as "coupe crossover SUVs" or "coupe SUVs", even though they have four side doors for passenger access to the seats and rear hatches for cargo area access.

== History ==
=== 1930s to 1948 ===
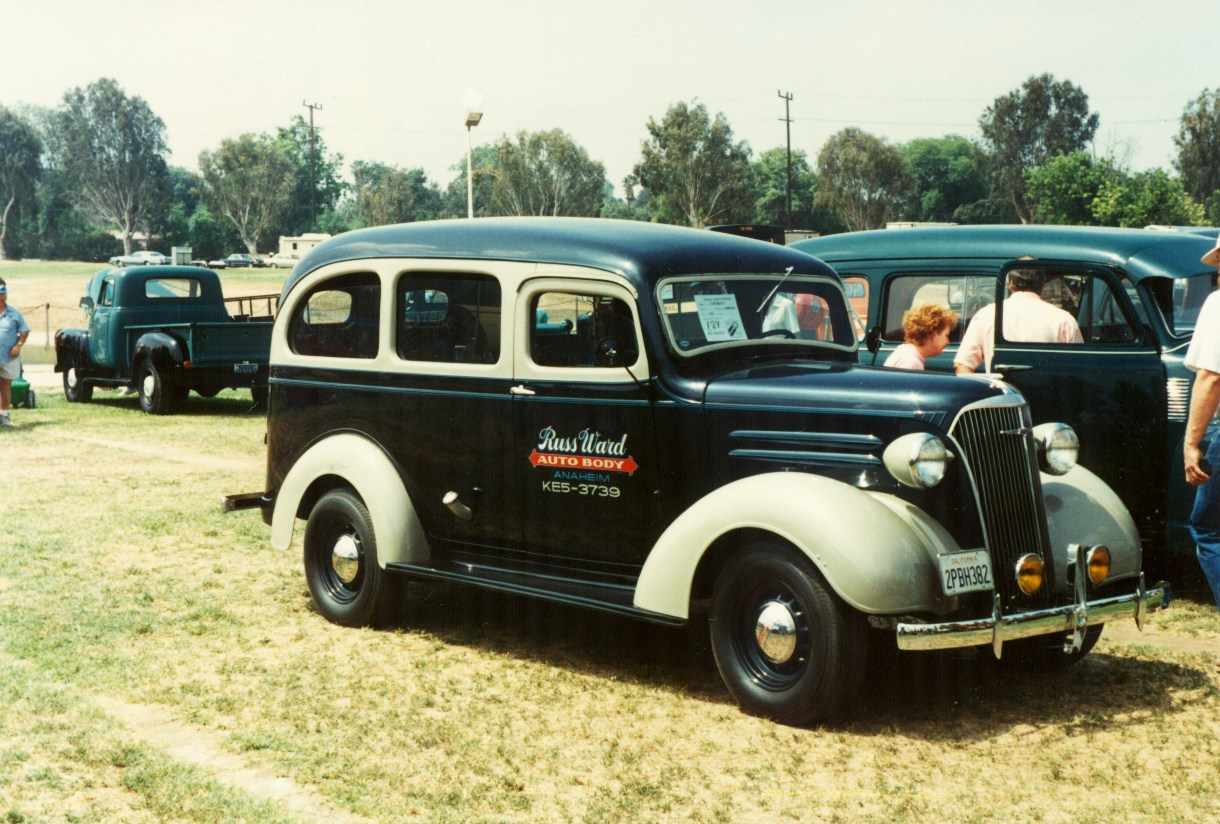
1935–1940 Chevrolet Suburban

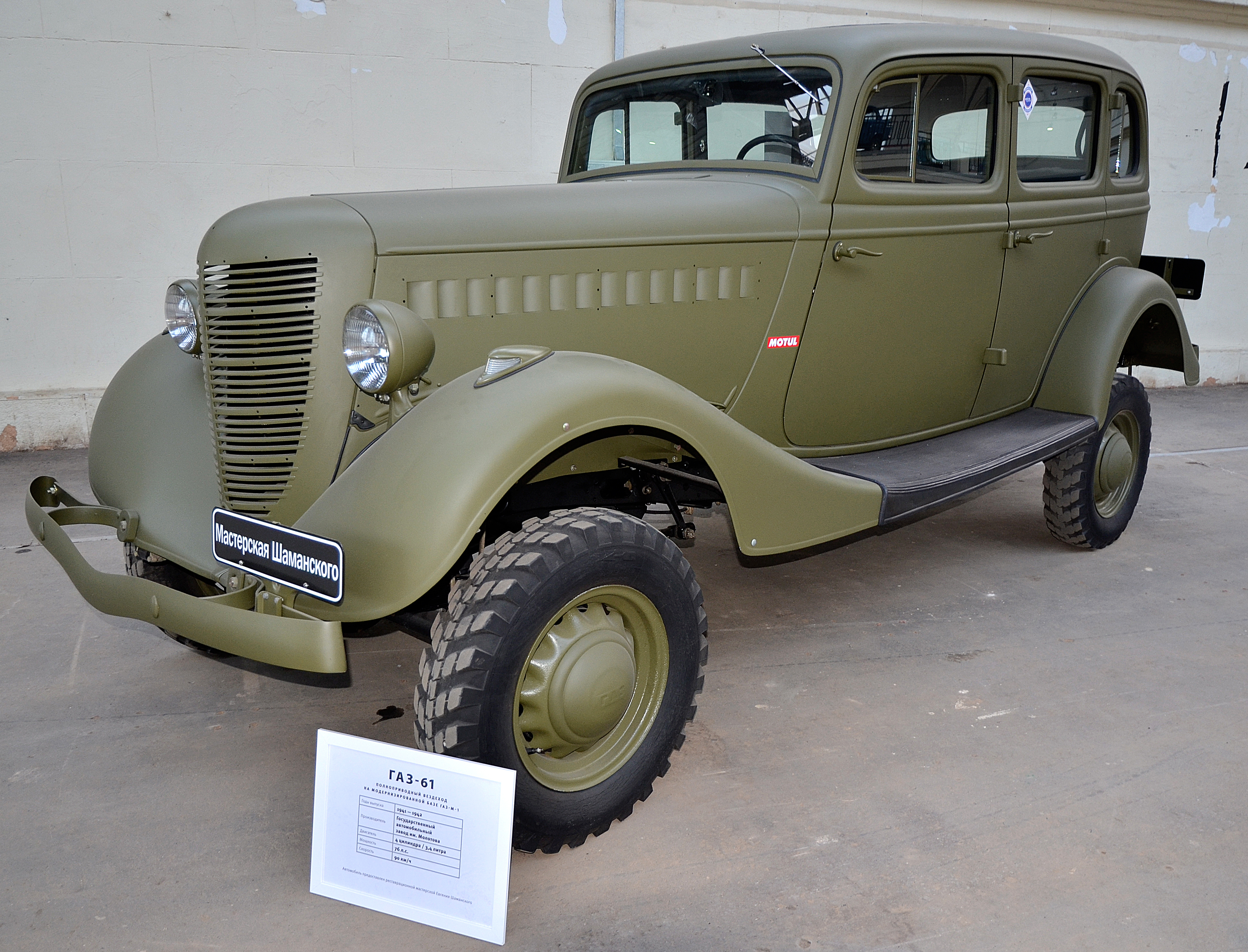
1938–1945 GAZ-61

Just before and during World War II, prototypes and low-volume production examples of military cars with sedan or station wagon-type bodies and rugged, off-road capable four-wheel drive chassis began to appear around the world. These early models included the 1936 Kurogane Type 95 from Japan, the 1938 GAZ-61 from Russia as well as the 1941 Volkswagen Kommandeurswagen and 1936 Opel Geländesportwagen from Germany. An early predecessor to the design of modern SUVs was the 1940 Humber Heavy Utility, a four-wheel-drive off-road vehicle built on the chassis of the Humber Super Snipe passenger car.

The most prohibitive initial factors to the potential civilian popularity of an SUV-like car were their cost and the availability of certain critical parts. Before the war, adding four-wheel drive to a car almost doubled its cost. Compared to a common, rear-wheel drive vehicle, any 4WD (four-wheel drive) needed many essential extra components, including a transfer case, a second differential, and constant-velocity joints for the driven front axle—which were expensive due to the precision involved in this required manufacturing gears and other specialized parts. Before World War II, these were produced in the United States by only a few specialized firms with limited production capacity. Due to the increase in demand for parts for the war effort, in early 1942 Ford, Dodge, and Chevrolet joined in fabricating these parts in mass quantities, boosting their production more than 100-fold.

An early usage of the term was the 1947 Crosley CC Four Sport Utility model, which used a convertible wagon body style and is therefore unrelated to the design of later SUVs.

=== 1949 to 1970s ===
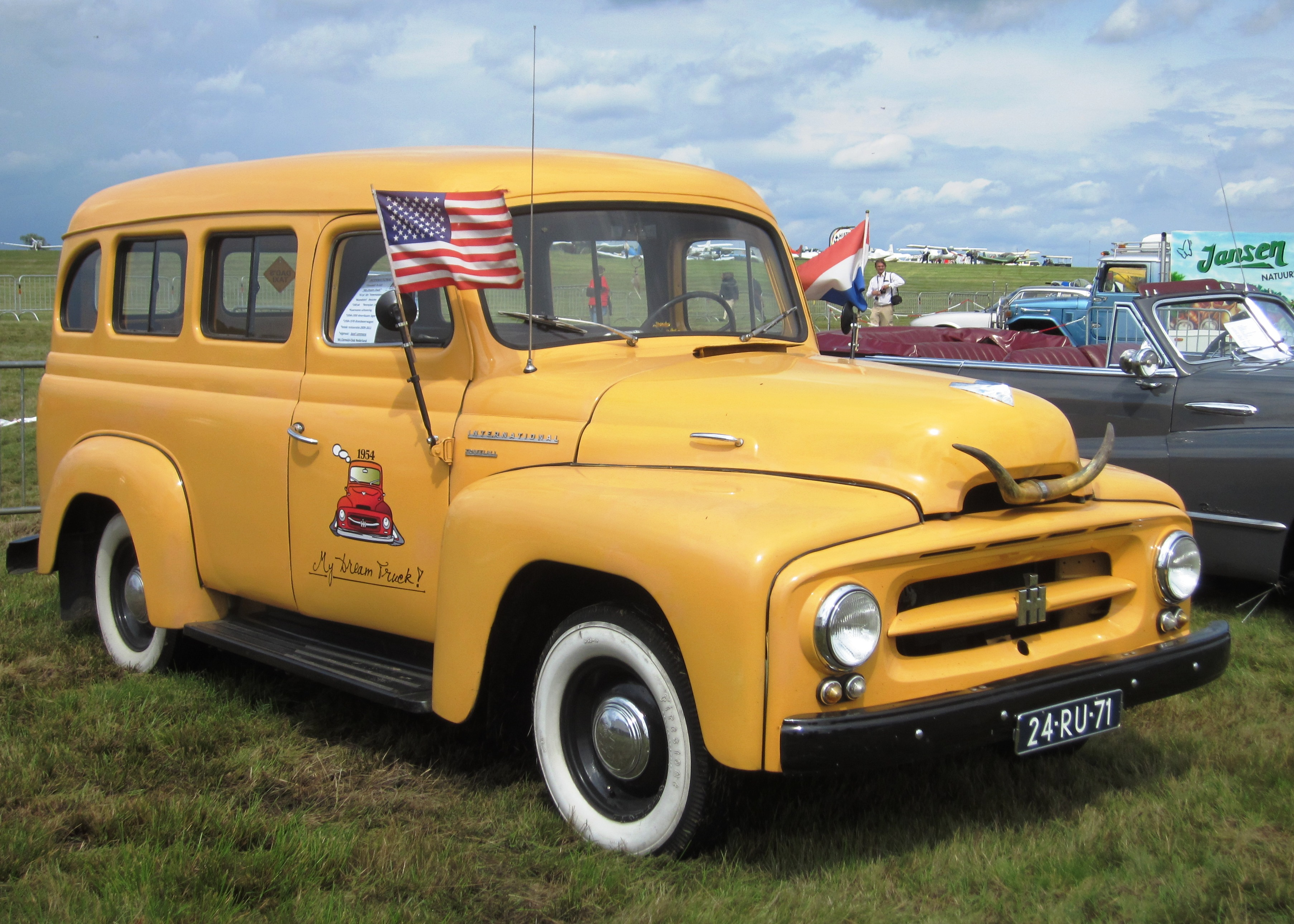
1953 International Harvester Travelall

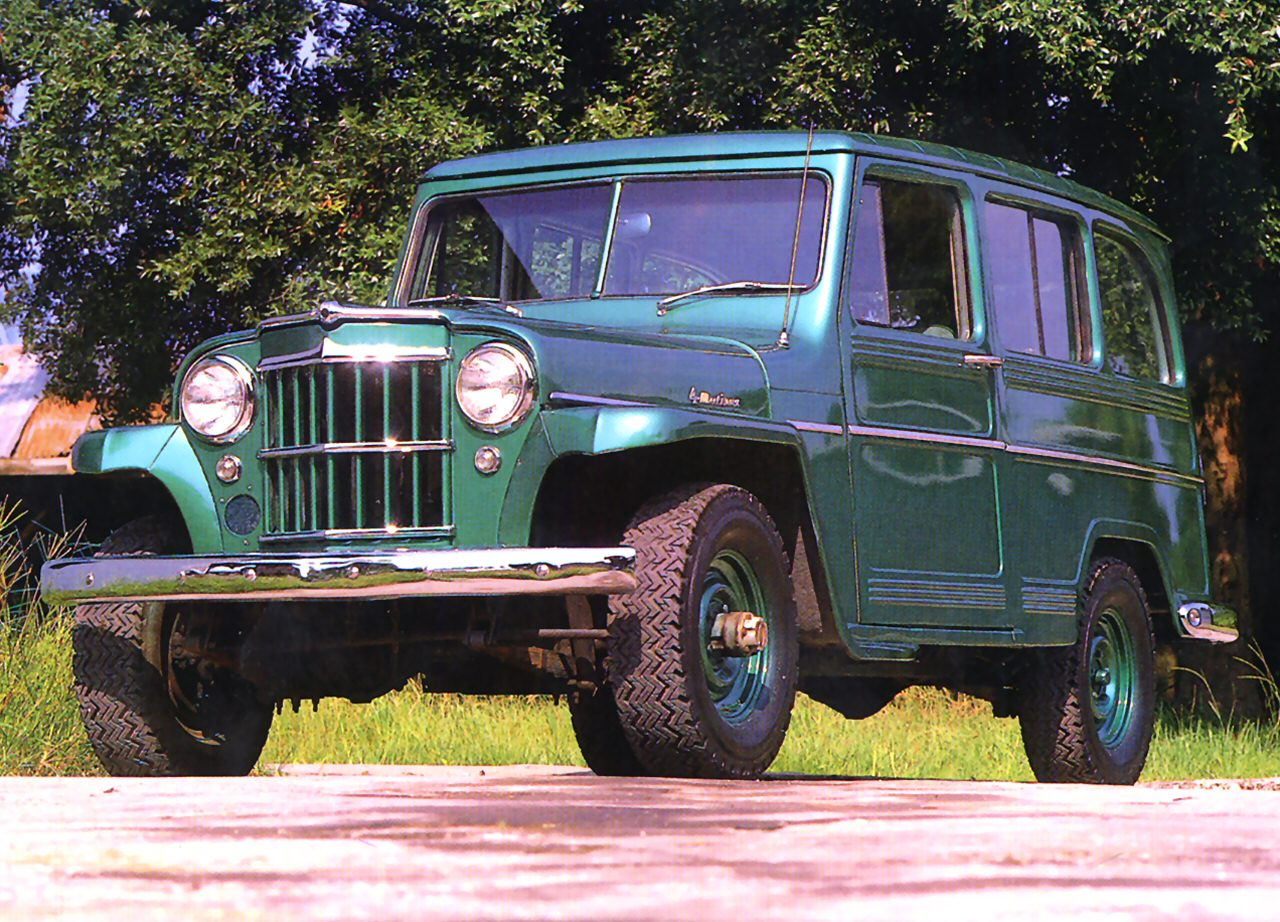
1962 Willys Jeep Station Wagon

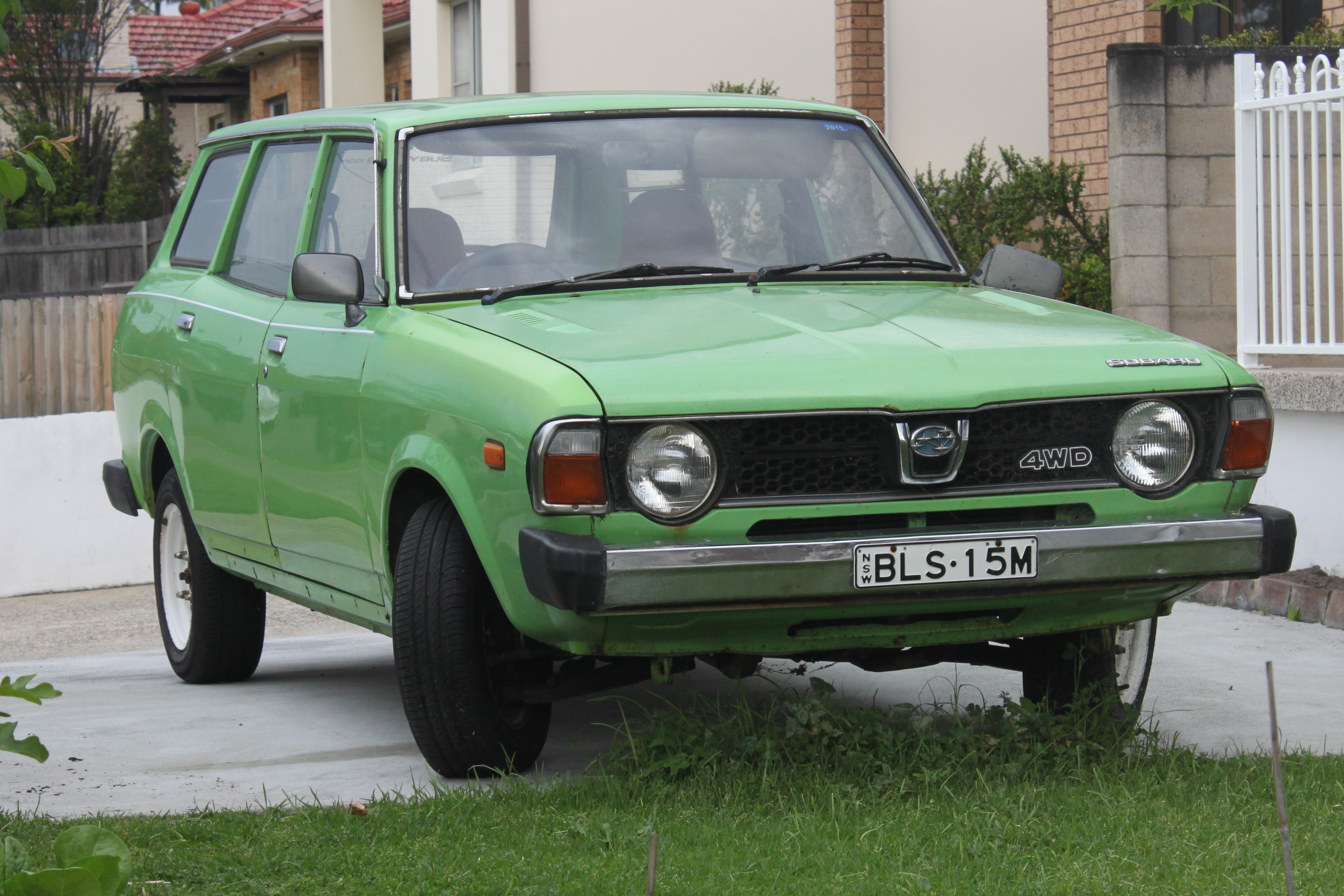
Subaru Leone 4WD station wagon

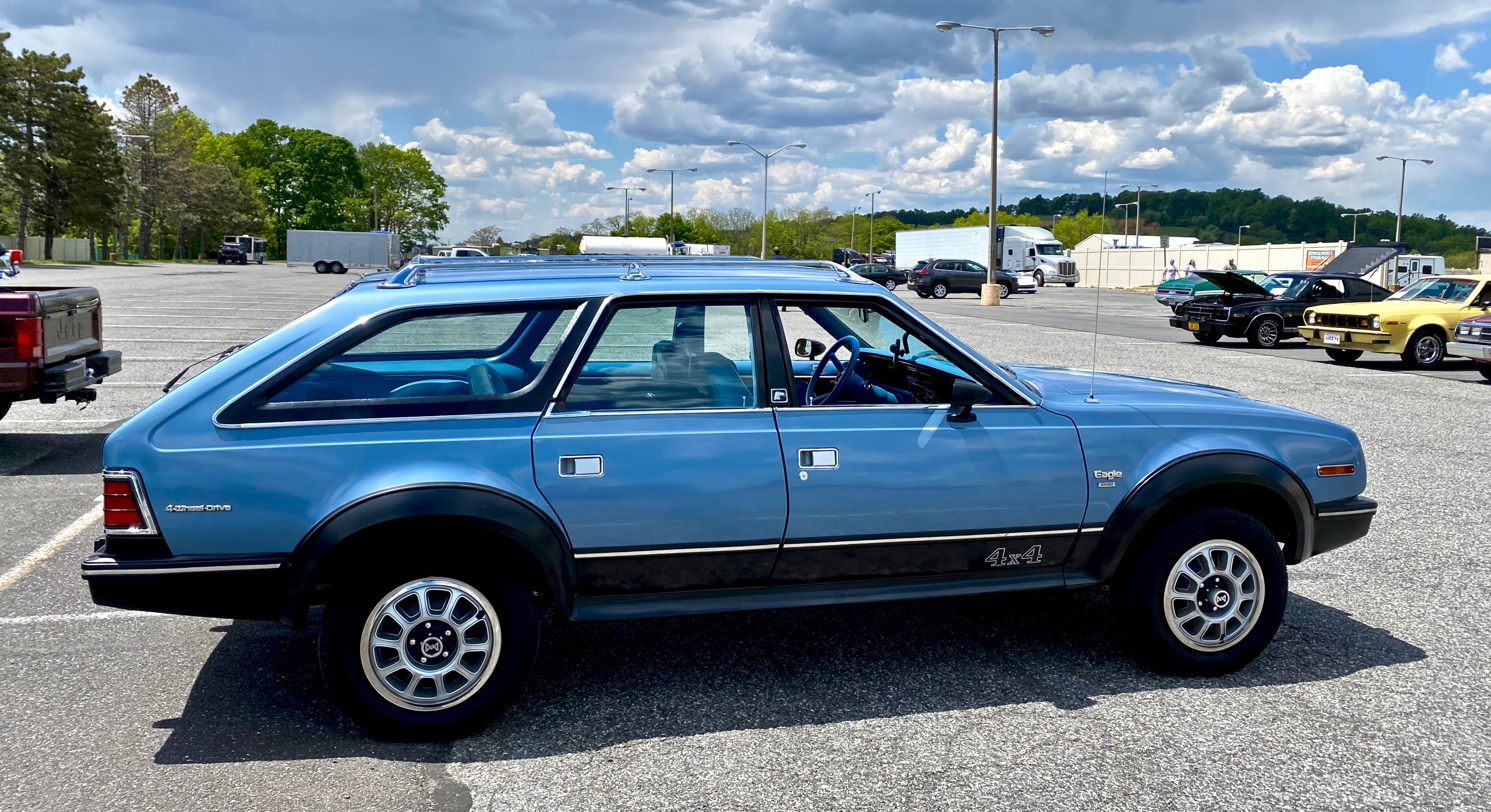
AMC Eagle Sport station wagon

Several models of carryall wagons began to be offered with four-wheel drive, beginning in 1949 when the Willys Jeep Station Wagon introduced the option of four-wheel drive. Four-wheel-drive versions of the Chevrolet Suburban were introduced for 1955, followed by the International Harvester Travelall in 1956 (credited as being the first full-size SUV) and the Power Wagon Town Wagon in 1957.

Developed as a competitor to the Jeep CJ, the compact International Scout was introduced in 1961, offering either two- or four-wheel drive and a variety of engine options. The Harvester Scout provided many other options designed to appeal to a wide range of customers for numerous uses as well. The 1963 Jeep Wagoneer (SJ) introduced a sophisticated station wagon body design that was more carlike than any other four-wheel-drive vehicle on the market. The 1967 Toyota Land Cruiser FJ55 station wagon was the first comfort-oriented version of the Land Cruiser off-road vehicle. The two-door Chevrolet K5 Blazer (and related GMC K5 Jimmy) were introduced for 1969, and the two-door International Scout II was introduced in 1971. The first European luxury off-road vehicle was the 1970 Range Rover Classic, which was marketed as a luxury car for both on-road and off-road usage.

In 1972 Subaru Leone 4WD wagon was introduced in Japan, which was not designed as an off-road vehicle, but a version of the front-wheel-drive passenger car. Some argue that this was the first SUV. It was also classified as a commercial vehicle in the home market, just like later SUVs.

The first relevant usage of the term SUV was in advertising brochures for the full-sized 1974 Jeep Cherokee (SJ), which used the wording "sport(s) utility vehicle" as a description for the vehicle. The 1966 Ford Bronco included a "sport utility" model; however, in this case it was used for the two-door pickup truck version.

The VAZ-2121 (now designated Lada Niva Legend) was the first mass-market 4WD unibody car in some markets in 1977. The AMC Eagle introduced in the North American market in 1979, and is often called the first mass-market "crossover", although that term had not been coined at the time. In contrast to truck or utility-vehicle based designs and the Niva that was purpose-built for rural areas, American Motors Corporation (AMC) utilized a long-serving existing car platform and designed a new automatic full-time AWD system. It was first with "SUV styling on a raised passenger-car platform combined with AWD." Four Wheeler magazine described the AMC Eagle as "the beginning of a new generation of cars".

=== 1980s to 1990s ===
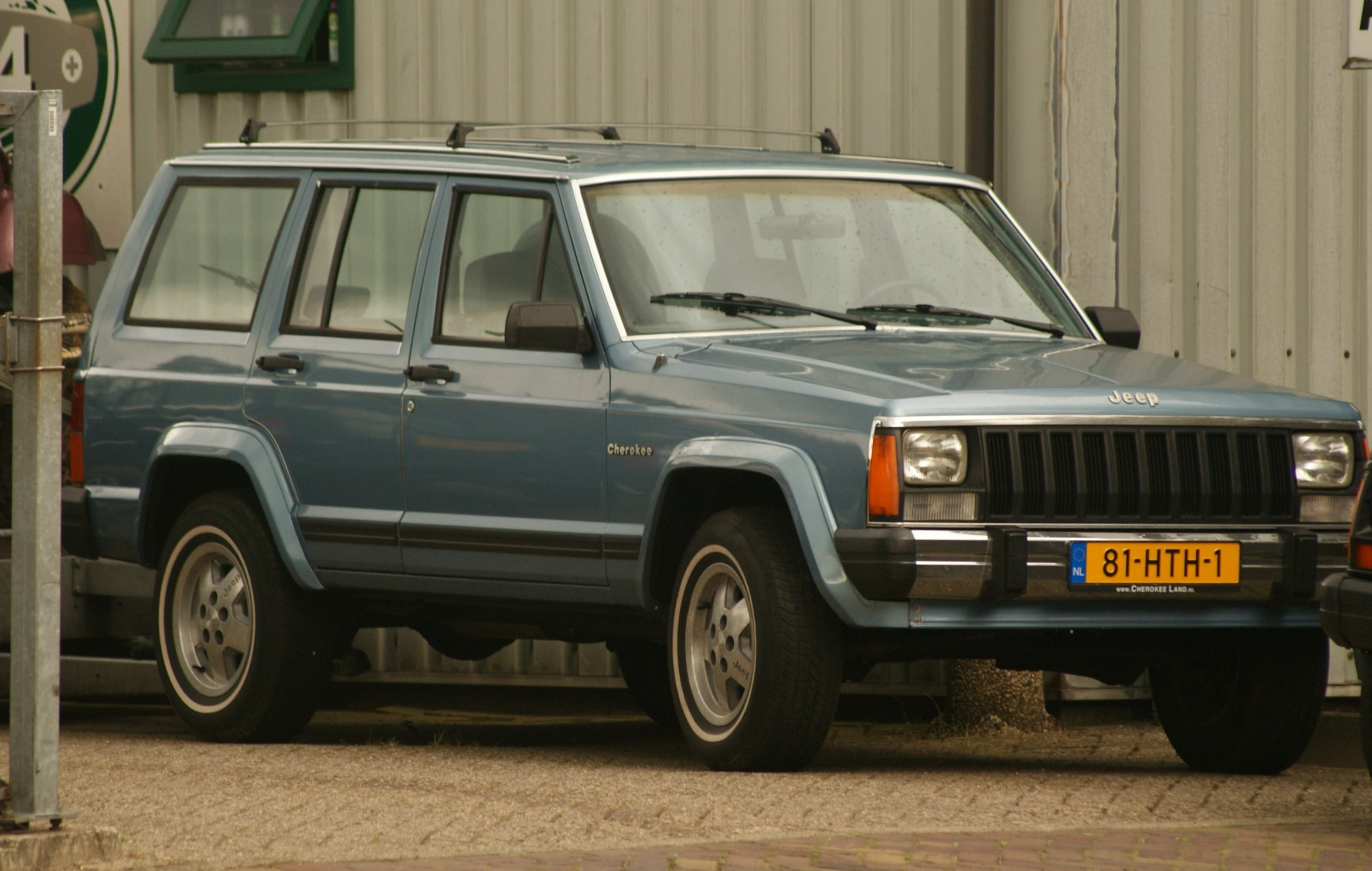
1985 Jeep Cherokee (XJ)

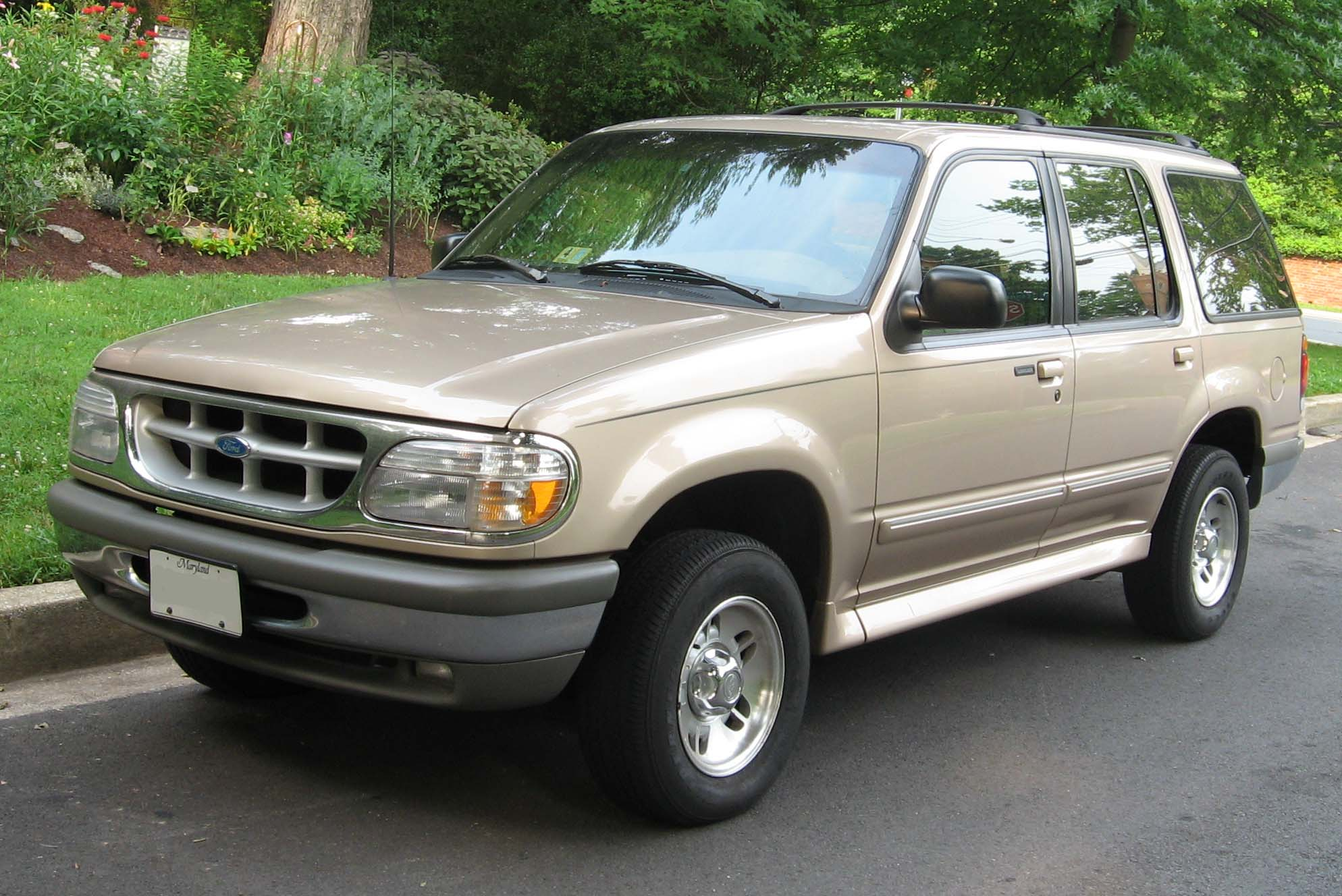
1994–2001 Ford Explorer

The compact-sized 1984 Jeep Cherokee (XJ) is often credited as the first SUV in the modern understanding of the term. The use of unibody construction was unique at the time for a four-wheel drive and also reduced the weight of the new Cherokee. It also appealed to urban families due to having a more compact size (compared to the full-size Wagoneer and previous generation Cherokee SJ models) as well as a plush interior resembling a station wagon. As the new Cherokee became a major sales success, the term "sport utility vehicle" began to be used in the national press for the first time. "The advent and immediate success of AMC/Jeep's compact four-door Cherokee turned the truck industry upside down."

The U.S. corporate average fuel economy (CAFE) standard was introduced in 1975 to reduce fuel usage, but included relaxed regulations for "light trucks" to avoid businesses paying extra taxes for work vehicles. This created a loophole that manufacturers increasingly exploited following the 1980s oil glut (which started an era of cheap gasoline), whereby SUVs were designed to be classified as light trucks despite their primary use as passenger vehicles to receive tax concessions and less stringent fuel economy requirements. This enabled manufacturers to sell more profitable, larger, more polluting vehicles, instead of the smaller, less polluting, less profitable cars that the CAFE regulations intended.

For example, the United States Environmental Protection Agency agreed to classify the new Jeep Cherokee as a light truck following lobbying from its manufacturer; the Cherokee was then marketed by the company as a passenger vehicle. This increased the SUV boom as other manufacturers introduced their own SUVs in response to the compact Cherokee taking sales from their regular cars.

In 1994 the U.S. Environmental Protection Agency began classifying vehicles by "market class". For SUVs in 1994 they included three Jeep models, the Cherokee, Grand Cherokee and Wrangler. Two Ford models were the Bronco and the Explorer. Six General Motors models including the GMC Jimmy, the Yukon, and the Suburban 1500; the Chevrolet Suburban 1500, and the Blazer (1500 and S10); the Geo Tracker (Convertible or Van); and finally the Oldsmobile Bravada. Eleven Japanese models classified as SUVs were the Toyota 4Runner and Land Cruiser; the Honda Passport; the Nissan Pathfinder; the Mazda Navajo; the Mitsubishi Montero; the Isuzu Amigo, Rodeo, and Trooper; and the Suzuki Samurai and Sidekick. From Europe the three Land Rover models, the Range Rover, the Defender and the Discovery were classified as SUVs.

By late 1996 Consumers Digest magazine was calling the trend an "SUV craze", and by 1999 the U.S. sales of SUVs and light trucks for the first time exceeded sales of regular passenger cars.

=== 2000s ===
By 2003, there were 76 million SUVs and light trucks on U.S. roads, representing approximately 35% of the vehicles on the road.

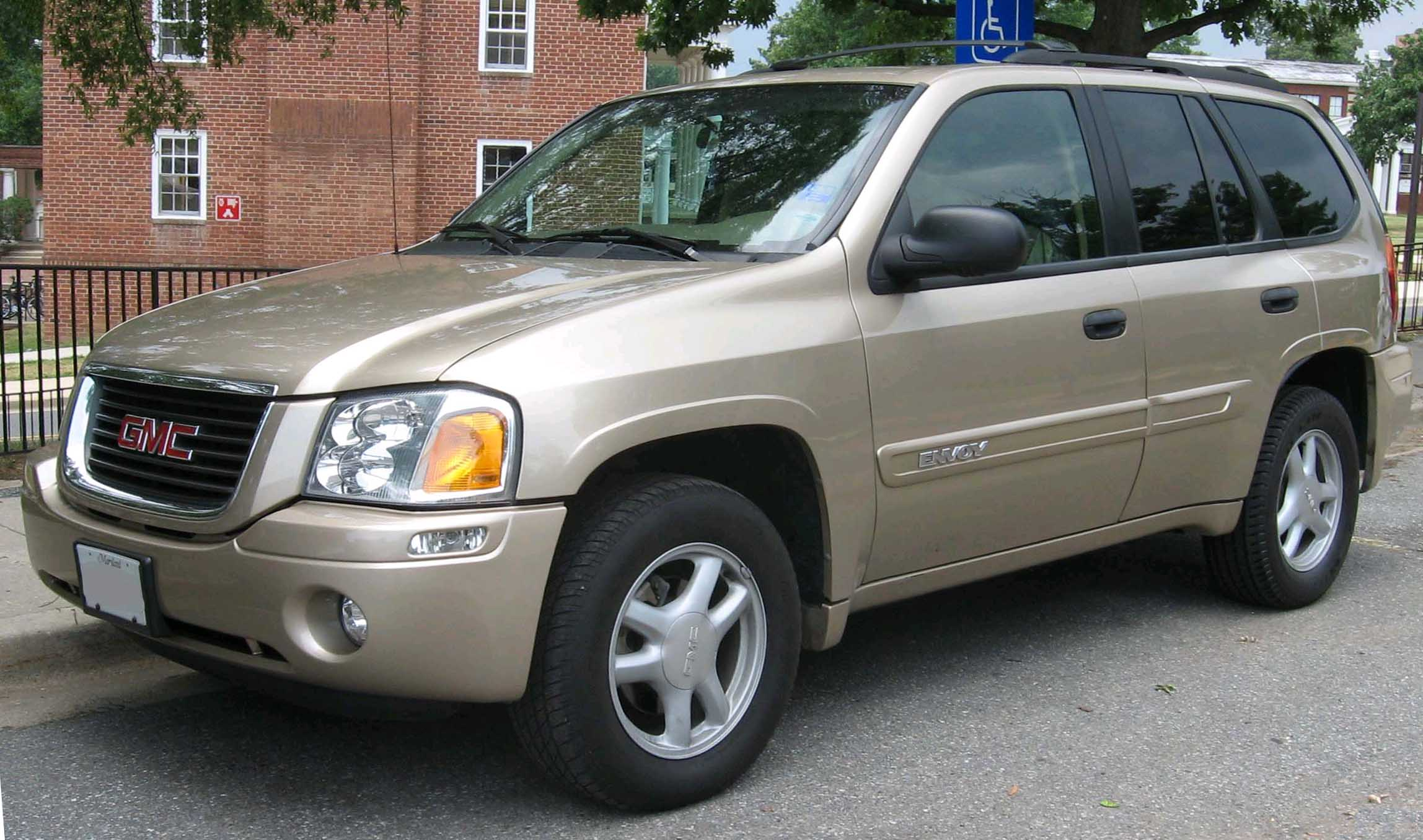
GMC Envoy

Car manufacturers were keen to promote SUV sales over other types of cars due to higher profits in the segment. An SUV could be sold with a profit margin of US$10,000 or more (US$18,000 per SUV in the case of the Ford Excursion), while compact cars were often sold at a loss of a few hundred dollars per car. As a result, several manufacturing plants were converted from car production to SUV production (such as the General Motors plant in Arlington, Texas in 1996), and many long-running U.S. sedan models were discontinued.

From the mid-2000s until 2010, U.S. sales of SUVs and other light trucks experienced a dip due to increasing fuel prices and then a declining economy. From 2008 until 2010, General Motors closed four assembly plants that were producing SUVs and trucks. Sales of SUVs and light trucks sales began to recover in 2010, as fuel prices decreased and the North American economy improved.

=== 2010s to 2020s ===
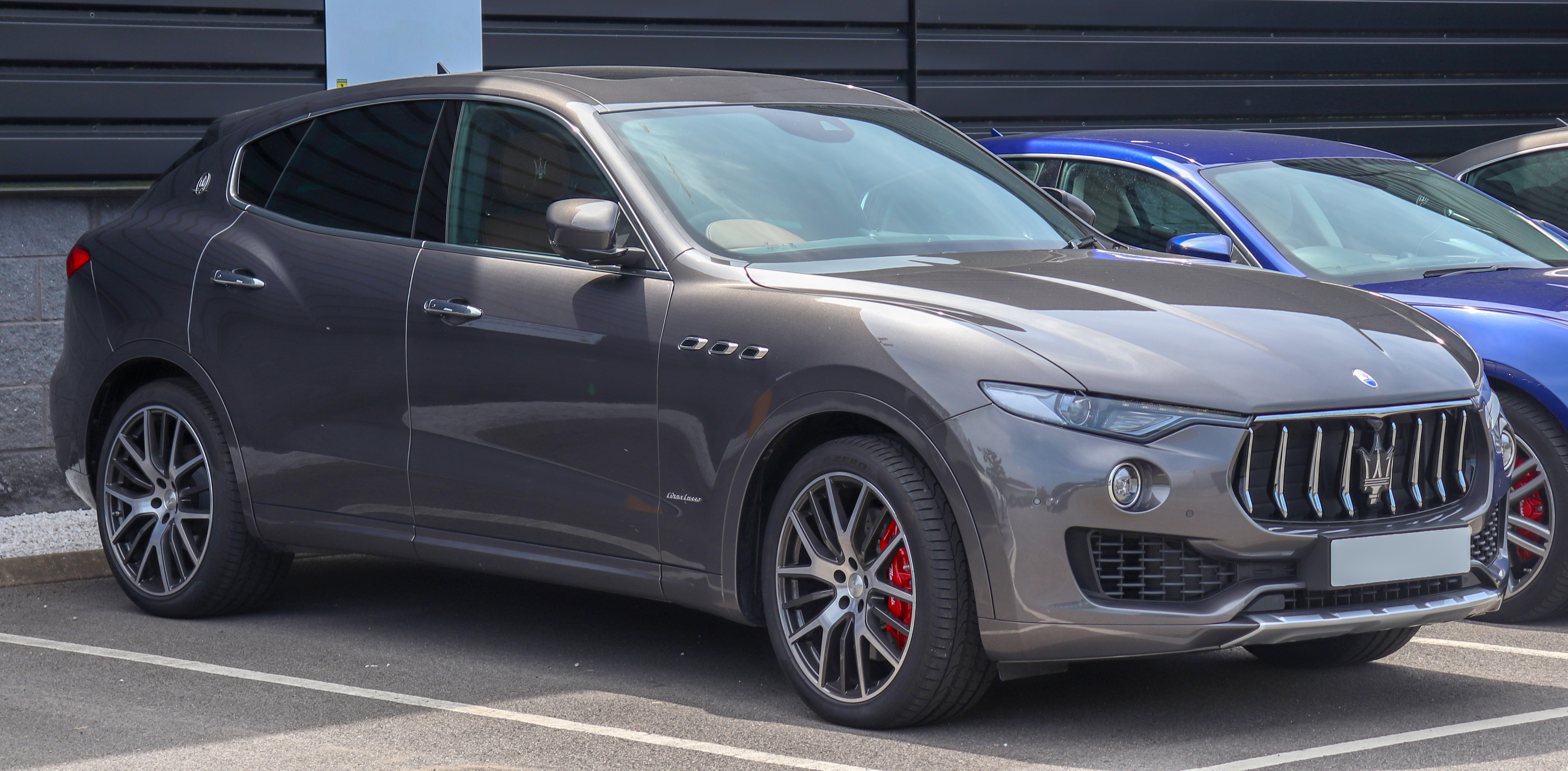
Maserati Levante

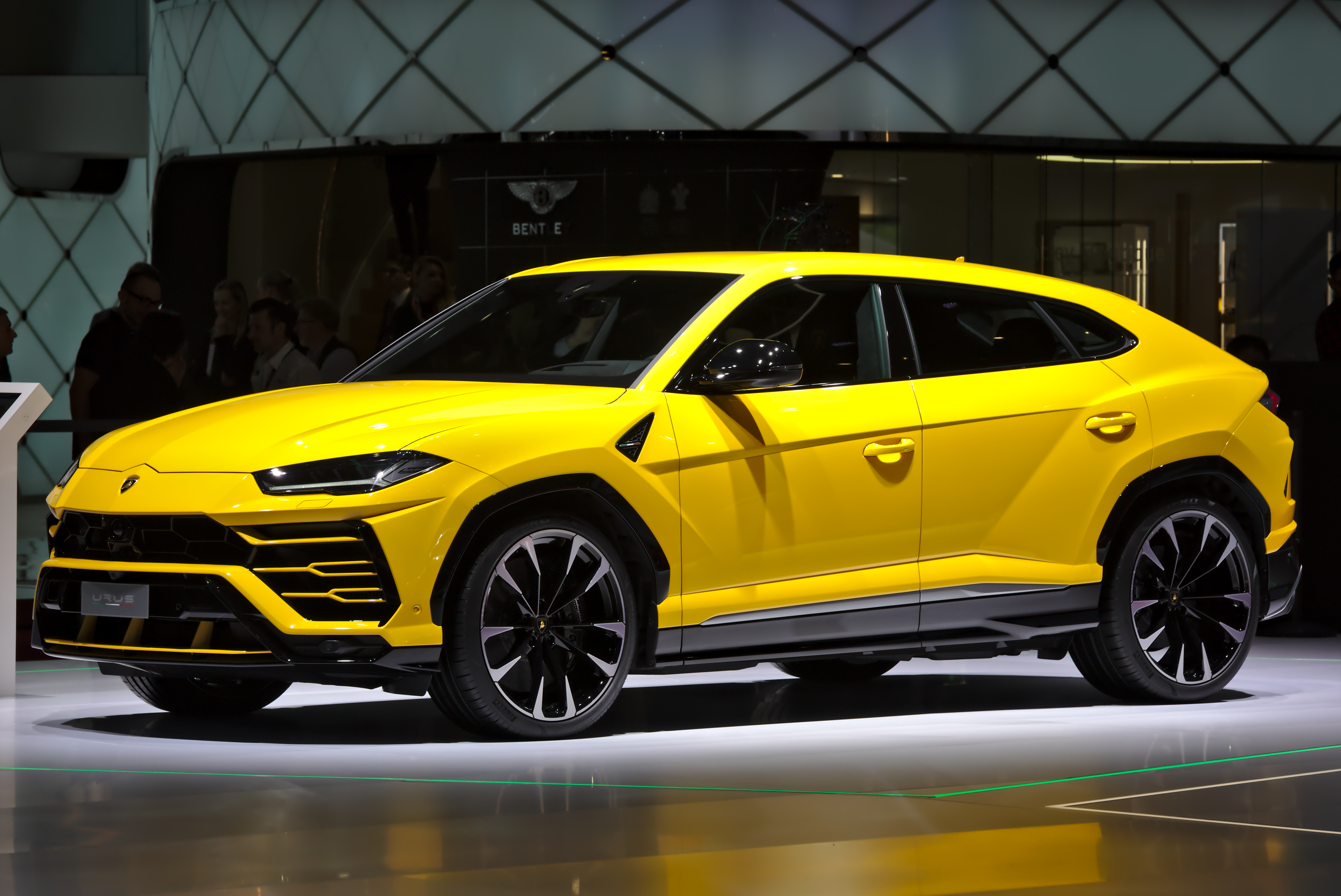
Lamborghini Urus

In 2019, the International Energy Agency (IEA) reported that the global number of SUVs and crossovers on the road multiplied by six since 2010—from 35 million to 200 million vehicles, and their market share has grown to 40 percent of worldwide new light-vehicle sales at the end of the decade.

By 2013, small and compact SUVs had increased to become the third-largest market segment. Since the early 2000s, new versions have been introduced to appeal to a wider audience, such as crossovers and other small SUVs. Larger SUVs also remained popular, with sales of General Motors' large SUV models increasing significantly in 2013.

In 2015, global sales of SUVs overtook the "lower medium car" segment, to become the largest market segment, accounting for 22.9% of "light vehicle" sales in 2015. The following year, worldwide SUV sales experienced further growth of 22%. The world's fastest-growing SUV markets in 2014–2015 were: China (+ 47.9%), Italy (+ 48.6%), Spain (+ 42%), Portugal (+ 54.8 %), and Thailand (+ 56.4%). The SUV segment further grew to 26% of the global passenger car market in 2016, then to 36.8% of the market in Q1–Q3 of 2017.

In the US, share of the SUVs produced grew in the 2010s and keeps growing in the 2020s even faster than in the late 20th century

In the U.S. at the end of 2016, sales of SUVs and light-duty trucks had surpassed traditional car sales for the year by over 3 million units. Manufacturers continued to phase out the production of sedan models, replacing them with new models of SUVs. Luxury brands have increasingly introduced SUV or crossover models in the 2010s. For example: Rolls-Royce Cullinan, Bentley Bentayga, Aston Martin DBX, Maserati Levante, Lamborghini Urus, and Ferrari Purosangue.

In 2019 SUVs made up 47.4% of U.S. sales compared to only 22.1% for sedans.

== Motorsport ==
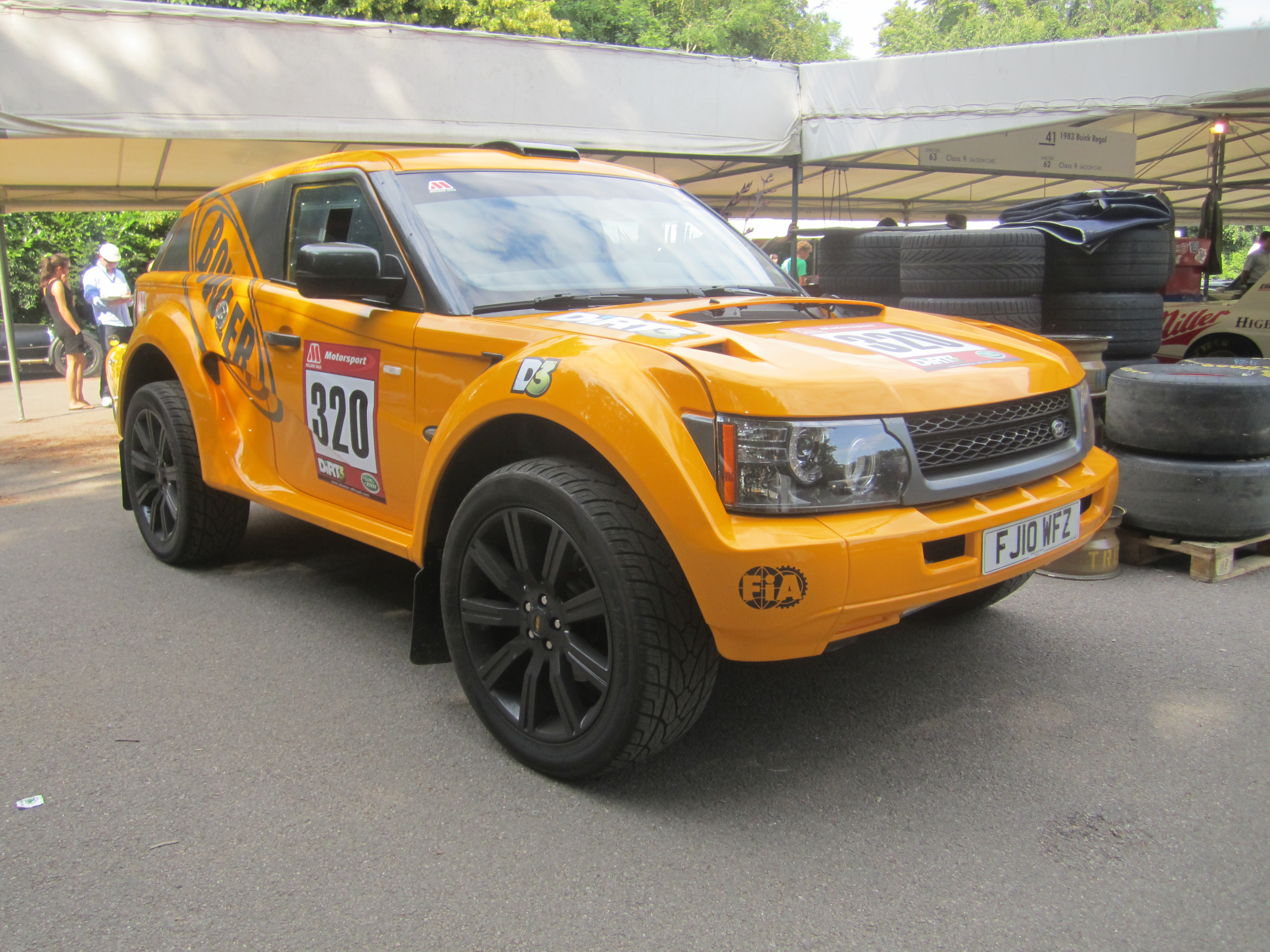
2007 Bowler Nemesis

SUVs have competed in various off-road racing competitions, such as the Dakar Rally, Baja 1000, FIA Cross-Country Rally World Cup, King of the Hammers, and Australasian Safari. SUVs have also competed in the Trophee Andros ice-racing series.

== Nicknames ==
Several derogatory or pejorative terms for SUVs are based on the combination of an affluent suburb name and "tractor", particularly for expensive vehicles from luxury brands. Examples include "Toorak Tractor" (Melbourne, Australia), "Chelsea Tractor" (London, England) and "Remuera Tractor" (Auckland, New Zealand). These terms relate to the theory that four-wheel drive capabilities are not required by affluent SUV owners, and that the SUV is purchased as a status symbol rather than for practical reasons.

In Norway, the term Børstraktor ('Stock Exchange Tractor') serves a similar purpose. In the Netherlands, SUVs are sometimes called "P.C. Hooft-tractors" after the exclusive P.C. Hooftstraat Amsterdam shopping street.

== Commercial SUVs ==
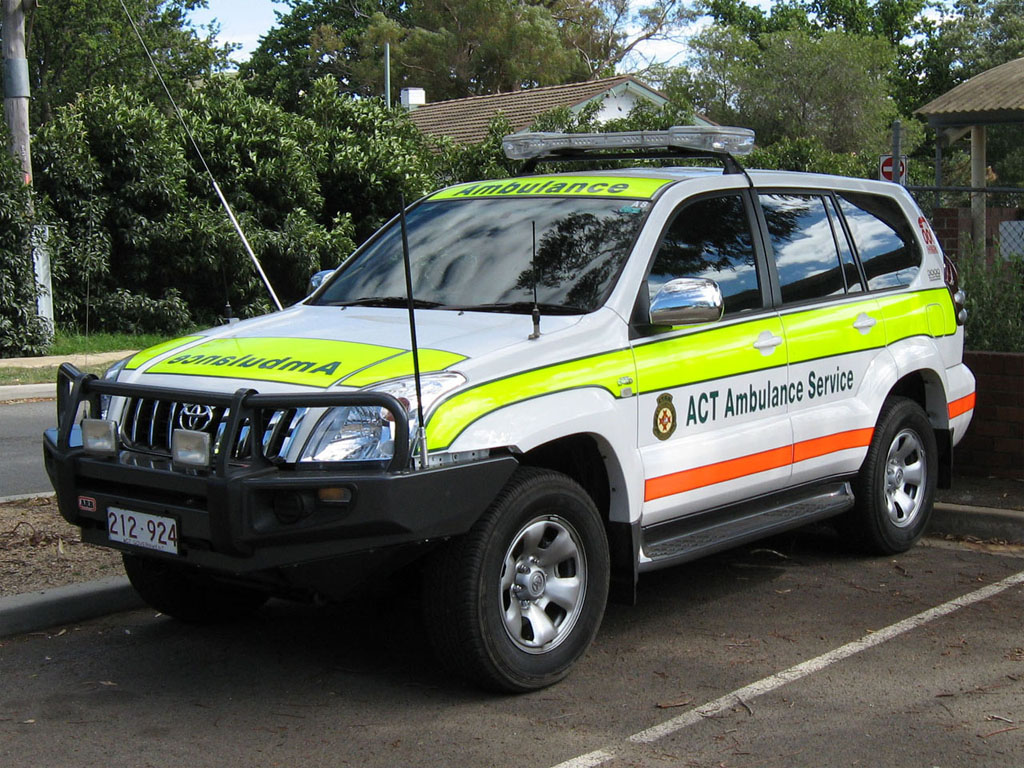
Toyota Land Cruiser Prado used as an ambulance

SUVs are sometimes used for commercial purposes. The category is very similar to panel trucks since the Chevrolet Suburban (an SUV) had panel truck versions, which were used for commercial purposes.

The first SUV-like vehicle that had commercial versions was the Chevrolet Suburban panel truck. Panel trucks by American manufacturers were built until the late 1970s.

While panel trucks manufactured by European manufacturers were rare, commercial versions of off-road vehicles were very common, Land Rover manufactured commercial versions of the Land Rover and the Defender. Commercial SUVs are factory-built and most of them are not independent conversions, which means they can be bought from dealerships and showrooms.

Examples of SUVs used as commercial vehicles in Europe include: Citroen C5 Aircross Commercial SUV, the Land Rover Discovery, the Dacia Duster Flika, and the Mitsubishi Pajero.

== See also ==
- Criticism of sport utility vehicles
- Crossover city car (A-segment SUV)
- Esuvee
- Four-wheel drive
- List of sport utility vehicles
- Off-road vehicle
- Recreational vehicle
