= Opel Geländesportwagen =

Opel Geländesportwagen is an off-road racing car by Opel made from 1934. It has been cited as the first crossover. It was an open 2-seater with an aluminium body on a steel chassis. The bodywork was originally made by Kühn. From 1936, the chassis was made more suitable for off-road driving with shortened frame and more robust details. Autenrieth in Darmstadt made the bodywork for those. The engine was originally the same as the standard cars while the mk2 got the 2.5 litre 6-cylinder engine from the Super Six. From 1938, Opel also used the larger engine from the Kapitän. The reason for building the Geländesportwagen may have been that car trials were popular, but also that Germany was secretly training for war. Fifteen were originally built, with only one still surviving.
