= List of celebrities by net worth =

The following is a list of billionaire celebrities, based on calculations by reputable publications such as Forbes and The Sunday Times Rich List. Through its history, Forbes have included among their "Celebrity Billionaires" lists, tech moguls such as Steve Jobs, or former celebrity and current U.S. president Donald J. Trump. The list include celebrities in fields (Note: Based on fields in lists like Forbes Celebrity 100) from music, cinema to sports and television, while excluding former celebrities.

Reports from other business publications, such as Bloomberg L.P., may differ. For example, they valued David Geffen at US$9.1 billion in 2023, whereas Forbes estimated his net worth at $8.6 billion as of 2024. Celebrities such as Paul McCartney are included in both Forbes and The Sunday Times Rich List rankings in this list, although their estimated net worth may differ. Notable milestones include Forbes identifying J. K. Rowling as the first author to become billionaire in 2004.

== Forbes ==
The following celebrities have achieved billionaire status at some point, either during their lifetime or through posthumous earnings, according to Forbes estimations.

Key
†	Indicates deceased celebrities
‡	Indicates former billionaires

Updated as of March 2026
Celebrity	Nationality	Industries	Net worth	As of	Peak	Namesake photo	Ref.
David Geffen	United States	Cinema/Diversified	$9.3 billion	2025	▲		
Steven Spielberg	United States	Cinema	$7.1 billion	2025	▲		
Mark Cuban	United States	Television/Diversified	$6 billion	2025	▲		
George Lucas	United States	Cinema	$5.2 billion	2025	$7.4 billion		
Walter Salles	Brazil	Cinema/Business	$4.9 billion	2025	▲		
Michael Jordan	United States	Sports	$4.7 billion	2026	▲		
Vince McMahon	United States	Sports/Television	$3.4 billion	2025	▲		
Oprah Winfrey	United States	Television	$3.2 billion	2025	▲		
Jay-Z	United States	Music	$2.8 billion	2025	Steady		
Taylor Swift	United States	Music	$2 billion	2024	▲		
Kim Kardashian	United States	Fashion/Television	$1.9 billion	2025	▲		
Peter Jackson	New Zealand	Cinema	$1.9 billion	2025	▲		
Magic Johnson	United States	Sports/Business	$1.5 billion	2025	$1.6 billion		
Tyler Perry	United States	Television/Cinema	$1.4 billion	2024	▲		
Paul McCartney	United Kingdom	Music	$1.4 billion	2026	▲		
Tiger Woods	United States	Sports	$1.3 billion	2025	$1.7 billion		
Dick Wolf	United States	Television/Cinema	$1.2 billion	2025	Steady		
Matt Stone/Trey Parker	United States	Television	$ 1.2 billion each	2025	Steady		
J. K. Rowling	United Kingdom	Books	$ 1.2 billion	2025	▲		
Bruce Springsteen	United States	Music	$1.2 billion	2025	Steady		
LeBron James	United States	Sports	$1.2 billion	2025	Steady		
Arnold Schwarzenegger	Austria/United States	Sports/Cinema	$1.2 billion	2025	Steady		
Jerry Seinfeld	United States	Television/Cinema	$1.1 billion	2025	Steady		
Roger Federer	Switzerland	Sports/Diversified	$1 billion	2025	$1.1 billion		
Dr. Dre	United States	Musician/Others	$1 billion	2025			
Rihanna	Barbados	Music/Fashion	$1 billion	2025	$1.7 billion		
Beyoncé	United States	Music	$1 billion	2025	Steady		
Jimmy Buffett	United States	Music/Others	$1 billion	2023 †	Steady		
Kylie Jenner	United States	Cosmetics/Television/Fashion	$670 million ‡	2025	$1 billion		
Kanye West	United States	Music/Fashion	$400 million ‡	2024	$2 billion		

== Other publications ==
The following celebrities have become billionaire at some point, either during their lifetime or through posthumous earnings, according to estimations by other reputable business-related publications, such as Bloomberg and Sunday Times Rich List.

Celebrity	Nationality	Industries	Net worth	As of	Peak	Namesake photo	Estimated by	Ref.
Michael Jackson/Estate	United States	Music	$2 billion (Note: Combined during his life and after his death)	2024	Steady		Various	
Paul McCartney	United Kingdom	Music	£1 billion ($1.3 billion)	2024	Steady		Sunday Times Rich List	
Selena Gomez (Note: However, Forbes estimates Selena Gomez net worth at $700 million, as of 2025.)	United States	Music/Fashion	$1.3 billion	2024	Steady		Bloomberg	
Andrew Lloyd Webber	United Kingdom	Music	£504 million ($626 million) ‡	2023	£820 million ($1.05 billion)		Sunday Times Rich List	

== See also ==
- The World's Billionaires
- Bloomberg Billionaires Index
- Forbes Top 40 (1987–1998)
- Forbes Celebrity 100 (1999–2020)
- Forbes list of the world's highest-paid musicians
- Forbes list of the world's highest-paid dead celebrities
- List of music artists by net worth
