= Forbes Celebrity 100 =

Annual ranking by Forbes magazine

Celebrity 100 was an annual list compiled and published by Forbes magazine from 1999 to 2020, preceded by the Forbes Top 40 entertainers list. Until 2014, the rankings were made based on a complex combination of factors, including earnings, social media following, magazine covers and a range of qualitative metrics, with the aim of "measuring power". Since 2015, Forbes had solely factored pretax earnings (from June of the previous year through June of the publishing year), before deducting fees for managers, lawyers and agents.

== Celebrity 100 lists ==
Below is the top 10 for each year since the list's inception.

=== Top 10 most powerful celebrities ===
1999
No.	Recipient	Career
1	(United States) Michael Jordan	Sportsperson (basketball)
2	(United States) Oprah Winfrey	Television personality
3	(United States) Leonardo DiCaprio	Actor
4	(United States) Jerry Seinfeld	Comedian
5	(United States) Steven Spielberg	Filmmaker
6	(United Kingdom) Spice Girls	Musicians
7	(United States) Harrison Ford	Actor
8	(United States) Robin Williams	Comedian
9	(Canada) Celine Dion	Musician
10	(United Kingdom) The Rolling Stones	Musicians

- Note: Jerry Seinfeld was the highest-paid celebrity of 1999, with $267 million.

2000
No.	Recipient	Career
1	(United States) Julia Roberts	Actress
2	(United States) George Lucas	Filmmaker
3	(United States) Oprah Winfrey	Television personality
4	(United States) Tom Hanks	Actor
5	(United States) Michael Jordan	Sportsperson (basketball)
6	(United Kingdom) The Rolling Stones	Musicians
7	(United States) Tiger Woods	Sportsperson (golf)
8	(United States) Backstreet Boys	Musicians
9	(United States) Cher	Musician
10	(United States) Steven Spielberg	Filmmaker

- Note: George Lucas was the highest-paid celebrity of 2000, with $400 million.

2001
No.	Recipient	Career
1	(United States) Tom Cruise	Actor
2	(United States) Tiger Woods	Sportsperson (golf)
3	(United Kingdom) The Beatles	Musicians
4	(United States) Britney Spears	Musician
5	(United States) Bruce Willis	Actor
6	(United States) Michael Jordan	Sportsperson (basketball)
7	(United States) Backstreet Boys	Musicians
8	(United States) NSYNC	Musicians
9	(United States) Oprah Winfrey	Television personality
10	(United States) Mel Gibson	Actor

- Note: George Lucas was the highest-paid celebrity of 2001, with $250 million.

2002
No.	Recipient	Career
1	(United States) Britney Spears	Musician
2	(United States) Tiger Woods	Sportsperson (golf)
3	(United States) Steven Spielberg	Filmmaker
4	(United States) Madonna	Musician
5	(Republic of Ireland) U2	Musicians
6	(United States) NSYNC	Musicians
7	(United States) Mariah Carey	Musicians
8	(United States) Oprah Winfrey	Television personality
9	(United States) Michael Jordan	Sportsperson (basketball)
10	(United States) Tom Hanks	Actor

- Note: George Lucas was the highest-paid celebrity of 2002, with $200 million.

2003
No.	Recipient	Career
1	(United States) Jennifer Aniston	Actress
2	(United States) Eminem/ (United States) Dr. Dre	Musicians
3	(United States) Tiger Woods	Sportsperson (golf)
4	(United States) Steven Spielberg	Filmmaker
5	(United States) Jennifer Lopez	Musician and actress
6	(United Kingdom) Paul McCartney	Musician
7	(United States) Ben Affleck	Actor
8	(United States) Oprah Winfrey	Television personality
9	(United States) Tom Hanks	Actor
10	(United Kingdom) The Rolling Stones	Musicians

- Note: Steven Spielberg was the highest-paid celebrity of 2003, with $200 million.

2004
No.	Recipient	Career
1	(United States) Mel Gibson	Actor
2	(United States) Tiger Woods	Sportsperson (golf)
3	(United States) Oprah Winfrey	Television personality
4	(United States) Tom Cruise	Actor
5	(United Kingdom) The Rolling Stones	Musicians
6	(United Kingdom) J.K. Rowling	Writer
7	(United States) Michael Jordan	Sportsperson (basketball)
8	(United States) Bruce Springsteen	Musician
9	(United States) Steven Spielberg	Filmmaker
10	(United States) Johnny Depp	Actor

- Note: Mel Gibson was the highest-paid celebrity of 2004, with $210 million.

2005
No.	Recipient	Career
1	(United States) Oprah Winfrey	Television personality
2	(United States) Tiger Woods	Sportsperson (golf)
3	(United States) Mel Gibson	Actor
4	(United States) George Lucas	Filmmaker
5	(United States) Shaquille O'Neal	Sportsperson (basketball)
6	(United States) Steven Spielberg	Filmmaker
7	(United States) Johnny Depp	Actor
8	(United States) Madonna	Musician
9	(United Kingdom) Elton John	Musician
10	(United States) Tom Cruise	Actor

- Note: George Lucas was the highest-paid celebrity of 2005, with $290 million.

2006
No.	Recipient	Career
1	(United States) Tom Cruise	Actor
2	(United Kingdom) The Rolling Stones	Musicians
3	(United States) Oprah Winfrey	Television personality
4	(Republic of Ireland) U2	Musicians
5	(United States) Tiger Woods	Sportsperson (golf)
6	(United States) Steven Spielberg	Filmmaker
7	(United States) Howard Stern	Radio personality
8	(United States) 50 Cent	Musician
9	(United States) James Gandolfini, Lorraine Bracco, Edie Falco, Michael Imperioli, Jamie-Lynn Sigler	Actors
10	(United States) Dan Brown	Writer

- Note: Steven Spielberg was the highest-paid celebrity of 2006, with $332 million.

2007
No.	Recipient	Career
1	(United States) Oprah Winfrey	Television personality
2	(United States) Tiger Woods	Sportsperson (golf)
3	(United States) Madonna	Musician
4	(United Kingdom) The Rolling Stones	Musicians
5	(United States) Brad Pitt	Actor
6	(United States) Johnny Depp	Actor
7	(United Kingdom) Elton John	Musician
8	(United States) Tom Cruise	Actor
9	(United States) Jay-Z	Musician
10	(United States) Steven Spielberg	Filmmaker

- Note: Oprah Winfrey was the highest-paid celebrity of 2007, with $260 million.

2008
No.	Recipient	Career
1	(United States) Oprah Winfrey	Television personality
2	(United States) Tiger Woods	Sportsperson (golf)
3	(United States) Angelina Jolie	Actress
4	(United States) Beyoncé	Musician
5	(United Kingdom) David Beckham	Sportsperson (association football)
6	(United States) Johnny Depp	Actor
7	(United States) Jay-Z	Musician
8	(United Kingdom) The Police	Musicians
9	(United Kingdom) J.K. Rowling	Writer
10	(United States) Brad Pitt/ (United States) Paula Deen	Actor / Television personality

- Note: J. K. Rowling was the highest-paid celebrity of 2008, with $300 million.

2009
No.	Recipient	Career
1	(United States) Angelina Jolie	Actress
2	(United States) Oprah Winfrey	Television personality
3	(United States) Madonna	Musician
4	(United States) Beyoncé	Musician
5	(United States) Tiger Woods	Sportsperson (golf)
6	(United States) Bruce Springsteen	Musician
7	(United States) Steven Spielberg	Filmmaker
8	(United States) Jennifer Aniston	Actress
9	(United States) Brad Pitt	Actor
10	(United States) Kobe Bryant	Sportsperson (basketball)

- Note: Oprah Winfrey was the highest-paid celebrity of 2009, with $275 million.

2010
No.	Recipient	Career
1	(United States) Oprah Winfrey	Television personality
2	(United States) Beyoncé	Musician
3	(Canada) James Cameron	Filmmaker
4	(United States) Lady Gaga	Musician
5	(United States) Tiger Woods	Sportsperson (golf)
6	(United States) Britney Spears	Musician
7	(Republic of Ireland) U2	Musicians
8	(United States) Sandra Bullock	Actress
9	(United States) Johnny Depp	Actor
10	(United States) Madonna	Musician

- Note: Oprah Winfrey was the highest-paid celebrity of 2010, with $315 million.

2011
No.	Recipient	Career
1	(United States) Lady Gaga	Musician
2	(United States) Oprah Winfrey	Television personality
3	(Canada) Justin Bieber	Musician
4	(Republic of Ireland) U2	Musicians
5	(United Kingdom) Elton John	Musician
6	(United States) Tiger Woods	Sportsperson (golf)
7	(United States) Taylor Swift	Musician
8	(United States) Bon Jovi	Musician
9	(United Kingdom) Simon Cowell	Television personality
10	(United States) LeBron James	Sportsperson (basketball)

- Note: Oprah Winfrey was the highest-paid celebrity of 2011, with $290 million.

2012
No.	Recipient	Career
1	(United States) Jennifer Lopez	Musician and actress
2	(United States) Oprah Winfrey	Television personality
3	(Canada) Justin Bieber	Musician
4	(Barbados) Rihanna	Musician
5	(United States) Lady Gaga	Musician
6	(United States) Britney Spears	Musician
7	(United States) Kim Kardashian	Television personality
8	(United States) Katy Perry	Musician
9	(United States) Tom Cruise	Actor
10	(United States) Steven Spielberg	Filmmaker

- Note: Oprah Winfrey was the highest-paid celebrity of 2012, with $165 million.

2013
No.	Recipient	Career
1	(United States) Oprah Winfrey	Television personality
2	(United States) Lady Gaga	Musician
3	(United States) Steven Spielberg	Filmmaker
4	(United States) Beyoncé	Musician
5	(United States) Madonna	Musician
6	(United States) Taylor Swift	Musician
7	(United States) Bon Jovi	Musicians
8	(Switzerland) Roger Federer	Sportsperson (tennis)
9	(Canada) Justin Bieber	Musician
10	(United States) Ellen DeGeneres	Television personality

- Note: Madonna was the highest-paid celebrity of 2013, with $125 million.

2014
No.	Recipient	Career
1	(United States) Beyoncé	Musician
2	(United States) LeBron James	Sportsperson (basketball)
3	(United States) Dr. Dre	Musician
4	(United States) Oprah Winfrey	Television personality
5	(United States) Ellen DeGeneres	Television personality
6	(United States) Jay-Z	Musician
7	(United States) Floyd Mayweather Jr.	Sportsperson (boxing)
8	(Barbados) Rihanna	Musician
9	(United States) Katy Perry	Musician
10	(United States) Robert Downey Jr.	Actor

- Note: Dr. Dre was the highest-paid celebrity of 2014, with $620 million.

=== Top 10 highest-paid celebrities ===
2015
No.	Recipient	Career
1	(United States) Floyd Mayweather Jr.	Sportsperson (boxing)
2	(Philippines) Manny Pacquiao	Sportsperson (boxing)
3	(United States) Katy Perry	Musician
4	(United Kingdom) / (Republic of Ireland) One Direction	Musicians
5	(United States) Howard Stern	Television personality
6	(United States) Garth Brooks	Musician
7	(United States) James Patterson	Author
8	(United States) Robert Downey Jr.	Actor
8	(United States) Taylor Swift	Musician
10	(Portugal) Cristiano Ronaldo	Sportsperson (association football)

2016
No.	Recipient	Career
1	(United States) Taylor Swift	Musician
2	(United Kingdom) / (Republic of Ireland) One Direction	Musicians
3	(United States) James Patterson	Author
4	(Portugal) Cristiano Ronaldo	Sportsman (association football)
4	(United States) Dr. Phil McGraw	Television personality
6	(United States) Kevin Hart	Comedian
7	(United States) Howard Stern	Radio personality
8	(Argentina) Lionel Messi	Sportsman (association football)
9	(United Kingdom) Adele	Musician
10	(United States) Rush Limbaugh	Radio personality

2017
No.	Recipient	Career
1	(United States) Sean "Diddy" Combs	Musician
2	(United States) Beyoncé	Musician
3	(United Kingdom) J. K. Rowling	Author
4	(Canada) Drake	Musician
5	(Portugal) Cristiano Ronaldo	Athlete (association football)
6	(Canada) The Weeknd	Musician
7	(United States) Howard Stern	Radio personality
8	(United Kingdom) Coldplay	Musicians
9	(United States) James Patterson	Author
10	(United States) LeBron James	Athlete (basketball)

2018
No.	Recipient	Career
1	(United States) Floyd Mayweather Jr.	Athlete (boxing)
2	(United States) George Clooney	Actor
3	(United States) Kylie Jenner	Personality
4	(United States) Judge Judy Sheindlin	Television personality
5	(United States) Dwayne Johnson	Actor
6	(Republic of Ireland) U2	Musicians
7	(United Kingdom) Coldplay	Musicians
8	(Argentina) Lionel Messi	Athlete (association football)
9	(United Kingdom) Ed Sheeran	Musician
10	(Portugal) Cristiano Ronaldo	Athlete (association football)

2019
No.	Recipient	Career
1	(United States) Taylor Swift	Musician
2	(United States) Kylie Jenner	Personality
3	(United States) Kanye West	Rapper
4	(Argentina) Lionel Messi	Athlete (association football)
5	(United Kingdom) Ed Sheeran	Musician
6	(Portugal) Cristiano Ronaldo	Athlete (association football)
7	(Brazil) Neymar	Athlete (association football)
8	(United States) The Eagles	Music group
9	(United States) Phil McGraw	Television personality
10	(Mexico) Saul "Canelo" Alvarez	Athlete (boxer)

2020
No.	Recipient	Career
1	(United States) Kylie Jenner	Media personality
2	(United States) Kanye West	Rapper
3	(Switzerland) Roger Federer	Athlete (tennis)
4	(Portugal) Cristiano Ronaldo	Athlete (association football)
5	(Argentina) Lionel Messi	Athlete (association football)
6	(United States) Tyler Perry	Actor
7	(Brazil) Neymar	Athlete (association football)
8	(United States) Howard Stern	Radio personality
9	(United States) LeBron James	Athlete (basketball)
10	(United States) Dwayne Johnson	Actor

== See also ==
- Forbes Top 40 (1987–1998)
- Forbes list of the world's highest-paid musicians
- Forbes list of the world's highest-paid dead celebrities
- Forbes China Celebrity 100
- Forbes Korea Power Celebrity 40
- List of music artists by net worth
- List of celebrities by net worth
