= The Last Days of Michael Jackson =

2018 American television documentary

- Genre: Documentary
- Country of origin: United States

Production
- Producers: Mark Anstendig; Monica DelaRosa

Original release
- Network: ABC
- Release: May 24, 2018

The Last Days of Michael Jackson is a two-hour television special that premiered on ABC on May 24, 2018. The special is dedicated to Michael Jackson's life and legacy and is chronicling everything from his childhood to the comeback concerts, This Is It, that he never got to perform. It will also feature never-before-seen interviews he did with Barbara Walters and Diane Sawyer, as well as conversations with his friends and family. The special was watched by 5.56 million viewers and was met with negative response.

The Michael Jackson Estate criticized the TV special in a statement a day before it aired, stating that it "is not sponsored or approved by Jackson’s heirs, and will most likely violate their intellectual property rights. - We believe the special to be another crass and unauthorized attempt to exploit the life, music and image of Michael Jackson without respect for Michael’s legacy, intellectual property rights or his children - It is particularly disheartening that Disney, a company known to strongly believe in protecting its own IP rights, would choose to ignore these rights belonging to the Estate".

== Cast ==
"The star needs some space, give him a chance to relax, - He has a heart. He is human. Let him have a bed, a pillow. What more can I give? - People expect more and more because once it's done, it is immortal, - You can't go back."

— Michael Jackson (archived audio)
- Michael Jackson (archive footage)
- Karen Faye (archive footage)
- Diane Sawyer (archive footage)
- Barbara Walters (archive footage)
- Frank Cascio (archive footage)
- Chris Connelly
- Joe Jackson (archive footage)
- Margo Jefferson
- Steve Knopper
- Kym Mazelle
- Navi
- Kenny Ortega (archive footage)
- Randy Phillips
- Ryan Smith
- J. Randy Taraborrelli
- Tohme R. Tohme
- Toure
- Mike Walters

== Release ==
The Last Days of Michael Jackson was shown on the American television network ABC on May 24, 2018. The first trailer was on May 18, 2018.

== Reception ==
=== Viewership ===
On its premiere airing, the special was watched by 5.56 million viewers.

=== Reaction ===
The documentary received negative reviews from fans and critics alike for the many inaccuracies, while it interviewed paparazzi, tabloid reporters and people who never met Jackson, which made the special feel more like an opinion piece then a factual documentary about his life. The special received backlash for purposely ignoring crucial details, for not mentioning his skin disorder called Vitiligo, for not mentioning the abuse he received by his father as a child and also no mention of his humanitarian and charity efforts.

== Lawsuit ==
The Estate of Michael Jackson have filed a federal copyright infringement lawsuit against the Walt Disney Company and ABC TV, alleging the companies used dozens of copyrights without permission when the TV network aired the two-hour special.
