= Estate of Michael Jackson =

Administrating entity of Michael Jackson's property

The estate of Michael Jackson is a legal entity established following the death of American singer Michael Jackson on June 25, 2009, for the purpose of administering his property and overseeing his posthumous income. Jackson's last will was filed by the attorney John Branca at the Los Angeles County courthouse on July 1, 2009. Signed July 7, 2002, it names Branca and accountant John McClain (McClain died on May 26, 2026) as executors; they were confirmed as such by a Los Angeles judge on July 6, 2009. All assets are given to the (pre-existing) Michael Jackson Family Trust (amended March 22, 2002), the details of which have not been made public. The Associated Press reported that, in 2007, Jackson had a net worth of US$237 million: $568 million in assets, which included Neverland Ranch and his 50% share of the Sony/ATV Music Publishing catalog, and debts of $331 million. The guardianship of his three children was given to his mother, Katherine, or if she was unable or unwilling, to singer Diana Ross. According to Jackson's will, his assets and posthumous earnings are allocated to a trust, with 40% to his mother, 40% to his three children, and the remaining 20% to unspecified charities.

In 2012, in an attempt to end a family dispute, Jackson's brother Jermaine retracted his signature on a public letter criticizing the executors of Jackson's estate and his mother's advisers over the legitimacy of Michael's will. T.J. Jackson, son of Tito Jackson, was given co-guardianship of Michael's children after false reports of Katherine having gone missing. Media reports suggested that the settlement of Jackson's estate could last many years.

The value of Sony/ATV Music Publishing was estimated to be $1.5 billion. The estimate made Jackson's share of Sony/ATV worth $750 million, from which Jackson would have had an annual income of $80 million. In September 2016, a deal was finalized for Sony's acquisition of Jackson's share of Sony/ATV from the Jackson estate for $750 million.

In 2016, Jackson's estate earned $825 million, the highest yearly amount for a celebrity ever recorded by Forbes. In July 2018, Sony/ATV bought out the Jackson estate's 10% stake in EMI for $287.5 million.

== Earnings ==
In 2016, Forbes estimated annual gross earnings by the Jackson Estate at $825 million, the largest ever recorded for a celebrity, mostly due to the sale of the Sony/ATV catalog. In 2018, the figure was $400 million. It was the eighth year since his death that Jackson's annual earnings were reported to be over $100 million, thus bringing Jackson's posthumous total to $2.4 billion. Jackson was the top-earning dead celebrity each year after his death through 2025, except 2012, 2021 and 2022.

=== Taxation of estate ===
The estate administrators and the IRS estimated portions of the estate differently. The estate argued that its total value was $5.1 million, while the IRS initially estimated the estate's value at more than $500 million and then reduced it to $482 million. The IRS also proposed "an additional $197 million in penalties, including a gross valuation misstatement penalty." A major part of the dispute related to the value of Jackson's likeness; the estate claimed a value of just over $2,000; while the IRS initially valued it at over $434 million. Other disputes centered on the value of Jackson's interest in a trust that owns some songs of his and the Beatles; the value of Jackson's share of the Jackson 5 master recordings rights; and the values of various stocks, bonds, and cars owned by Jackson.

In 2013, the estate filed a U.S. Tax Court petition claiming that the IRS overestimated the value of the estate's assets. In 2021, the Tax Court issued a ruling in favor of the estate, ruling that the estate's total combined value of the estate was $112 million and that the value of Jackson's name and likeness was $4 million (not the $61 million estimated by the IRS's outside expert witness).

== Lawsuits ==
In 2013, Craig J. Williams and his production company, Noval Williams Films, announced the intent to release a 45-minute documentary film, alternatively titled both Michael: The Last Photo Shoots and Michael Jackson: The Last Photo Shoots, utilizing footage of Jackson taken during photoshoots with L'Uomo Vogue and Ebony during 2007. The documentary was to be told through the viewpoint of the workers who set up and ran the sessions, such as assistants, stylists, and photographers. The estate disputed the use of the footage and sought to block the documentary's release, reporting that the footage was owned by the estate and that Jackson had not authorized the public or commercial use of the footage prior to his death.

Williams and Noval Williams Films filed a lawsuit against the estate, stating that they held valid rights to the footage as the estate had passed on the chance to purchase the footage in 2011 from Hasaun Muhammad, who they reported as previously owning the rights. A lawyer for the estate responded by claiming that the footage was work-for-hire and that the copyright would have remained with Jackson. The lawsuit went to trial in 2018. The judge for the case noted that neither side could definitively prove who owned the rights, as Jackson was deceased and Muhammad was 'elusive'. The judge recommended that the case be seen before a jury and approved a motion to strike testimony from Muhammad and another individual as he did not believe that either would be available to testify in court. The court later granted a joint motion for dismissal with prejudice after denying motions for summary judgement.

In July 2025, Michael's daughter Paris formally objected to the estate's request for legal fees, raising concerns about "irregular payments", including so‑called "premium payments" for unrecorded attorney time and urged the court to deny the fee request until full invoicing was provided.

== See also ==
- List of largest music deals
- List of music artists by net worth
- List of celebrities by net worth
- Forbes list of the world's highest-paid dead celebrities
