= Forbes list of the world's highest-paid musicians =

Annual ranking by Forbes magazine

The highest-paid musicians in the world have been reported annually by Forbes since 1987. For measurement, the magazine used pretax earnings—before deducting fees for agents, managers or lawyers. Most of the lists were estimated within a June-to-June scoring period, except for 1999–2000 and 2021 onwards when a calendar year period was used instead.

U2 became the annual highest-paid musician five times, more than any other act. They were also the highest-paid music group in a record eight different years. Michael Jackson became the first musician to earn over $100 million in a year (1989), and has become the highest-paid male soloist a record seven times. Dr. Dre currently holds the record for the highest annual earnings for a musician, collecting $620 million in 2014, mainly through the sales of his headphone-manufacturing company, Beats Electronics.

Madonna is the first woman in music to earn $100 million for a year (2009) and has become the highest-paid female musician a record 11 times. Taylor Swift remains the female musician with the highest official annual earnings ever with $185 million in 2019, breaking the previous record set by herself in 2016 with $170 million.

== Highest-paid musicians by year ==
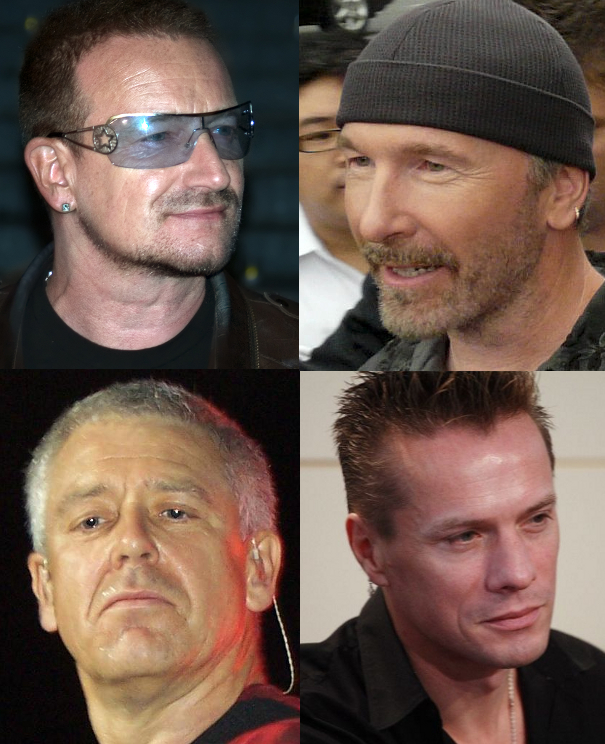
U2 became the annual highest-paid musician a record five times and the annual highest-paid music group a record eight times.

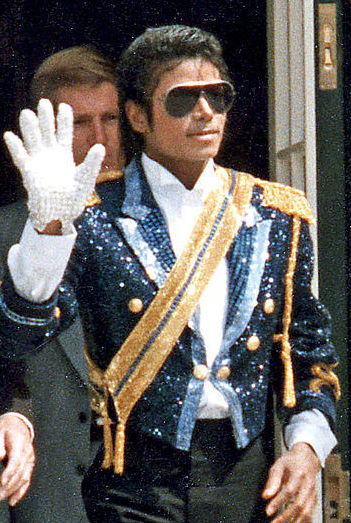
Michael Jackson became the annual highest-paid musician three times and the annual highest-paid male solo musician a record seven times.

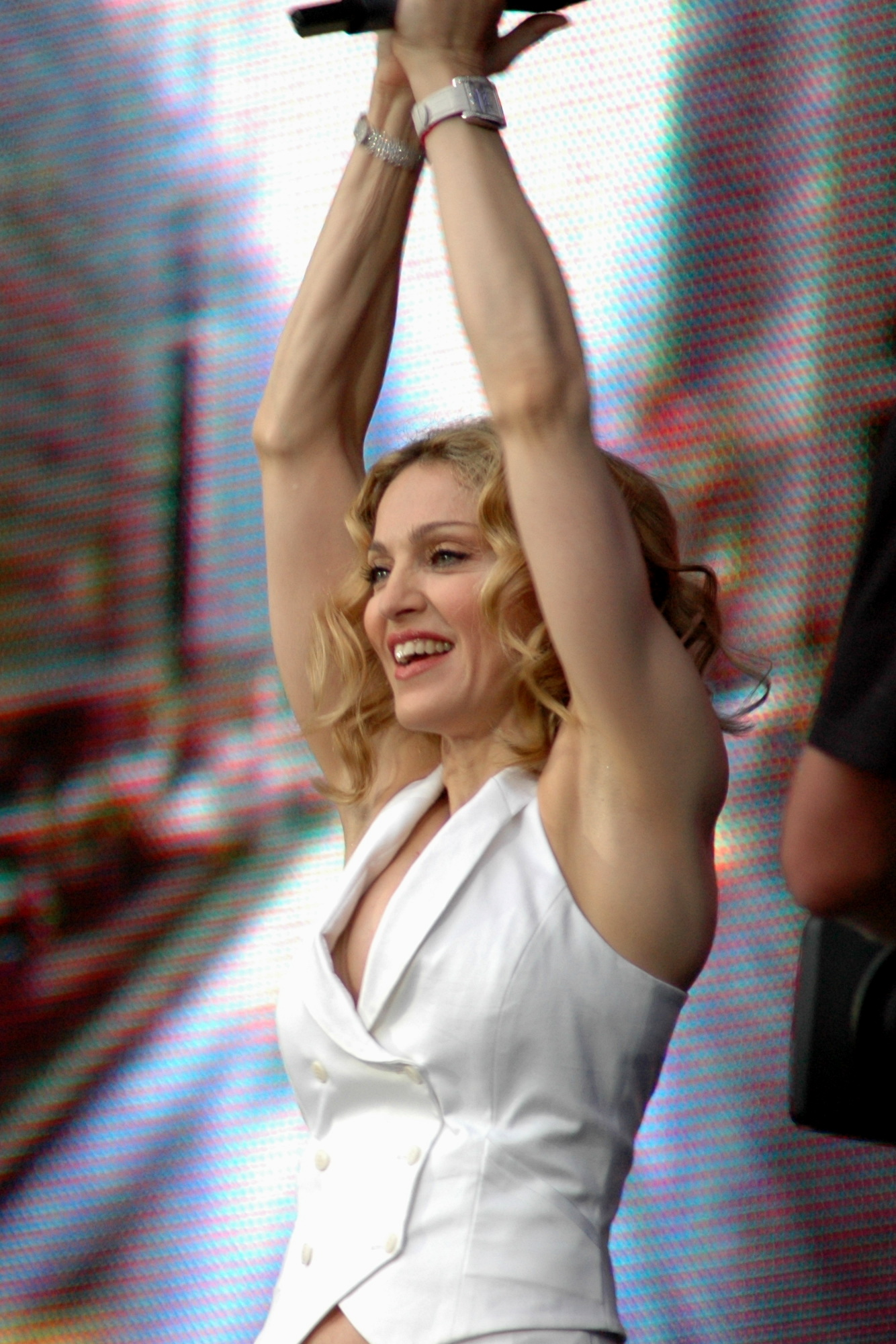
Madonna became the annual highest-paid musician three times and the annual highest-paid female musician a record eleven times.

Key
*	Indicates the year's highest-paid celebrity (all fields of entertainment)
†	Indicates the year's highest-paid musician overall

Highest-paid musicians of the year
Year	Musician	Nationality	Earnings	Adjusted earnings (in 2025 dollar)	Ref.
1987	Bruce Springsteen	United States	$56 million	$159 million	
1988	Michael Jackson *	United States	$97 million	$264 million	
1989	Michael Jackson *	United States	$125 million	$325 million	
1990	Michael Jackson	United States	$100 million	$246 million	
1991	New Kids on the Block *	United States	$115 million	$272 million	
1992	New Kids on the Block	United States	$62 million	$142 million	
1993	Guns N' Roses	United States	$53 million	$118 million	
1994	Pink Floyd	United Kingdom	$62 million	$135 million	
1995	The Beatles	United Kingdom	$130 million	$275 million	
1996	The Beatles	United Kingdom	$130 million	$267 million	
1997	The Beatles	United Kingdom	$98 million	$197 million	
1998	The Rolling Stones	United Kingdom	$57 million	$113 million	
1999	Backstreet Boys	United States	$60 million	$116 million	
2000	The Beatles	United Kingdom	$70 million	$127 million	
2001	Unpublished (Note: Forbes published the Celebrity 100 list in 2001. However, the earnings used to calculate the list was from calendar year 2000.)				
2002	U2	Ireland	$69 million	$124 million	
2003	The Rolling Stones	United Kingdom	$66.5 million	$116 million	
2004	Bruce Springsteen	United States	$64 million	$109 million	
2005	Madonna	United States	$50 million	$82 million	
2006	U2	Ireland	$110 million	$176 million	
2007	The Rolling Stones	United Kingdom	$110 million	$171 million	
2008	The Police	United Kingdom	$115 million	$172 million	
2009	Madonna	United States	$110 million	$165 million	
2010	U2	Ireland	$130 million	$192 million	
2011	U2	Ireland	$195 million	$279 million	
2012	Dr. Dre	United States	$110 million	$154 million	
2013	Madonna *	United States	$125 million	$173 million	
2014	Dr. Dre *	United States	$620 million	$843 million	
2015	Katy Perry	United States	$135 million	$183 million	
2016	Taylor Swift *	United States	$170 million	$228 million	
2017	Diddy *	United States	$130 million	$171 million	
2018	U2	Ireland	$118 million	$151 million	
2019	Taylor Swift *	United States	$185 million	$233 million	
2020	Kanye West	United States	$170 million	$211 million	
2021	Bruce Springsteen	United States	$435 million	$517 million	
2022	Genesis	United Kingdom	$230 million	$253 million	
2023	Unpublished				
2024	Unpublished				
2025	The Weeknd	Canada	$298 million	$306 million	

=== Group ===
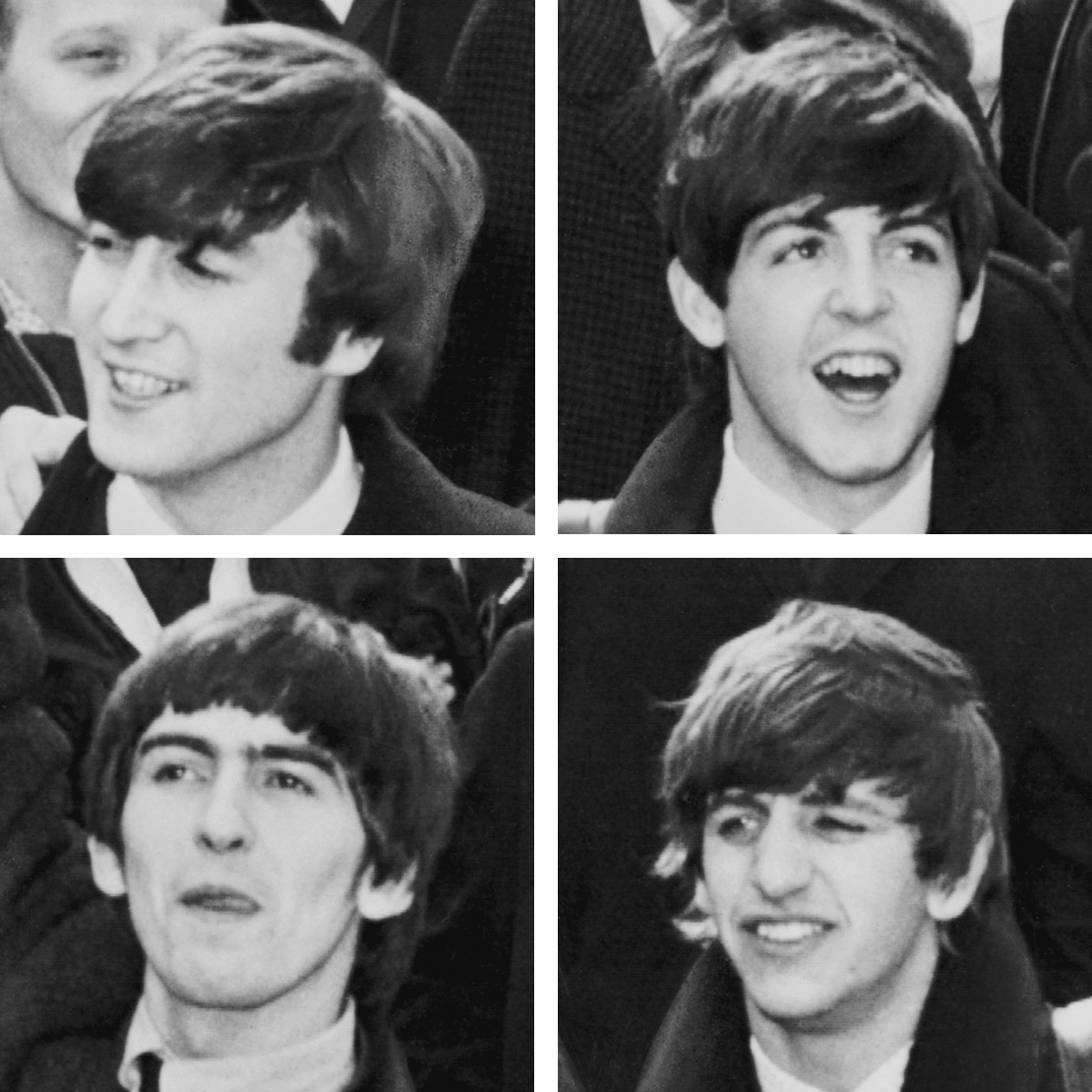
The Beatles became the annual highest-paid musician four times and the annual highest-paid music group four times.

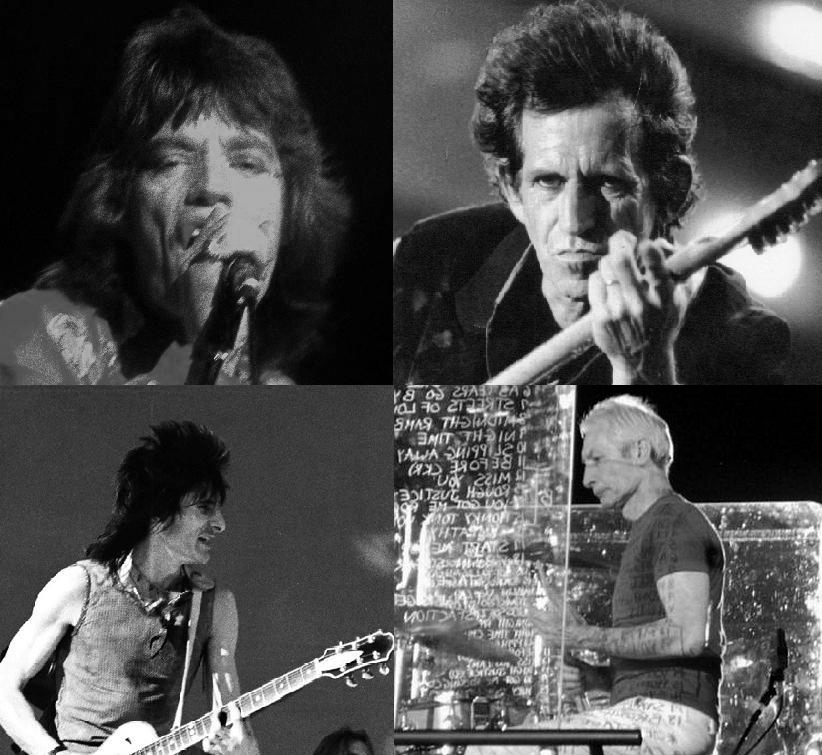
The Rolling Stones became the annual highest-paid musician three times and the annual highest-paid music group five times.

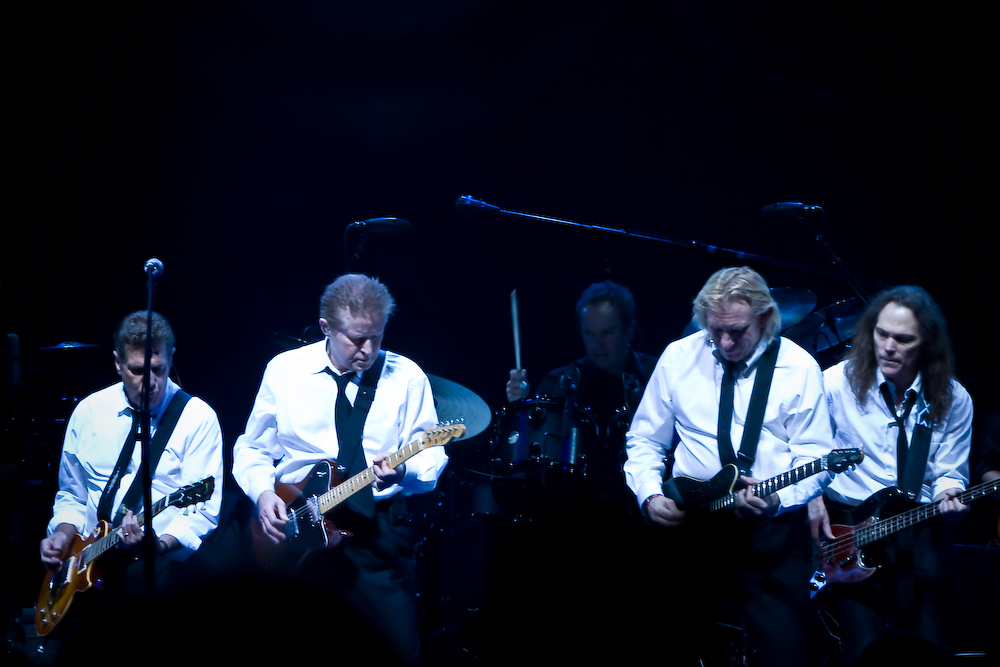
Eagles became the annual highest-paid music group three times.

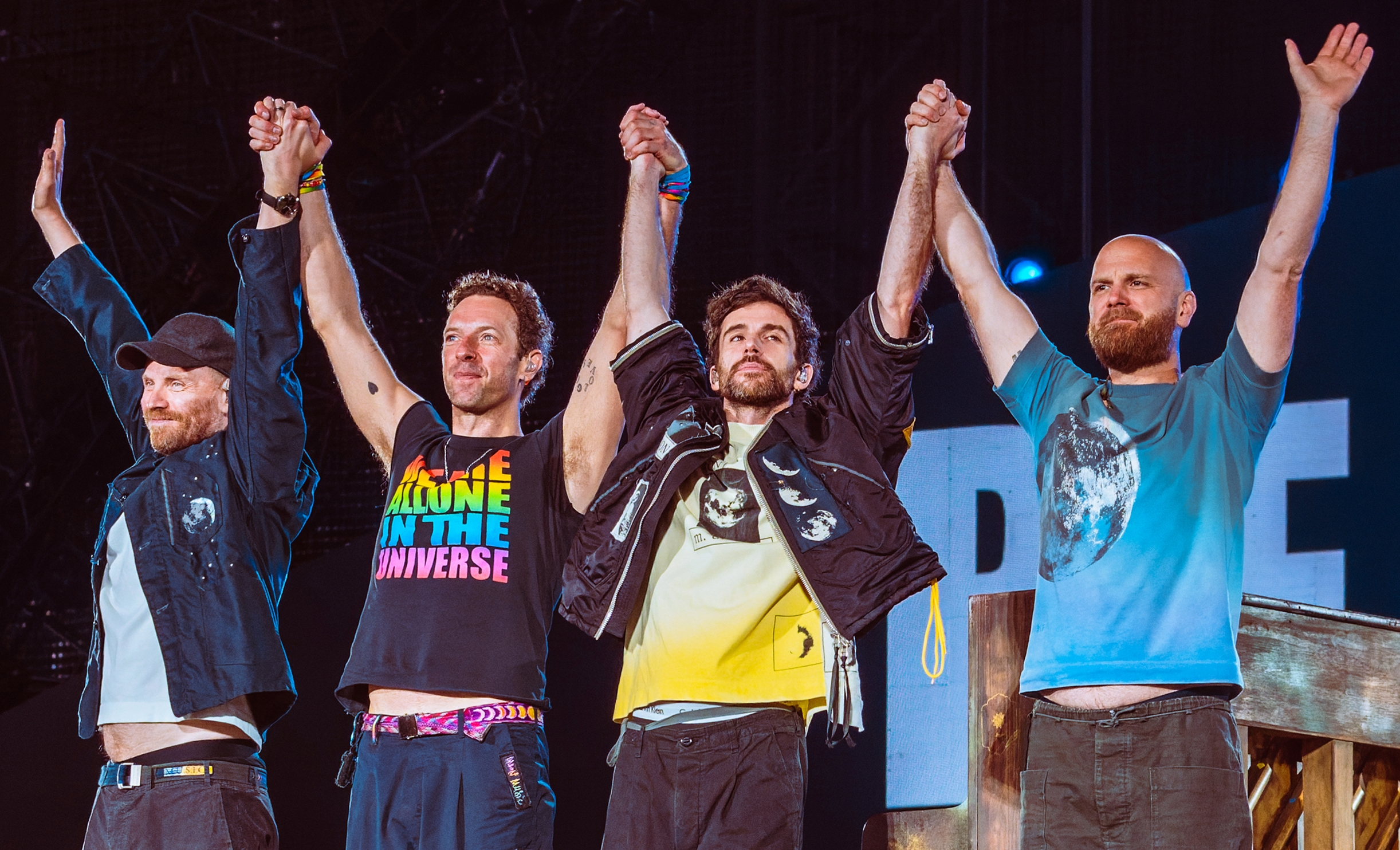
Coldplay became the annual highest-paid music group three times.

Highest-paid music groups of the year
Year	Music group	Nationality	Earnings	Adjusted earnings (in 2025 dollar)	Ref.
1987	U2	Ireland	$37 million	$105 million	
1988	U2	Ireland	$42 million	$114 million	
1989	Pink Floyd	United Kingdom	$56 million	$145 million	
1990	The Rolling Stones	United Kingdom	$88 million	$217 million	
1991	New Kids on the Block *	United States	$115 million	$272 million	
1992	New Kids on the Block †	United States	$62 million	$142 million	
1993	Guns N' Roses †	United States	$53 million	$118 million	
1994	Pink Floyd †	United Kingdom	$62 million	$135 million	
1995	The Beatles †	United Kingdom	$130 million	$275 million	
1996	The Beatles †	United Kingdom	$130 million	$267 million	
1997	The Beatles †	United Kingdom	$98 million	$197 million	
1998	The Rolling Stones †	United Kingdom	$57 million	$113 million	
1999	Backstreet Boys †	United States	$60 million	$116 million	
2000	The Beatles †	United Kingdom	$70 million	$127 million	
2001	Unpublished				
2002	U2 †	Ireland	$69 million	$124 million	
2003	The Rolling Stones †	United Kingdom	$66.5 million	$116 million	
2004	The Rolling Stones	United Kingdom	$51 million	$87 million	
2005	Eagles	United States	$45 million	$74 million	
2006	U2 †	Ireland	$110 million	$176 million	
2007	The Rolling Stones †	United Kingdom	$110 million	$171 million	
2008	The Police †	United Kingdom	$115 million	$172 million	
2009	Coldplay	United Kingdom	$70 million	$105 million	
2010	U2 †	Ireland	$130 million	$192 million	
2011	U2 †	Ireland	$195 million	$279 million	
2012	U2	Ireland	$78 million	$109 million	
2013	Bon Jovi	United States	$79 million	$109 million	
2014	Eagles	United States	$100 million	$136 million	
2015	One Direction	United Kingdom / Ireland	$130 million	$177 million	
2016	One Direction	United Kingdom / Ireland	$110 million	$148 million	
2017	Coldplay	United Kingdom	$88 million	$116 million	
2018	U2 †	Ireland	$118 million	$147 million	
2019	Eagles	United States	$100 million	$126 million	
2020	Jonas Brothers	United States	$68.5 million	$85 million	
2021	Red Hot Chili Peppers	United States	$116 million	$138 million	
2022	Genesis †	United Kingdom	$230 million	$253 million	
2023	Unpublished				
2024	Unpublished				
2025	Coldplay	United Kingdom	$105 million	$108 million	

=== Male ===
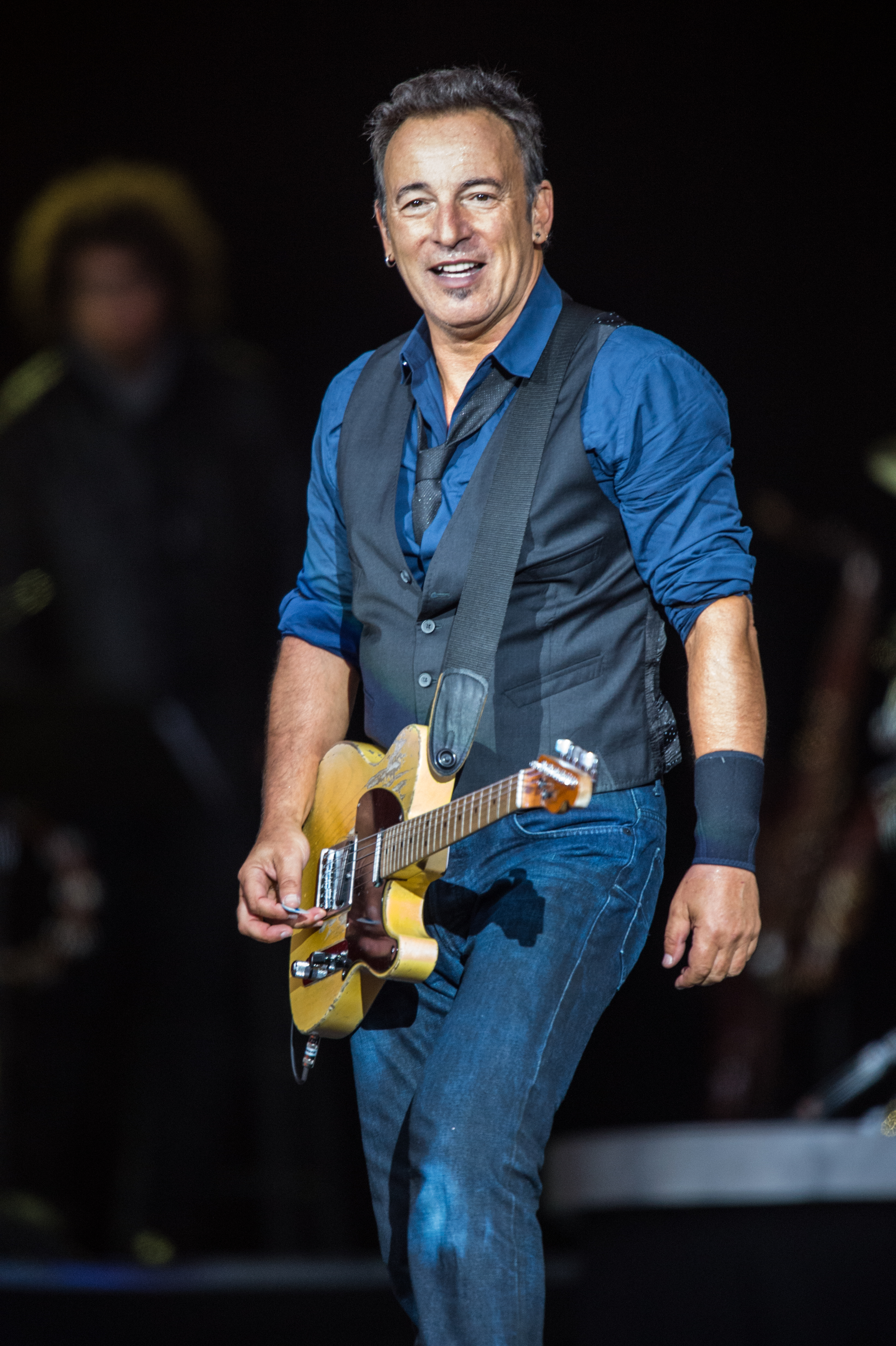
Bruce Springsteen became the annual highest-paid musician three times and the annual highest-paid male solo musician six times.

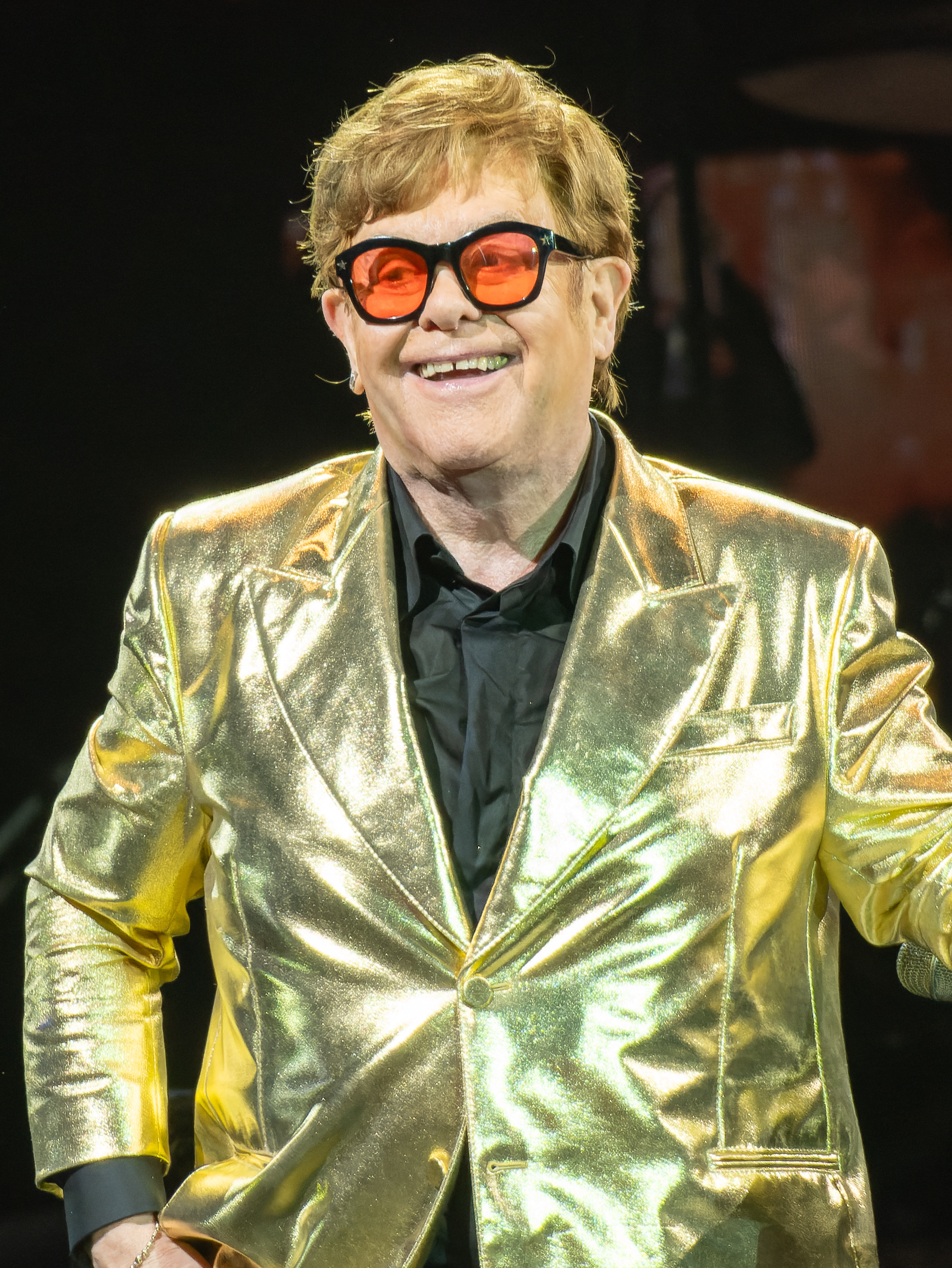
Elton John became the annual highest-paid male solo musician three times.

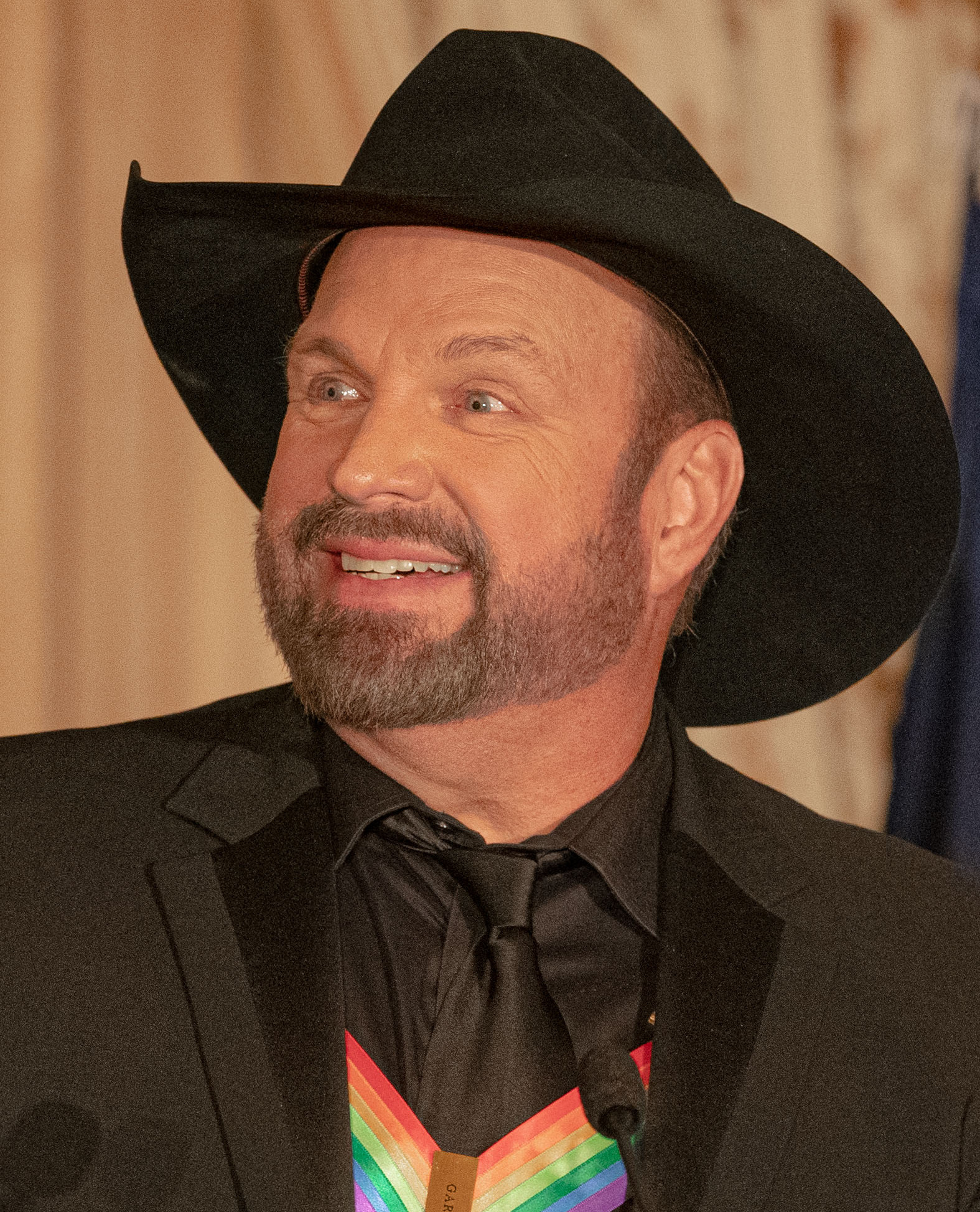
Garth Brooks became the annual highest-paid male solo musician three times.

Highest-paid male solo musicians of the year
Year	Musician	Nationality	Earnings	Adjusted earnings (in 2025 dollar)	Ref.
1987	Bruce Springsteen †	United States	$56 million	$159 million	
1988	Michael Jackson *	United States	$97 million	$264 million	
1989	Michael Jackson *	United States	$125 million	$325 million	
1990	Michael Jackson †	United States	$100 million	$246 million	
1991	Michael Jackson	United States	$60 million	$142 million	
1992	Michael Jackson	United States	$51 million	$117 million	
1993	Prince	United States	$49 million	$109 million	
1994	Garth Brooks	United States	$41 million	$89 million	
1995	Michael Jackson	United States	$67 million	$142 million	
1996	Michael Jackson	United States	$90 million	$185 million	
1997	David Bowie	United Kingdom	$63 million	$126 million	
1998	Master P	United States	$56.5 million	$112 million	
1999	Lou Bega (Note: Male soloists were largely absent in 1999. Lou Bega was only ranked 76th on the overall celebrity earnings list.)	Germany	$6 million	$12 million	
2000	Dr. Dre	United States	$35 million	$64 million	
2001	Unpublished				
2002	Elton John	United Kingdom	$30 million	$54 million	
2003	Paul McCartney	United Kingdom	$59 million	$103 million	
2004	Bruce Springsteen †	United States	$64 million	$109 million	
2005	Prince	United States	$49.7 million	$82 million	
2006	Bruce Springsteen	United States	$55 million	$88 million	
2007	Elton John	United Kingdom	$53 million	$82 million	
2008	Toby Keith	United States	$48 million	$72 million	
2009	Bruce Springsteen	United States	$70 million	$105 million	
2010	Bruce Springsteen	United States	$70 million	$103 million	
2011	Elton John	United Kingdom	$100 million	$143 million	
2012	Dr. Dre †	United States	$110 million	$154 million	
2013	Toby Keith	United States	$65 million	$90 million	
2014	Dr. Dre *	United States	$620 million	$843 million	
2015	Garth Brooks	United States	$90 million	$122 million	
2016	Garth Brooks	United States	$70 million	$94 million	
2017	Diddy *	United States	$130 million	$171 million	
2018	Ed Sheeran	United Kingdom	$110 million	$141 million	
2019	Kanye West	United States	$150 million	$189 million	
2020	Kanye West †	United States	$170 million	$211 million	
2021	Bruce Springsteen †	United States	$435 million	$517 million	
2022	Sting	United Kingdom	$210 million	$231 million	
2023	Unpublished				
2024	Unpublished				
2025	The Weeknd †	Canada	$298 million	$306 million	

=== Female ===
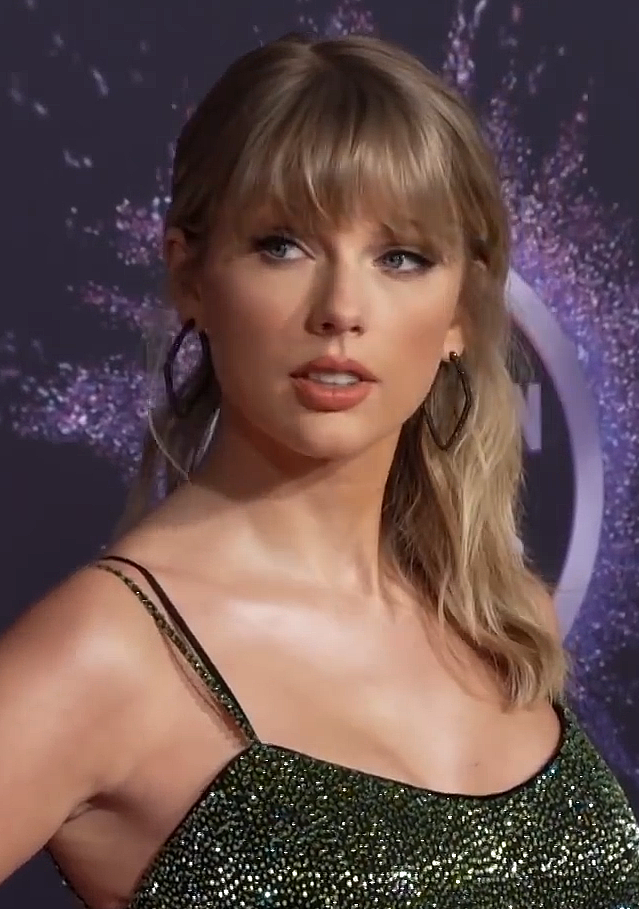
Taylor Swift became the annual highest-paid musician twice and the annual highest-paid female musician five times.

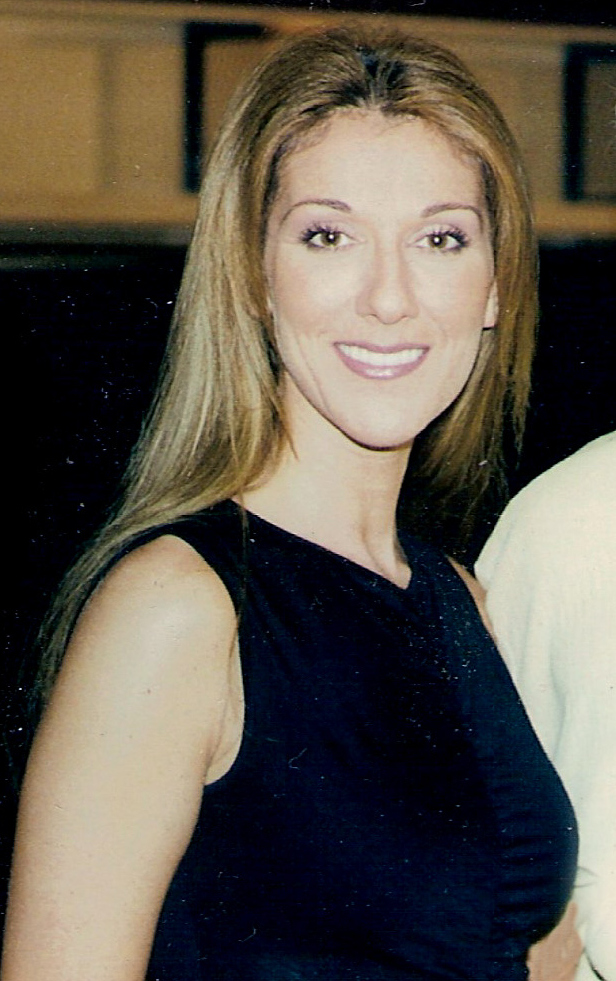
Celine Dion became the annual highest-paid female musician four times.

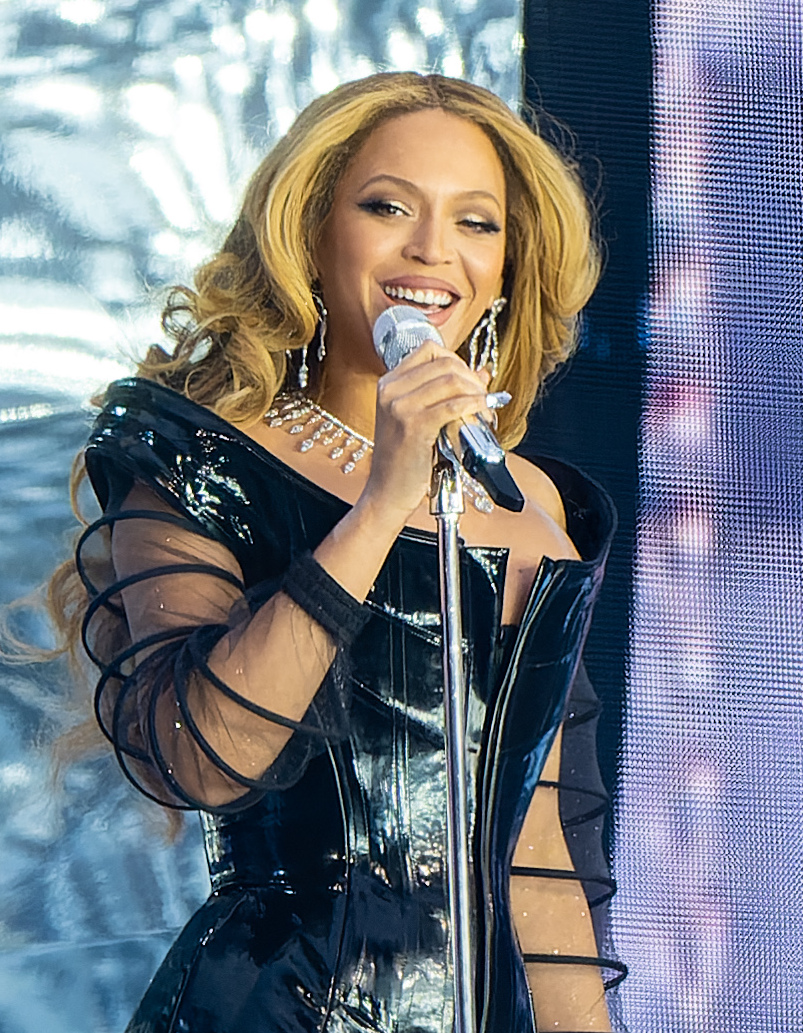
Beyoncé became the annual highest-paid female musician four times.

Highest-paid female musicians of the year
Year	Musician	Nationality	Earnings	Adjusted earnings (in 2025 dollar)	Ref.
1987	Madonna	United States	$47 million	$133 million	
1988	Madonna	United States	$46 million	$125 million	
1989	Madonna	United States	$43 million	$112 million	
1990	Madonna	United States	$62 million	$153 million	
1991	Madonna	United States	$63 million	$149 million	
1992	Madonna	United States	$48 million	$110 million	
1993	Madonna	United States	$37 million	$82 million	
1994	Barbra Streisand	United States	$57 million	$124 million	
1995	Barbra Streisand	United States	$63 million	$133 million	
1996	Mariah Carey	United States	$32 million	$66 million	
1997	Celine Dion	Canada	$65 million	$130 million	
1998	Celine Dion	Canada	$55.5 million	$110 million	
1999	Shania Twain	Canada	$48 million	$93 million	
2000	Britney Spears	United States	$38.5 million	$70 million	
2001	Unpublished				
2002	Mariah Carey	United States	$58 million	$104 million	
2003	Cher	United States	$33.1 million	$58 million	
2004	Celine Dion	Canada	$28 million (Note: Although Forbes listed Celine Dion and Cher each with rounded earnings of $28 million in 2004, the former was ranked higher than the latter.)	$48 million	
2005	Madonna †	United States	$50 million	$82 million	
2006	Celine Dion	Canada	$40 million	$64 million	
2007	Madonna	United States	$72 million	$112 million	
2008	Beyoncé	United States	$80 million	$120 million	
2009	Madonna †	United States	$110 million	$165 million	
2010	Beyoncé	United States	$87 million	$128 million	
2011	Lady Gaga	United States	$90 million	$129 million	
2012	Britney Spears	United States	$58 million	$81 million	
2013	Madonna *	United States	$125 million	$173 million	
2014	Beyoncé	United States	$115 million	$156 million	
2015	Katy Perry †	United States	$135 million	$183 million	
2016	Taylor Swift *	United States	$170 million	$228 million	
2017	Beyoncé	United States	$105 million	$138 million	
2018	Katy Perry	United States	$83 million	$106 million	
2019	Taylor Swift *	United States	$185 million	$233 million	
2020	Ariana Grande	United States	$72 million	$90 million	
2021	Taylor Swift	United States	$52 million	$62 million	
2022	Taylor Swift	United States	$92 million	$101 million	
2023	Unpublished				
2024	Unpublished				
2025	Taylor Swift	United States	$202 million	$207 million	

== Highest-paid musicians by decade ==
=== 2010s ===
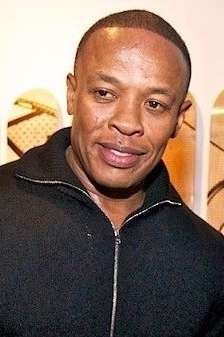
Dr. Dre became the highest-paid musician of the 2010s decade.

Top 10 highest-paid musicians of the 2010s decade
Rank	Musician	Nationality	Earnings	Adjusted earnings (in 2025 dollar)
1	Dr. Dre	United States	$950 million	$1,196 million
2	Taylor Swift	United States	$825 million	$1,039 million
3	Beyoncé	United States	$685 million	$863 million
4	U2	Ireland	$675 million	$850 million
5	Diddy	United States	$605 million	$762 million
6	Elton John	United Kingdom	$565 million	$711 million
7	Jay-Z	United States	$560 million	$705 million
8	Paul McCartney	United Kingdom	$535 million	$674 million
9	Katy Perry	United States	$530 million	$667 million
10	Lady Gaga	United States	$500 million	$630 million

== See also ==
- Forbes Top 40 – list of highest-paid celebrities (1987–1998)
- Forbes Celebrity 100 – list of most powerful celebrities (1999–2014) and highest-paid celebrities (2015–2020)
- Forbes list of the world's highest-paid dead celebrities
- List of music artists by net worth

== Print sources ==
- McAleer, Dave (1991). Chart Beats. Guinness Publishing. ISBN 0851129641.
- Glenday, Craig (2015). Guinness World Records 2015. Guinness Publishing.
