= Forbes Top 40 =

Annual ranking of 40 highest-paid entertainers

The Forbes Top 40 was an annual list of 40 highest-paid entertainers compiled and published by Forbes magazine from 1987 until 1998. The following year, 1999, it was recreated as the Forbes Celebrity 100. The list was published every September, compiled by using the income of performers over two years to overcome the year-to-year of a performer's income.

Forbes representatives said that those individual are "more than entertainers, they are businesses", declaring: "Not only do they create wealth for the entertainment industry and their business sponsors, they create wealth for the nation in exportable merchandize in the form of TV programming, motion pictures, and videocassette and music recordings".

== Forbes Top 40 lists ==
Below is the top 10 for each year since the list's inception.

=== 1980s ===
1987
No.	Recipient	Career
1	(United States) Bill Cosby	Television personality
2	(United States) Sylvester Stallone	Actor
3	(United States) Bruce Springsteen	Musician
4	(United States) Charles Schulz	Cartoonist
5	(United States) Eddie Murphy	Actor
6	(United States) Steven Spielberg	Filmmaker
7	(United States) Madonna	Musician
8	(United States) Whitney Houston	Musician
9	(United States) Michael Jackson	Musician
10	(United States) Johnny Carson	Television personality

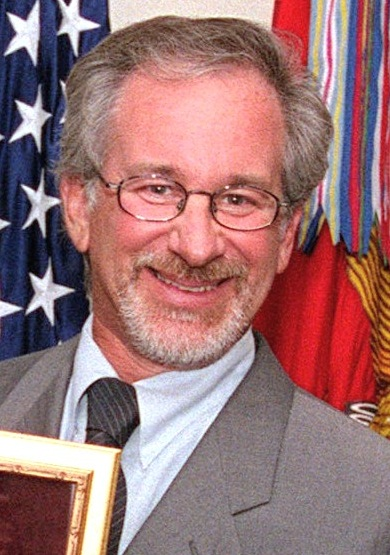
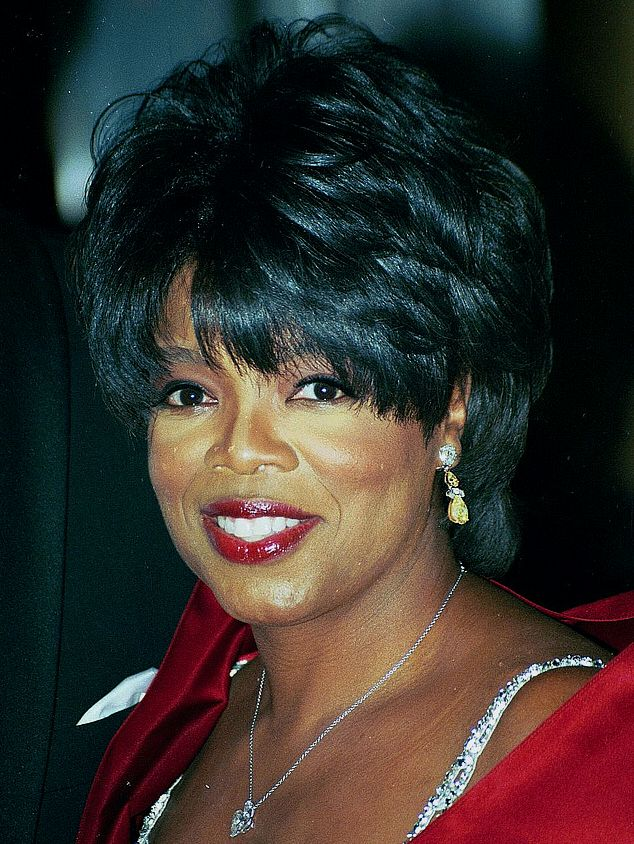
Steven Spielberg and Oprah Winfrey, have the most Top 10 appearances, with 12 and 10 respectively. Spielberg topped the list three times, while Winfrey did so twice.

1988
No.	Recipient	Career
1	(United States) Michael Jackson	Musician
2	(United States) Bill Cosby	Television personality
3	(United States) Steven Spielberg	Filmmaker
4	(United States) Sylvester Stallone	Actor
5	(United States) Eddie Murphy	Actor
6	(United States) Charles Schulz	Cartoonist
7	(United States) Bruce Springsteen	Musician
8	(United States) Mike Tyson	Sportsperson (Boxing)
9	(United States) Madonna	Musician
10	(United States) Arnold Schwarzenegger	Actor

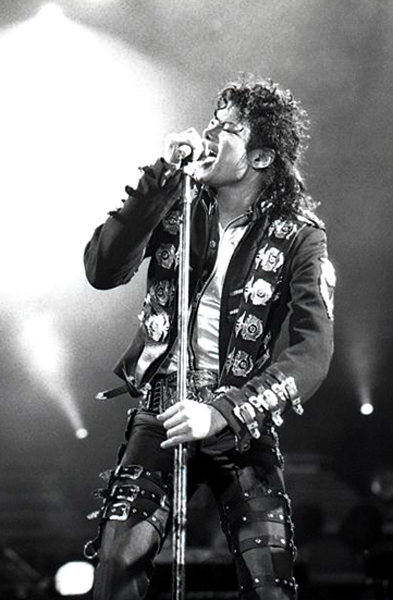
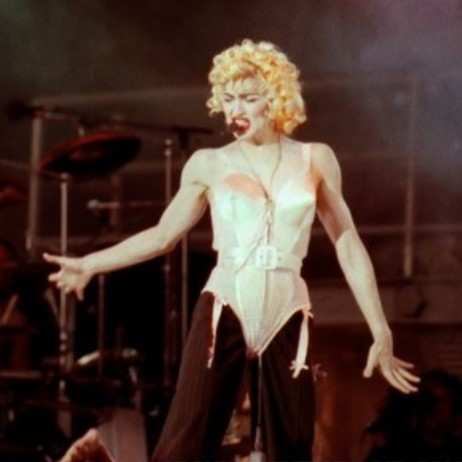
Michael Jackson and Madonna, were the most frequent solo music performers in the Top 10, with eight and five appearances, respectively.

1989
No.	Recipient	Career
1	(United States) Michael Jackson	Musician
2	(United States) Steven Spielberg	Filmmaker
3	(United States) Bill Cosby	Television personality
4	(United States) Mike Tyson	Sportsperson (Boxer)
5	(United States) Charles Schulz	Cartoonist
6	(United States) Eddie Murphy	Actor
7	(United Kingdom) Pink Floyd	Musicians
8	(United Kingdom) The Rolling Stones	Musicians
9	(United States) Oprah Winfrey	Television personality
10	(United Kingdom) George Michael	Musician

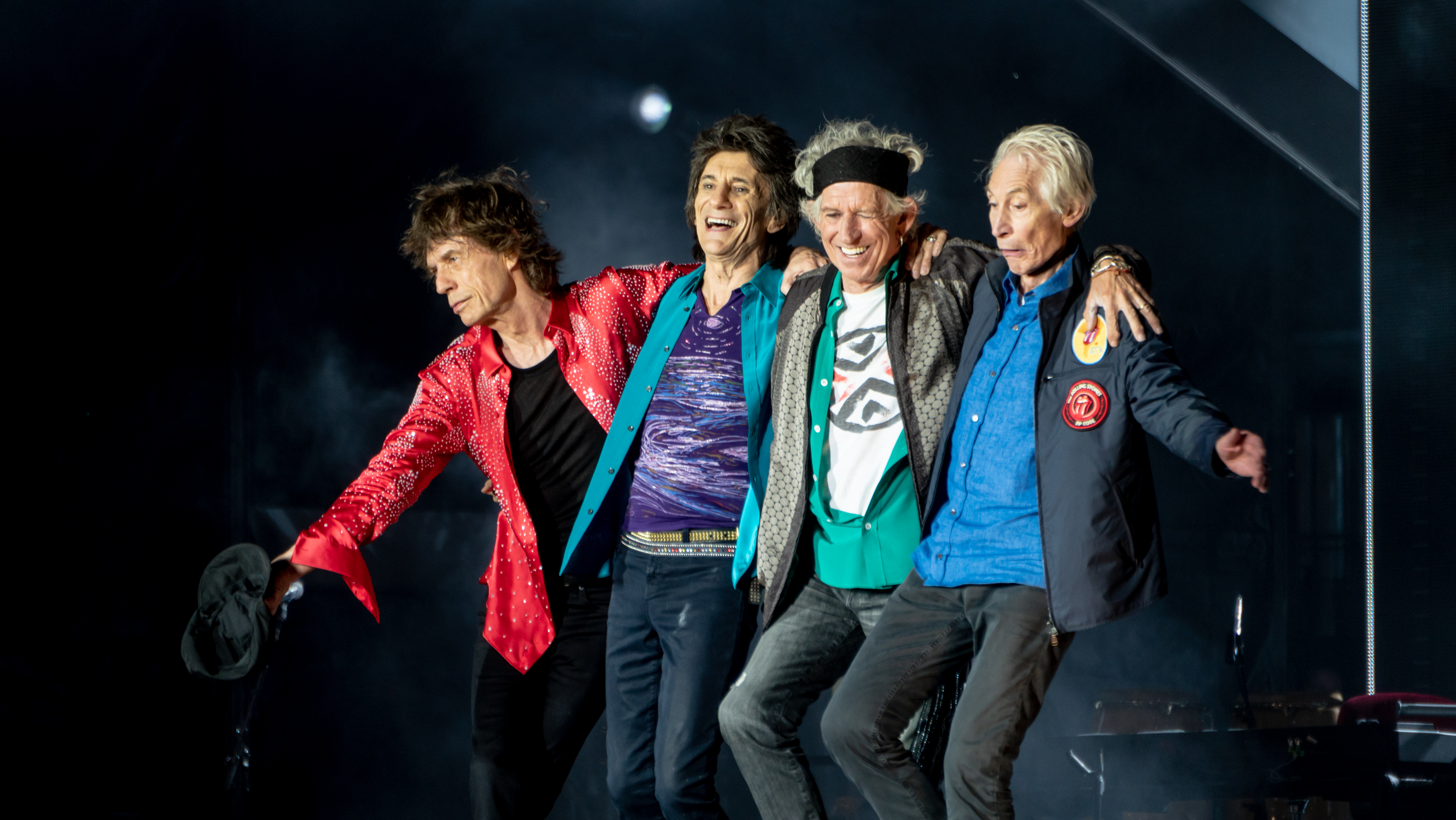
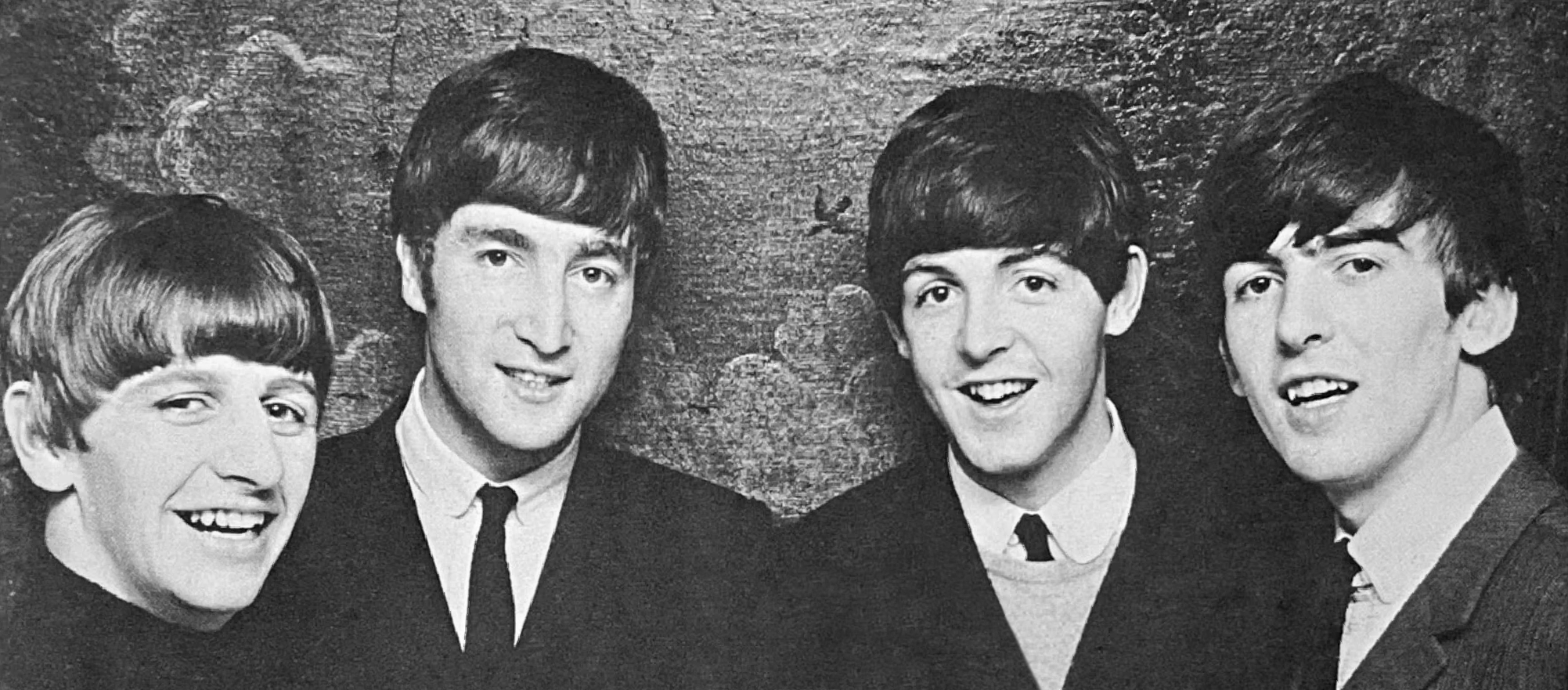
The Rolling Stones had the most appearances among music bands (7), as well as among non-American entertainers. The Beatles achieved the highest rankings among non-Americans.

=== 1990s ===
1990
No.	Recipient	Career
1	(United States) Bill Cosby	Television personality
2	(United States) Michael Jackson	Musician
3	(United Kingdom) The Rolling Stones	Musicians
4	(United States) Steven Spielberg	Filmmaker
5	(United States) New Kids on the Block	Musicians
6	(United States) Oprah Winfrey	Television personality
7	(United States) Sylvester Stallone	Actor
8	(United States) Madonna	Musician
9	(United States) Arnold Schwarzenegger	Actor
10	(United States) Charles Schulz	Cartoonist

1991
No.	Recipient	Career
1	(United States) New Kids on the Block	Musician
2	(United States) Bill Cosby	Television personality
3	(United States) Oprah Winfrey	Television personality
4	(United States) Madonna	Musician
5	(United States) Michael Jackson	Musician
6	(United States) Kevin Costner	Actor
7	(United States) Johnny Carson	Television personality
8	(United Kingdom) The Rolling Stones	Musicians
9	(United States) Charles Schulz	Cartoonist
10	(United States) Steven Spielberg	Filmmaker

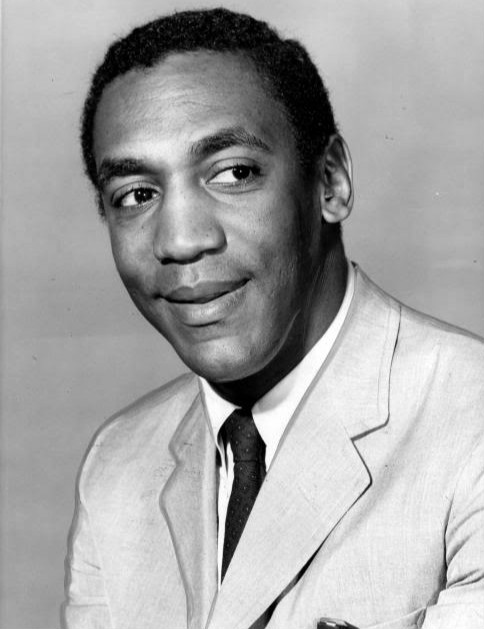
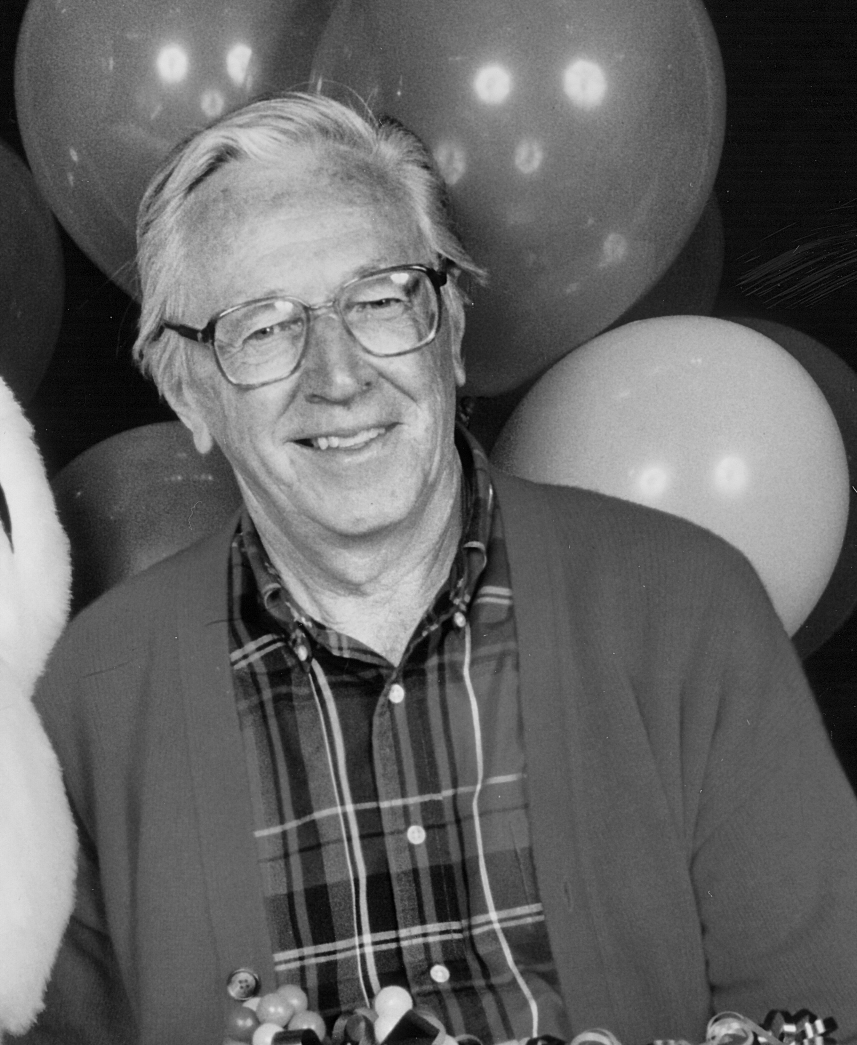
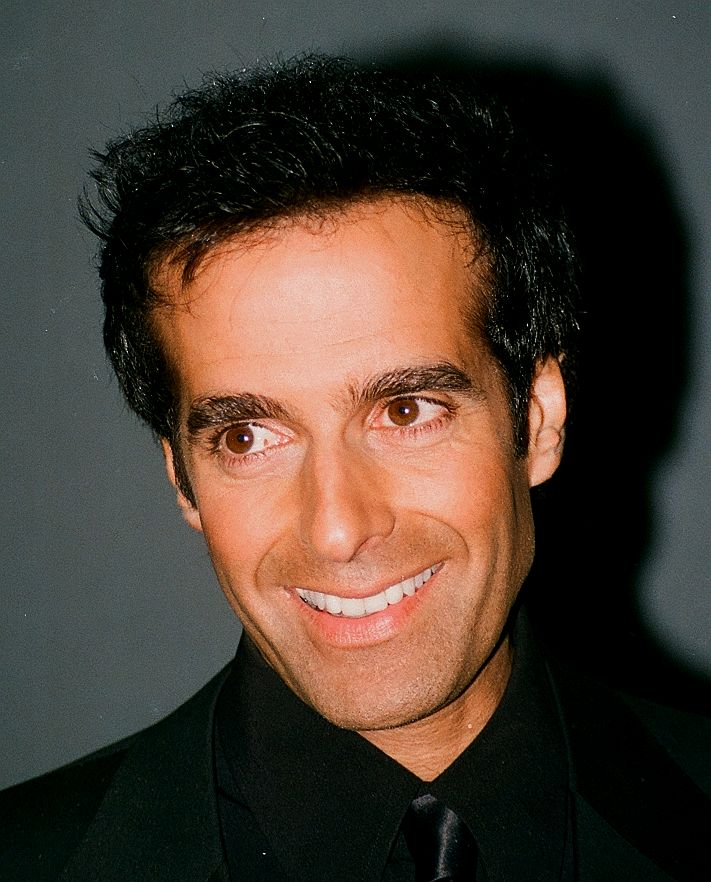
Bill Cosby (8), Charles Schulz (7) and David Copperfield (5) composed the rest of perennials Top 10 entertainers.

1992
No.	Recipient	Career
1	(United States) Bill Cosby	Television personality
2	(United States) Oprah Winfrey	Television personality
3	(United States) Kevin Costner	Actor
4	(United States) New Kids on the Block	Musicians
5	(United States) Steven Spielberg	Filmmaker
6	(United States) Michael Jackson	Musician
7	(United States) Charles Schulz	Cartoonist
8	(United States) Madonna	Musician
9	(Spain) Julio Iglesias	Musician
10	(United States) Guns N' Roses	Musicians

1993
No.	Recipient	Career
1	(United States) Oprah Winfrey	Television personality
2	(United States) Steven Spielberg	Filmmaker
3	(United States) Bill Cosby	Television personality
4	(United States) Guns N' Roses	Musicians
5	(United States) Prince	Musician
6	(United States) Charles Schulz	Cartoonist
7	(United States) Kevin Costner	Actor
8	(Republic of Ireland) U2	Musicians
9	(United States) Garth Brooks	Musician
10	(United States) David Copperfield	Illusionist

1994
No.	Recipient	Career
1	(United States) Steven Spielberg	Filmmaker
2	(United States) Oprah Winfrey	Television personality
3	(United States) Sheryl Leach	Television personality
4	(United Kingdom) Pink Floyd	Musicians
5	(United States) Bill Cosby	Television personality
6	(United States) Barbra Streisand	Musician
7	(United States) Eagles	Musicians
8	(United States) David Copperfield	Illusionist
9	(United Kingdom) The Rolling Stones	Musicians
10	(United States) Harrison Ford	Actor

1995
No.	Recipient	Career
1	(United States) Steven Spielberg	Filmmaker
2	(United States) Oprah Winfrey	Television personality
3	(United Kingdom) The Beatles	Musicians
4	(United Kingdom) The Rolling Stones	Musicians
5	(United States) Eagles	Musicians
6	(United States) David Copperfield	Illusionist
7	(United Kingdom) Pink Floyd	Musicians
8	(United States) Michael Jackson	Musician
9	(United States) Barbra Streisand	Musician
10	(United States) Sylvester Stallone	Actor

1996
No.	Recipient	Career
1	(United States) Oprah Winfrey	Television personality
2	(United States) Steven Spielberg	Filmmaker
3	(United Kingdom) The Beatles	Musicians
4	(United States) Michael Jackson	Musician
5	(United Kingdom) The Rolling Stones	Musicians
6	(United States) Eagles	Musicians
7	(United States) Arnold Schwarzenegger	Actor
8	(United States) David Copperfield	Illusionist
9	(Canada) Jim Carrey	Actor
10	(United States) Michael Crichton	Filmmaker

1997
No.	Recipient	Career
1	(United States) Steven Spielberg	Filmmaker
2	(United States) George Lucas	Filmmaker
3	(United States) Oprah Winfrey	Television personality
4	(United States) Michael Crichton	Filmmaker
5	(United Kingdom) The Beatles	Musicians
6	(United States) Jerry Seinfeld	Television personality
7	(United States) David Copperfield	Illusionist
8	(United States) Stephen King	Author
9	(United States) Tom Cruise	Actor
10	(United States) Arnold Schwarzenegger	Actor

1998
No.	Recipient	Career
1	(United States) Jerry Seinfeld	Television personality
2	(United States) Larry David	Television personality
3	(United States) Steven Spielberg	Filmmaker
4	(United States) Oprah Winfrey	Television personality
5	(Canada) James Cameron	Filmmaker
6	(United States) Tim Allen	Actor
7	(United States) Michael Crichton	Filmmaker
8	(United States) Harrison Ford	Actor
9	(United Kingdom) The Rolling Stones	Musicians
10	(United States) Master P	Musician

== Statistics ==
Most entries by entertainer at the top 10
Entries	Individual	Country of origin	Main profession
12	Steven Spielberg	United States	Filmmaker
10	Oprah Winfrey	United States	Television personality
8	Michael Jackson	United States	Musician
8	Bill Cosby	United States	Television personality
7	The Rolling Stones	United Kingdom	Musicians
7	Charles Schulz	United States	Cartoonist
5	Madonna	United States	Musician
5	David Copperfield	United States	Illusionist

=== Forbes reports and summarize ===
Forbes 20th-century lists were predominantly dominated by male figures. In 1996 alone, only four female celebrities made appearances on the list (Oprah Winfrey ranked 1, Roseanne Barr at 25, Mariah Carey at 33, and Sandra Bullock at 40). Winfrey, however, often appeared even above many individuals regardless of gender, which has been maintained with the inception of Forbes Celebrity 100 in 1999. Various musicians often dominated the list, although high ranks were not usually attained by female artists. Like Winfrey, Madonna was an almost premier exception.

On the other hand, lists were dominated by American personalities rather than foreigners. The Beatles attained the highest ranked for non-Americans. According to Forbes, after list' 11th anniversary, Steven Spielberg and Bill Cosby were the individuals with the most appearances at the top, with three each.

== See also ==
- Forbes Celebrity 100 (1999–2020)
- Forbes Korea Power Celebrity 40
- Forbes list of highest-earning musicians
