= Forbes list of the world's highest-paid dead celebrities =

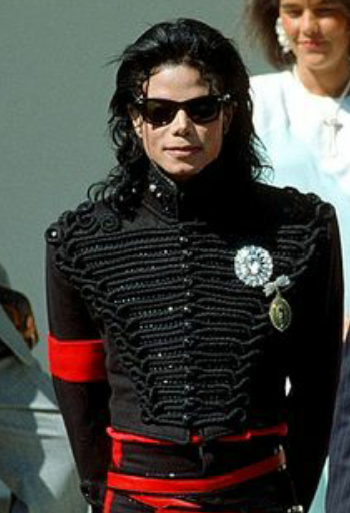
Michael Jackson earned $825 million in 2016, the highest earnings for a celebrity dead or alive in any year. Since his death in mid-2009, he has topped the list every year except for 2009, 2012, 2021–22, and 2026.

This is a list of the world's highest-paid dead celebrities as ranked by Forbes magazine since October 2001.

== Legend ==
Icon	Description
Steady	Has not changed from the previous ranking.
▲	Has increased from the previous ranking.
▼	Has decreased from the previous ranking.

== 2026 list ==
The 2026 list:

Rank	Name	Career	Nation	Year of death	Manner of death	Cause of death	Earnings
1	Quincy Jones	Musician	United States	2024	Natural causes	Cancer	$150 million
▼2	Michael Jackson	Musician	United States	2009	Manslaughter	Overdose	▲$140 million
▼3	Dr. Seuss	Author	United States	1991	Natural causes	Cancer	▼$80 million
▲4	Elvis Presley	Musician	United States	1977	Natural causes	Heart attack	▲$75 million
5	Dolly Parton	Musician	United States	2026	Natural causes	Cancer	$46 million
▲6	Bob Marley	Musician	Jamaica	1981	Natural causes	Cancer	▲$25 million
▲7	Prince	Musician	United States	2016	Accident	Overdose	▲$24 million
8	Diane Keaton	Actress	United States	2025	Natural causes	Pneumonia	$22 million
▲9	John Lennon	Musician	United Kingdom	1980	Homicide	Shooting	▲$18 million
10	George Harrison	Musician	United Kingdom	2001	Natural causes	Cancer	$15 million
▼11	Jimmy Buffett	Musician	United States	2023	Natural causes	Cancer	▲$15 million
▲12	Kobe Bryant	Athlete	United States	2020	Accident	Helicopter crash	▲$14 million
▼13	Arnold Palmer	Athlete	United States	2016	Natural causes	Heart disease	▲$13 million

== 2025 list ==
The 2025 list:

Rank	Name	Career	Nation	Year of death	Manner of death	Cause of death	Earnings
1	Michael Jackson	Musician	United States	2009	Manslaughter	Overdose	▼$105 million
▲2	Dr. Seuss	Author	United States	1991	Natural causes	Cancer	▲$85 million
3	Richard Wright	Musician	United Kingdom	2008	Natural causes	Cancer	$81 million
4	Syd Barrett	Musician	United Kingdom	2006	Natural causes	Cancer	$81 million
5	The Notorious B.I.G.	Musician	United States	1997	Homicide	Shooting	$80 million
6	Miles Davis	Musician	United States	1991	Natural causes	Stroke	$21 million
▼7	Elvis Presley	Musician	United States	1977	Natural causes	Heart attack	▼$17 million
8	Jimmy Buffett	Musician	United States	2023	Natural causes	Cancer	$14 million
▼9	Bob Marley	Musician	Jamaica	1981	Natural causes	Cancer	▼$13 million
10	John Lennon	Musician	United Kingdom	1980	Homicide	Shooting	▼$12 million
▼11	Prince	Musician	United States	2016	Accident	Overdose	▼$11 million
12	Arnold Palmer	Athlete	United States	2016	Natural causes	Heart disease	▼$11 million
13	Kobe Bryant	Athlete	United States	2020	Accident	Helicopter crash	$10 million

== 2024 list ==
The 2024 list:

Rank	Name	Career	Nation	Year of death	Manner of death	Cause of death	Earnings
1	Michael Jackson	Musician	United States	2009	Manslaughter	Overdose	▲$600 million
2	Freddie Mercury	Musician	United Kingdom	1991	Natural causes	Pneumonia resulting from HIV/AIDS	$250 million
▲3	Dr. Seuss	Author	United States	1991	Natural causes	Cancer	▲$75 million
▼4	Elvis Presley	Musician	United States	1977	Natural causes	Heart attack	▼$50 million
5	Ric Ocasek	Musician	United States	2019	Natural causes	Heart disease	$45 million
▼6	Prince	Musician	United States	2016	Accident	Overdose	▲$35 million
▲7	Bob Marley	Musician	Jamaica	1981	Natural causes	Cancer	▲$34 million
▼8	Charles Schulz	Cartoonist	United States	2000	Natural causes	Cancer	$30 million
9	Matthew Perry	Actor	United States/Canada	2023	Accident	Overdose	$18 million
▼10	John Lennon	Musician	United Kingdom	1980	Homicide	Shooting	▼$17 million
11	James Brown	Musician	United States	2006	Natural causes	Heart failure	$15 million
12	Arnold Palmer	Athlete	United States	2016	Natural causes	Heart disease	▲$14 million
▼13	Whitney Houston	Musician	United States	2012	Accident	Drowning	▼$13 million

== 2023 list ==
The 2023 list:

Rank	Name	Career	Nation	Year of death	Manner of death	Cause of death	Earnings
▲1	Michael Jackson	Musician	United States	2009	Manslaughter	Overdose	▲$115 million
▲2	Elvis Presley	Musician	United States	1977	Natural causes	Heart attack	▼$100 million
3	Ray Manzarek	Musician	United States	2013	Natural causes	Cancer	$45 million
▲4	Dr. Seuss	Author	United States	1991	Natural causes	Cancer	▲$40 million
▲5	Charles Schulz	Cartoonist	United States	2000	Natural causes	Cancer	▲$30 million
5	Prince	Musician	United States	2016	Accident	Overdose	$30 million
5	Whitney Houston	Musician	United States	2012	Accident	Drowning	$30 million
▲8	John Lennon	Musician	United Kingdom	1980	Homicide	Shooting	▲$22 million
9	Bob Marley	Musician	Jamaica	1981	Natural causes	Cancer	$16 million
10	Bing Crosby	Musician	United States	1977	Natural causes	Heart attack	$14 million
▲10	George Harrison	Musician	United Kingdom	2001	Natural causes	Cancer	▲$14 million
12	Arnold Palmer	Athlete	United States	2016	Natural causes	Heart disease	$10 million
12	Marilyn Monroe	Actor	United States	1962	Suicide	Overdose	$10 million

== 2022 list ==
The 2022 list:

J.R.R. Tolkien earned $500 million from the sale of Middle-earth Enterprises.

Rank	Name	Career	Nation	Year of death	Manner of death	Cause of death	Earnings
1	J. R. R. Tolkien	Author	United Kingdom	1973	Natural causes	Pneumonia	$500 million
2	Kobe Bryant	Athlete	United States	2020	Accident	Helicopter crash	$400 million
3	David Bowie	Musician	United Kingdom	2016	Natural causes	Cancer	$250 million
▲4	Elvis Presley	Musician	United States	1977	Natural causes	Heart attack	▲$110 million
5	James Brown	Musician	United States	2006	Natural causes	Heart failure	$100 million
▼6	Michael Jackson	Musician	United States	2009	Manslaughter	Overdose	$75 million
7	Leonard Cohen	Musician	Canada	2016	Accident	Fall	$55 million
▼8	Dr. Seuss	Author	United States	1991	Natural causes	Cancer	▼$32 million
9	Jeff Porcaro	Musician	United States	1992	Natural causes	Heart attack	$25 million
▼10	Charles Schulz	Cartoonist	United States	2000	Natural causes	Cancer	▼$24 million
11	Juan Gabriel	Musician	Mexico	2016	Natural causes	Heart attack	$23 million
▲12	John Lennon	Musician	United Kingdom	1980	Homicide	Shooting	▲$16 million
13	George Harrison	Musician	United Kingdom	2001	Natural causes	Cancer	$12 million

== 2021 list ==
The 2021 list:

Netflix announced the acquisition of the Roald Dahl Story Company, which manages the rights to Roald Dahl's stories and characters, for a fee of $684 million (£500m). Dahl's heirs held at least a 75% stake before the company was acquired.

Rank	Name	Career	Nation	Year of death	Manner of death	Cause of death	Earnings
1	Roald Dahl	Author	United Kingdom	1990	Natural causes	Cancer	$513 million
▲2	Prince	Musician	United States	2016	Accident	Overdose	▲$120 million
▼3	Michael Jackson	Musician	United States	2009	Manslaughter	Overdose	▲$75 million
▼4	Charles Schulz	Cartoonist	United States	2000	Natural causes	Cancer	▲$40 million
▼5	Dr. Seuss	Author	United States	1991	Natural causes	Cancer	▲$35 million
6	Bing Crosby	Musician	United States	1977	Natural causes	Heart attack	$33 million
▼7	Elvis Presley	Musician	United States	1977	Natural causes	Heart attack	▲$30 million
▼8	Arnold Palmer	Athlete	United States	2016	Natural causes	Heart disease	▲$27 million
9	Gerry Goffin	Lyricist	United States	2014	Natural causes	Unspecified	$23 million
10	Luther Vandross	Musician	United States	2005	Natural causes	Stroke	$21 million
▼11	Bob Marley	Musician	Jamaica	1981	Natural causes	Cancer	▲$16 million
▼12	Juice Wrld	Musician	United States	2019	Accident	Overdose	$15 million
▼13	John Lennon	Musician	United Kingdom	1980	Homicide	Shooting	▼$12 million

== 2020 list ==
The 2020 list:

Rank	Name	Career	Nation	Year of death	Manner of death	Cause of death	Earnings
1	Michael Jackson	Musician	United States	2009	Manslaughter	Overdose	▼$48 million
▲2	Dr. Seuss	Author	United States	1991	Natural causes	Cancer	▲$33 million
3	Charles Schulz	Cartoonist	United States	2000	Natural causes	Cancer	▼$32.5 million
4	Arnold Palmer	Athlete	United States	2016	Natural causes	Heart disease	▼$25 million
▼5	Elvis Presley	Musician	United States	1977	Natural causes	Heart attack	▼$23 million
6	Kobe Bryant	Athlete	United States	2020	Accident	Helicopter crash	$20 million
7	Juice Wrld	Musician	United States	2019	Accident	Overdose	$15 million
▼8	Bob Marley	Musician	Jamaica	1981	Natural causes	Cancer	▼$14 million
▼9	John Lennon	Musician	United Kingdom	1980	Homicide	Shooting	▼$13 million
▼10	Prince	Musician	United States	2016	Accident	Overdose	▼$10 million
11	Freddie Mercury	Musician	United Kingdom	1991	Natural causes	Pneumonia resulting from HIV/AIDS	$9 million
▲12	George Harrison	Musician	United Kingdom	2001	Natural causes	Cancer	▼$8.5 million
▼13	Marilyn Monroe	Actor	United States	1962	Suicide	Overdose	▼$8 million

== 2019 list ==
The 2019 list:

Rank	Name	Career	Nation	Year of death	Manner of death	Cause of death	Earnings
1	Michael Jackson	Musician	United States	2009	Manslaughter	Overdose	▼$60 million
2	Elvis Presley	Musician	United States	1977	Natural causes	Heart attack	▼$39 million
▲3	Charles Schulz	Cartoonist	United States	2000	Natural causes	Cancer	▲$38 million
▼4	Arnold Palmer	Athlete	United States	2016	Natural causes	Heart disease	▼$30 million
5	Bob Marley	Musician	Jamaica	1981	Natural causes	Cancer	▼$20 million
6	Dr. Seuss	Author	United States	1991	Natural causes	Cancer	▲$19 million
▲7	John Lennon	Musician	United Kingdom	1980	Homicide	Shooting	▲$14 million
8	Marilyn Monroe	Actor	United States	1962	Suicide	Overdose	▼$13 million
9	Prince	Musician	United States	2016	Accident	Overdose	▼$12 million
10	Nipsey Hussle	Musician	United States	2019	Homicide	Shooting	$11 million
11	XXXTentacion	Musician	United States	2018	Homicide	Shooting	▼$10 million
12	Whitney Houston	Musician	United States	2012	Accident	Drowning	$9.5 million
13	George Harrison	Musician	United Kingdom	2001	Natural causes	Cancer	$9 million

== 2018 list ==
The 2018 list:

Michael Jackson brought in $287 million from the sale of his estate's stake in Sony/ATV Music Publishing to Sony.

Rank	Name	Career	Nation	Year of death	Manner of death	Cause of death	Earnings
1	Michael Jackson	Musician	United States	2009	Manslaughter	Overdose	▲$400 million
▲2	Elvis Presley	Musician	United States	1977	Natural causes	Heart attack	▲$40 million
▼3	Arnold Palmer	Athlete	United States	2016	Natural causes	Heart disease	▼$35 million
▼4	Charles Schulz	Cartoonist	United States	2000	Natural causes	Cancer	▼$34 million
5	Bob Marley	Musician	Jamaica	1981	Natural causes	Cancer	$23 million
▲6	Dr. Seuss	Author	United States	1991	Natural causes	Cancer	$16 million
7	Hugh Hefner	Personality	United States	2017	Natural causes	Sepsis	$15 million
8	Marilyn Monroe	Actor	United States	1962	Suicide	Overdose	$14 million
▼9	Prince	Musician	United States	2016	Accident	Overdose	▼$13 million
▼10	John Lennon	Musician	United Kingdom	1980	Homicide	Shooting	$12 million
11	XXXTentacion	Musician	United States	2018	Homicide	Shooting	$11 million
12	Muhammad Ali	Athlete	United States	2016	Natural causes	Septic shock	$8 million
13	Bettie Page	Model	United States	2008	Natural causes	Heart attack	▼$7 million

== 2017 list ==
The 2017 list:

Rank	Name	Career	Nation	Year of death	Manner of death	Cause of death	Earnings
1	Michael Jackson	Musician	United States	2009	Manslaughter	Overdose	▼$75 million
▲2	Arnold Palmer	Athlete	United States	2016	Natural causes	Heart disease	$40 million
▼3	Charles Schulz	Cartoonist	United States	2000	Natural causes	Cancer	▼$38 million
4	Elvis Presley	Musician	United States	1977	Natural causes	Heart attack	▲$35 million
▲5	Bob Marley	Musician	Jamaica	1981	Natural causes	Cancer	▲$23 million
6	Tom Petty	Musician	United States	2017	Accident	Overdose	$20 million
▼7	Prince	Musician	United States	2016	Accident	Overdose	▼$18 million
▼8	Dr. Seuss	Author	United States	1991	Natural causes	Cancer	▼$16 million
▼9	John Lennon	Musician	United Kingdom	1980	Homicide	Shooting	$12 million
▼10	Albert Einstein	Scientist	Germany	1955	Natural causes	Aneurysm	▼$10 million
11	David Bowie	Musician	United Kingdom	2016	Natural causes	Cancer	▼$9.5 million
▲12	Elizabeth Taylor	Actor	United Kingdom	2011	Natural causes	Heart failure	$8 million
▼13	Bettie Page	Model	United States	2008	Natural causes	Heart attack	▼$7.5 million

== 2016 list ==
The 2016 list:

Michael Jackson had the largest annual gain for an entertainer, living or dead, due to the $750 million sale of his half of the Sony/ATV Music Publishing catalogue.

Rank	Name	Career	Nation	Year of death	Manner of death	Cause of death	Earnings
1	Michael Jackson	Musician	United States	2009	Manslaughter	Overdose	▲$825 million
▲2	Charles Schulz	Cartoonist	United States	2000	Natural causes	Cancer	▲$48 million
3	Arnold Palmer	Athlete	United States	2016	Natural causes	Heart disease	$40 million
▼4	Elvis Presley	Musician	United States	1977	Natural causes	Heart attack	$27 million
5	Prince	Musician	United States	2016	Accident	Overdose	$25 million
▼6	Bob Marley	Musician	Jamaica	1981	Natural causes	Cancer	$21 million
▲7	Dr. Seuss	Author	United States	1991	Natural causes	Cancer	▲$20 million
▼8	John Lennon	Musician	United Kingdom	1980	Homicide	Shooting	$12 million
▼9	Albert Einstein	Scientist	Germany	1955	Natural causes	Aneurysm	▲$11.5 million
▼10	Bettie Page	Model	United States	2008	Natural causes	Heart attack	▲$11 million
11	David Bowie	Musician	United Kingdom	2016	Natural causes	Cancer	$10.5 million
▼12	Steve McQueen	Actor	United States	1980	Natural causes	Heart attack	$9 million
▼13	Elizabeth Taylor	Actor	United Kingdom	2011	Natural causes	Heart failure	▼$8 million

== 2015 list ==
The 2015 list:

Rank	Name	Career	Nation	Year of death	Manner of death	Cause of death	Earnings
1	Michael Jackson	Musician	United States	2009	Manslaughter	Overdose	▼$115 million
2	Elvis Presley	Musician	United States	1977	Natural causes	Heart attack	$55 million
3	Charles Schulz	Cartoonist	United States	2000	Natural causes	Cancer	$40 million
4	Bob Marley	Musician	Jamaica	1981	Natural causes	Cancer	$21 million
▼5	Elizabeth Taylor	Actor	United Kingdom	2011	Natural causes	Heart failure	▼$20 million
6	Marilyn Monroe	Actor	United States	1962	Suicide	Overdose	$17 million
7	John Lennon	Musician	United Kingdom	1980	Homicide	Shooting	$12 million
8	Albert Einstein	Scientist	Germany	1955	Natural causes	Aneurysm	$11 million
9	Bettie Page	Model	United States	2008	Natural causes	Heart attack	▲$10 million
▼10	Dr. Seuss	Author	United States	1991	Natural causes	Cancer	▲$9.5 million
▼11	Steve McQueen	Actor	United States	1980	Natural causes	Heart attack	$9 million
▼12	Paul Walker	Actor	United States	2013	Accident	Car crash	▼$8.5 million
▲12	James Dean	Actor	United States	1955	Accident	Car crash	▲$8.5 million

== 2014 list ==
The 2014 list:

Rank	Name	Career	Nation	Year of death	Manner of death	Cause of death	Earnings
1	Michael Jackson	Musician	United States	2009	Manslaughter	Overdose	▼$140 million
2	Elvis Presley	Musician	United States	1977	Natural causes	Heart attack	$55 million
3	Charles Schulz	Cartoonist	United States	2000	Natural causes	Cancer	▲$40 million
4	Elizabeth Taylor	Actor	United Kingdom	2011	Natural causes	Heart failure	$25 million
4	Paul Walker	Actor	United States	2013	Accident	Car crash	$25 million
6	Marilyn Monroe	Actor	United States	1962	Suicide	Overdose	▲$17 million
7	John Lennon	Musician	United Kingdom	1980	Homicide	Shooting	$12 million
8	Albert Einstein	Scientist	Germany	1955	Natural causes	Aneurysm	▲$11 million
▲9	Dr. Seuss	Author	United States	1991	Natural causes	Cancer	$9 million
▲9	Bruce Lee	Actor	Hong Kong/United States	1973	Accident	Cerebral edema	▲$9 million
▲9	Steve McQueen	Actor	United States	1980	Natural causes	Cancer	$9 million
▼9	Bettie Page	Model	United States	2008	Natural causes	Heart attack	▼$9 million
13	James Dean	Actor	United States	1955	Accident	Car crash	$7 million

== 2013 list ==
The 2013 list:

Rank	Name	Career	Nation	Year of death	Manner of death	Cause of death	Earnings
▲1	Michael Jackson	Musician	United States	2009	Manslaughter	Overdose	▲$160 million
▲2	Elvis Presley	Musician	United States	1977	Natural causes	Heart attack	$55 million
▲3	Charles Schulz	Cartoonist	United States	2000	Natural causes	Cancer	$37 million
▼4	Elizabeth Taylor	Actor	United Kingdom	2011	Natural causes	Heart failure	▼$25 million
5	Bob Marley	Musician	Jamaica	1981	Natural causes	Cancer	$17 million
▲6	Marilyn Monroe	Actor	United States	1962	Suicide	Overdose	▲$15 million
▼7	John Lennon	Musician	United Kingdom	1980	Homicide	Shooting	$12 million
▼8	Albert Einstein	Scientist	Germany	1955	Natural causes	Aneurysm	$10 million
▲8	Bettie Page	Model	United States	2008	Natural causes	Heart attack	▲$10 million
▼10	Dr. Seuss	Author	United States	1991	Natural causes	Cancer	$9 million
10	Steve McQueen	Actor	United States	1980	Natural causes	Heart attack	▲$9 million
12	Bruce Lee	Actor	Hong Kong/United States	1973	Accident	Cerebral edema	$7 million

== 2012 list ==
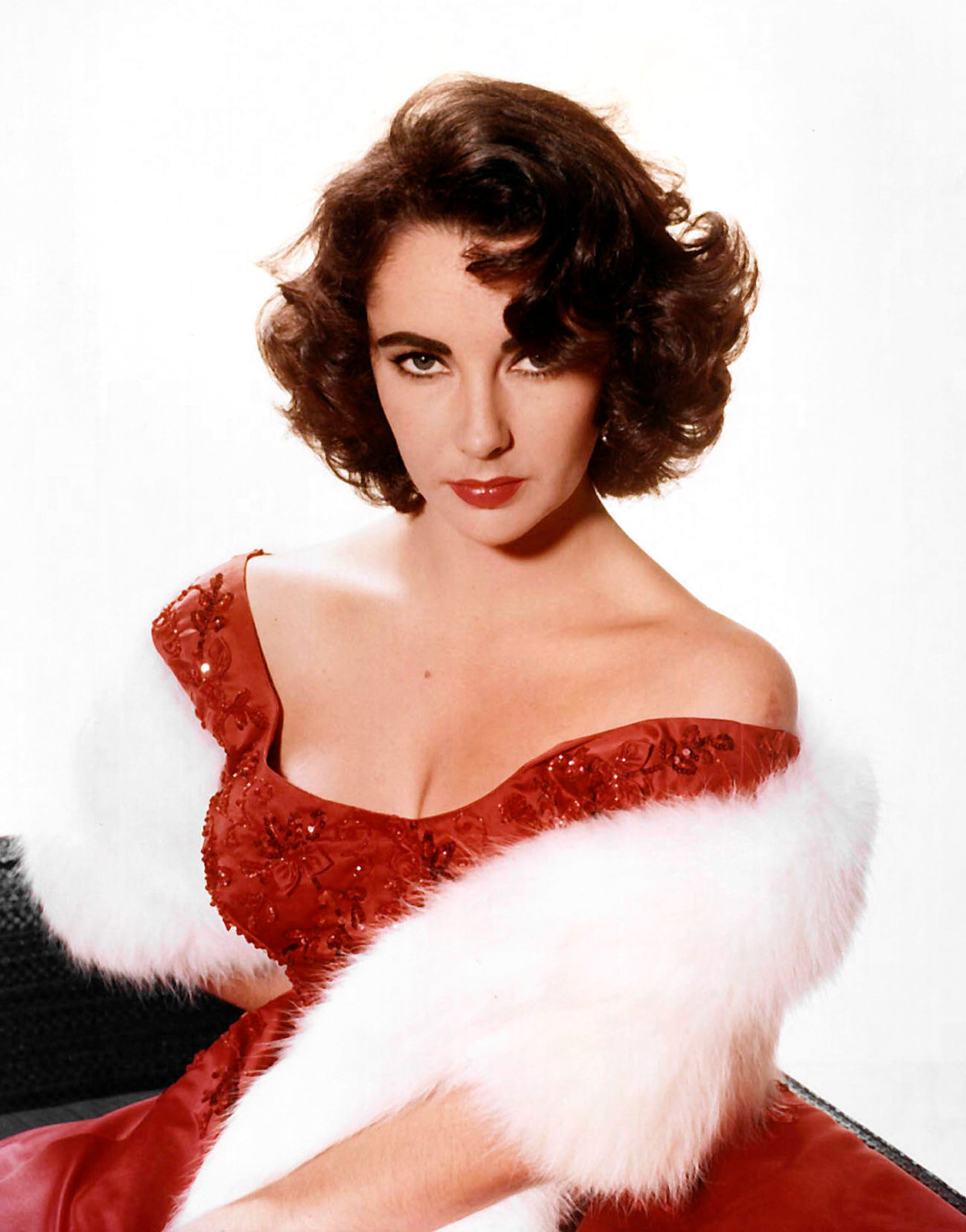
Elizabeth Taylor earned $219 million in 2012.

The 2012 list:

Rank	Name	Career	Nation	Year of death	Manner of death	Cause of death	Earnings
▲1	Elizabeth Taylor	Actor	United Kingdom	2011	Natural causes	Heart failure	▲$210 million
▼2	Michael Jackson	Musician	United States	2009	Manslaughter	Overdose	▼$145 million
▼3	Elvis Presley	Musician	United States	1977	Natural causes	Heart attack	$55 million
4	Charles Schulz	Cartoonist	United States	2000	Natural causes	Cancer	▲$37 million
5	Bob Marley	Musician	Jamaica	1981	Natural causes	Cancer	$17 million
▼6	John Lennon	Musician	United Kingdom	1980	Homicide	Shooting	$12 million
▼7	Marilyn Monroe	Actor	United States	1962	Suicide	Overdose	▼$10 million
7	Albert Einstein	Scientist	Germany	1955	Natural causes	Aneurysm	$10 million
▼9	Dr. Seuss	Author	United States	1991	Natural causes	Cancer	$9 million
▼10	Steve McQueen	Actor	United States	1980	Natural causes	Heart attack	▲$8 million
▲10	Bettie Page	Model	United States	2008	Natural causes	Heart attack	▲$8 million
▼12	Richard Rodgers	Composer	United States	1979	Natural causes	Cancer	▼$6 million
13	George Harrison	Musician	United Kingdom	2001	Natural causes	Cancer	▼$5.5 million

== 2011 list ==
The 2011 list:

Rank	Name	Career	Nation	Year of death	Manner of death	Cause of death	Earnings
1	Michael Jackson	Musician	United States	2009	Manslaughter	Overdose	▼$170 million
2	Elvis Presley	Musician	United States	1977	Natural causes	Heart attack	▼$55 million
3	Marilyn Monroe	Actor	United States	1962	Suicide	Overdose	$27 million
4	Charles Schulz	Cartoonist	United States	2000	Natural causes	Cancer	▼$25 million
5	John Lennon	Musician	United Kingdom	1980	Homicide	Shooting	▼$12 million
5	Elizabeth Taylor	Actor	United Kingdom	2011	Natural causes	Heart failure	$12 million
▲7	Albert Einstein	Scientist	Germany	1955	Natural causes	Aneurysm	$10 million
▼8	Dr. Seuss	Author	United States	1991	Natural causes	Cancer	▼$9 million
▲9	Jimi Hendrix	Musician	United States	1970	Accident	Overdose	▲$7 million
▼9	Stieg Larsson	Author	Sweden	2004	Natural causes	Heart attack	▼$7 million
▲9	Steve McQueen	Actor	United States	1980	Natural causes	Heart attack	▲$7 million
▲9	Richard Rodgers	Composer	United States	1979	Natural causes	Cancer	$7 million
13	George Harrison	Musician	United Kingdom	2001	Natural causes	Cancer	$6 million
13	Bettie Page	Model	United States	2008	Natural causes	Heart attack	$6 million
13	Andy Warhol	Artist	United States	1987	Natural causes	Arrhythmia	$6 million

== 2010 list ==
The 2010 list:

Rank	Name	Career	Nation	Year of death	Manner of death	Cause of death	Earnings
▲1	Michael Jackson	Musician	United States	2009	Manslaughter	Overdose	▲$275 million
▲2	Elvis Presley	Musician	United States	1977	Natural causes	Heart attack	▲$60 million
▲3	J. R. R. Tolkien	Author	United Kingdom	1973	Natural causes	Pneumonia	$50 million
▲4	Charles Schulz	Cartoonist	United States	2000	Natural causes	Cancer	▼$33 million
▲5	John Lennon	Musician	United Kingdom	1980	Homicide	Shooting	▲$17 million
6	Stieg Larsson	Author	Sweden	2004	Natural causes	Heart attack	$15 million
7	Dr. Seuss	Author	United States	1991	Natural causes	Cancer	▼$11 million
▲8	Albert Einstein	Scientist	Germany	1955	Natural causes	Aneurysm	$10 million
9	George Steinbrenner	Businessperson	United States	2010	Natural causes	Heart attack	$8 million
▼10	Richard Rodgers	Composer	United States	1979	Natural causes	Cancer	▼$7 million
11	Jimi Hendrix	Musician	United States	1970	Accident	Overdose	▼$6 million
11	Steve McQueen	Actor	United States	1980	Natural causes	Heart attack	$6 million
▼13	Aaron Spelling	Film producer	United States	2006	Natural causes	Stroke	▼$5 million

== 2009 list ==
The 2009 list:

Rank	Name	Career	Nation	Year of death	Manner of death	Cause of death	Earnings
1	Yves Saint Laurent	Fashion designer	France	2008	Natural causes	Cancer	$350 million
2	Richard Rodgers	Composer	United States	1979	Natural causes	Cancer	$235 million
2	Oscar Hammerstein	Lyricist	United States	1960	Natural causes	Cancer	$235 million
3	Michael Jackson	Musician	United States	2009	Manslaughter	Overdose	$90 million
▼4	Elvis Presley	Musician	United States	1977	Natural causes	Heart attack	▲$55 million
5	J. R. R. Tolkien	Author	United Kingdom	1973	Natural causes	Pneumonia	$50 million
▼6	Charles Schulz	Cartoonist	United States	2000	Natural causes	Cancer	$35 million
7	John Lennon	Musician	United Kingdom	1980	Homicide	Shooting	▲$15 million
▼7	Dr. Seuss	Author	United States	1991	Natural causes	Cancer	▲$15 million
▼9	Albert Einstein	Scientist	Germany	1955	Natural causes	Aneurysm	▼$10 million
10	Michael Crichton	Author	United States	2008	Natural causes	Cancer	$9 million
11	Jimi Hendrix	Musician	United States	1970	Accident	Overdose	$8 million
▼11	Aaron Spelling	Film producer	United States	2006	Natural causes	Stroke	▼$8 million
▼13	Andy Warhol	Artist	United States	1987	Natural causes	Arrhythmia	▼$6 million

== 2008 list ==
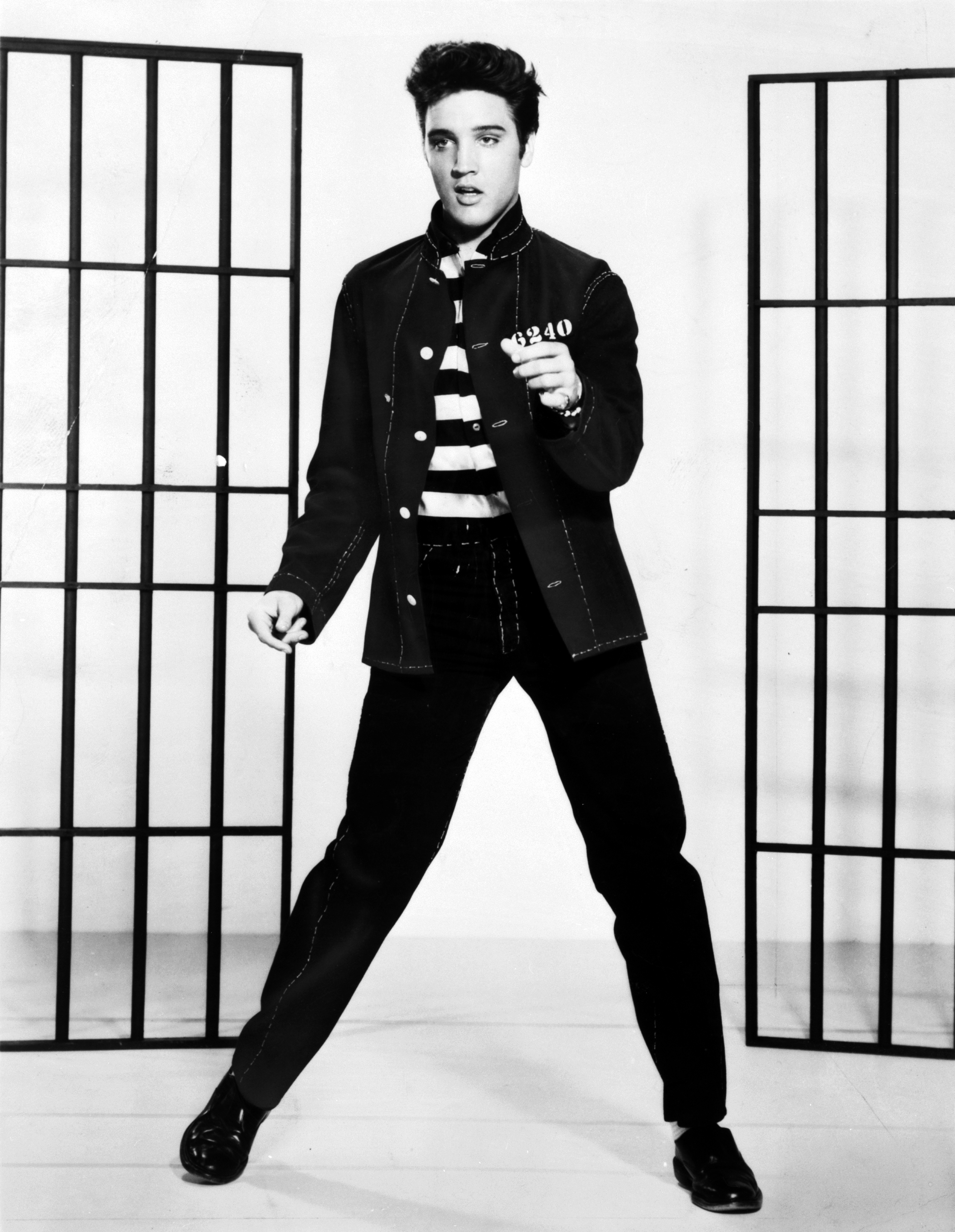
Elvis Presley earned $52 million in 2008.

The 2008 list:

Rank	Name	Career	Nation	Year of death	Manner of death	Cause of death	Earnings
1	Elvis Presley	Musician	United States	1977	Natural causes	Heart attack	▲$52 million
▲2	Charles Schulz	Cartoonist	United States	2000	Natural causes	Cancer	▼$33 million
3	Heath Ledger	Actor	Australia	2008	Accident	Overdose	$20 million
▲4	Albert Einstein	Scientist	Germany	1955	Natural causes	Aneurysm	$18 million
5	Aaron Spelling	Film producer	United States	2006	Natural causes	Stroke	$15 million
▲6	Dr. Seuss	Author	United States	1991	Natural causes	Cancer	▼$12 million
▼7	John Lennon	Musician	United Kingdom	1980	Homicide	Shooting	▼$9 million
▼7	Andy Warhol	Artist	United States	1987	Natural causes	Arrhythmia	▼$9 million
9	Marilyn Monroe	Actor	United States	1962	Suicide	Overdose	▼$6.5 million
10	Steve McQueen	Actor	United States	1980	Natural causes	Heart attack	$6 million
11	Paul Newman	Actor	United States	2008	Natural causes	Cancer	$5 million
▲11	James Dean	Actor	United States	1955	Accident	Car crash	▲$5 million
13	Marvin Gaye	Musician	United States	1984	Homicide	Shooting	$3.5 million

== 2007 list ==
The 2007 list:

Rank	Name	Career	Nation	Year of death	Manner of death	Cause of death	Earnings
▲1	Elvis Presley	Musician	United States	1977	Natural causes	Heart attack	▲$49 million
▲2	John Lennon	Musician	United Kingdom	1980	Homicide	Shooting	▲$44 million
3	Charles Schulz	Cartoonist	United States	2000	Natural causes	Cancer	$35 million
▲4	George Harrison	Musician	United Kingdom	2001	Natural causes	Cancer	▲$22 million
5	Albert Einstein	Scientist	Germany	1955	Natural causes	Aneurysm	▼$18 million
6	Andy Warhol	Artist	United States	1987	Natural causes	Arrhythmia	▼$15 million
7	Dr. Seuss	Author	United States	1991	Natural causes	Cancer	▲$13 million
8	Tupac Shakur	Musician	United States	1996	Homicide	Shooting	$9 million
9	Marilyn Monroe	Actor	United States	1962	Suicide	Overdose	▼$7 million
10	Steve McQueen	Actor	United States	1980	Natural causes	Heart attack	$6 million
11	James Brown	Musician	United States	2006	Natural causes	Heart failure	$5 million
▼12	Bob Marley	Musician	Jamaica	1981	Natural causes	Cancer	▼$4 million
13	James Dean	Actor	United States	1955	Accident	Car crash	$3.5 million

== 2006 list ==
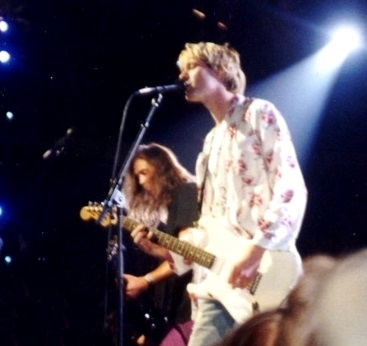
Kurt Cobain earned $50 million in 2006, after the sale of the Nirvana song catalogue.

The 2006 list:

Rank	Name	Career	Nation	Year of death	Manner of death	Cause of death	Earnings
1	Kurt Cobain	Musician	United States	1994	Suicide	Shooting	$50 million
▼2	Elvis Presley	Musician	United States	1977	Natural causes	Heart attack	▼$42 million
▼3	Charles Schulz	Cartoonist	United States	2000	Natural causes	Cancer	$35 million
▼4	John Lennon	Musician	United Kingdom	1980	Homicide	Shooting	▲$24 million
5	Albert Einstein	Scientist	Germany	1955	Natural causes	Aneurysm	$20 million
▼6	Andy Warhol	Artist	United States	1987	Natural causes	Arrhythmia	▲$19 million
▼7	Dr. Seuss	Author	United States	1991	Natural causes	Cancer	$10 million
▲7	Ray Charles	Musician	United States	2004	Natural causes	Liver failure	▲$10 million
▼9	Marilyn Monroe	Actor	United States	1962	Suicide	Overdose	$8 million
9	Johnny Cash	Musician	United States	2003	Natural causes	Diabetes	▲$8 million
▼11	J. R. R. Tolkien	Author	United Kingdom	1973	Natural causes	Pneumonia	▼$7 million
▼11	George Harrison	Musician	United Kingdom	2001	Natural causes	Cancer	$7 million
▲11	Bob Marley	Musician	Jamaica	1981	Natural causes	Cancer	▲$7 million

== 2005 list ==
The 2005 list:

Rank	Name	Career	Nation	Year of death	Manner of death	Cause of death	Earnings
1	Elvis Presley	Musician	United States	1977	Natural causes	Heart attack	▲$45 million
2	Charles Schulz	Cartoonist	United States	2000	Natural causes	Cancer	$35 million
▲3	John Lennon	Musician	United Kingdom	1980	Homicide	Shooting	▲$22 million
4	Andy Warhol	Artist	United States	1987	Natural causes	Arrhythmia	$16 million
5	Dr. Seuss	Author	United States	1991	Natural causes	Cancer	▼$10 million
6	Marlon Brando	Actor	United States	2004	Natural causes	Respiratory failure	$9 million
▼7	Marilyn Monroe	Actor	United States	1962	Suicide	Overdose	$8 million
▼7	J. R. R. Tolkien	Author	United Kingdom	1973	Natural causes	Pneumonia	▼$8 million
▼9	George Harrison	Musician	United Kingdom	2001	Natural causes	Cancer	$7 million
9	Johnny Cash	Musician	United States	2003	Natural causes	Diabetes	$7 million
▼9	Irving Berlin	Composer	United States	1989	Natural causes	Heart attack	$7 million
▼12	Bob Marley	Musician	Jamaica	1981	Natural causes	Cancer	▼$6 million
12	Ray Charles	Musician	United States	2004	Natural causes	Liver failure	$6 million

== 2004 list ==
The 2004 list:

Rank	Name	Career	Nation	Year of death	Manner of death	Cause of death	Earnings
1	Elvis Presley	Musician	United States	1977	Natural causes	Heart attack	$40 million
2	Charles Schulz	Cartoonist	United States	2000	Natural causes	Cancer	▲$35 million
3	J. R. R. Tolkien	Author	United Kingdom	1973	Natural causes	Pneumonia	▲$23 million
4	John Lennon	Musician	United Kingdom	1980	Homicide	Shooting	▲$21 million
▲5	Dr. Seuss	Author	United States	1991	Natural causes	Cancer	▲$18 million
▲6	Marilyn Monroe	Actor	United States	1962	Suicide	Overdose	$8 million
▼7	George Harrison	Musician	United Kingdom	2001	Natural causes	Cancer	▼$7 million
▲7	Irving Berlin	Composer	United States	1989	Natural causes	Heart attack	▲$7 million
▲7	Bob Marley	Musician	Jamaica	1981	Natural causes	Cancer	▼$7 million
▲10	Richard Rodgers	Composer	United States	1979	Natural causes	Cancer	▼$6.5 million
11	George Gershwin	Composer	United States	1937	Natural causes	Cancer	$6 million
11	Ira Gershwin	Lyricist	United States	1983	Natural causes	Heart disease	$6 million
▲11	Jimi Hendrix	Musician	United States	1970	Accident	Overdose	▼$6 million
11	Alan Jay Lerner	Lyricist	United States	1986	Natural causes	Cancer	$6 million
11	Frederick Loewe	Composer	United States	1988	Natural causes	Heart attack	$6 million
▲11	Cole Porter	Composer	United States	1964	Natural causes	Kidney failure	$6 million
▲17	James Dean	Actor	United States	1955	Accident	Car crash	$5 million
▼17	Dale Earnhardt	Athlete	United States	2001	Accident	Car crash	▼$5 million
▲17	Jerry Garcia	Musician	United States	1995	Natural causes	Heart attack	$5 million
17	Freddie Mercury	Musician	United Kingdom	1991	Natural causes	Pneumonia resulting from HIV/AIDS	$5 million
▼17	Tupac Shakur	Musician	United States	1996	Homicide	Shooting	▼$5 million
▼17	Frank Sinatra	Musician	United States	1998	Natural causes	Heart attack	▼$5 million

== 2003 list ==
The 2003 list:

Rank	Name	Career	Nation	Year of death	Manner of death	Cause of death	Earnings
1	Elvis Presley	Musician	United States	1977	Natural causes	Heart attack	▲$40 million
2	Charles Schulz	Cartoonist	United States	2000	Natural causes	Cancer	▲$32 million
▲3	J. R. R. Tolkien	Author	United Kingdom	1973	Natural causes	Pneumonia	▲$22 million
▼4	John Lennon	Musician	United Kingdom	1980	Homicide	Shooting	▼$19 million
▲5	George Harrison	Musician	United Kingdom	2001	Natural causes	Cancer	▼$16 million
▼6	Dr. Seuss	Author	United States	1991	Natural causes	Cancer	▼$16 million
▼7	Dale Earnhardt	Athlete	United States	2001	Accident	Car crash	▼$15 million
▲8	Tupac Shakur	Musician	United States	1996	Homicide	Shooting	$12 million
▼9	Bob Marley	Musician	Jamaica	1981	Natural causes	Cancer	▼$9 million
10	Marilyn Monroe	Actor	United States	1962	Suicide	Overdose	▲$8 million
11	Frank Sinatra	Musician	United States	1998	Natural causes	Heart attack	$7 million
12	Richard Rodgers	Composer	United States	1979	Natural causes	Cancer	$7 million
13	Oscar Hammerstein	Songwriter	United States	1960	Natural causes	Cancer	$7 million
▼14	Jimi Hendrix	Musician	United States	1970	Accident	Overdose	▼$7 million
15	Cole Porter	Composer	United States	1964	Natural causes	Kidney failure	$6 million
16	Irving Berlin	Composer	United States	1989	Natural causes	Heart attack	$6 million
17	Robert Atkins	Doctor	United Kingdom	2003	Accident	Head trauma	$6 million
18	James Dean	Actor	United States	1955	Accident	Car crash	$5 million
▼19	Jerry Garcia	Musician	United States	1995	Natural causes	Heart attack	$5 million

== 2002 list ==
The 2002 list:

Rank	Name	Career	Nation	Year of death	Manner of death	Cause of death	Earnings
1	Elvis Presley	Musician	United States	1977	Natural causes	Heart attack	▲$37 million
2	Charles Schulz	Cartoonist	United States	2000	Natural causes	Cancer	▲$28 million
▼3	John Lennon	Musician	United Kingdom	1980	Homicide	Shooting	$20 million
3	Dale Earnhardt	Athlete	United States	2001	Accident	Car crash	$20 million
▼5	Dr. Seuss	Author	United States	1991	Natural causes	Cancer	▲$19 million
6	George Harrison	Musician	United Kingdom	2001	Natural causes	Cancer	$17 million
▲7	J. R. R. Tolkien	Author	United Kingdom	1973	Natural causes	Pneumonia	▲$12 million
▼8	Bob Marley	Musician	Jamaica	1981	Natural causes	Cancer	$10 million
▼9	Jimi Hendrix	Musician	United States	1970	Accident	Overdose	▼$8 million
10	Tupac Shakur	Musician	United States	1996	Homicide	Shooting	$7 million
▲10	Marilyn Monroe	Actor	United States	1962	Suicide	Overdose	▲$7 million
▼12	Jerry Garcia	Musician	United States	1995	Natural causes	Heart attack	$5 million
12	Robert Ludlum	Author	United States	2001	Natural causes	Heart attack	$5 million

== 2001 list ==
The 2001 list:

Rank	Name	Career	Nation	Year of death	Manner of death	Cause of death	Earnings
1	Elvis Presley	Musician	United States	1977	Natural causes	Heart attack	$35 million
2	Charles Schulz	Cartoonist	United States	2000	Natural causes	Cancer	$20 million
2	John Lennon	Musician	United Kingdom	1980	Homicide	Shooting	$20 million
4	Dr. Seuss	Author	United States	1991	Natural causes	Cancer	$17 million
5	Jimi Hendrix	Musician	United States	1970	Accident	Overdose	$10 million
5	Bob Marley	Musician	Jamaica	1981	Natural causes	Cancer	$10 million
7	Andy Warhol	Artist	United States	1987	Natural causes	Arrhythmia	$8 million
8	J. R. R. Tolkien	Author	United Kingdom	1973	Natural causes	Pneumonia	$7 million
9	Frank Sinatra	Musician	United States	1998	Natural causes	Heart attack	$6 million
10	Jerry Garcia	Musician	United States	1995	Natural causes	Heart attack	$5 million
11	Keith Haring	Artist	United States	1990	Natural causes	Complications from HIV/AIDS	$4 million
11	Marilyn Monroe	Actor	United States	1962	Suicide	Overdose	$4 million
13	James Dean	Actor	United States	1955	Accident	Car crash	$3 million
