= Huajing S =

Plug-in hybrid full-size crossover SUV

Overview
- Manufacturer: Huajing
- Also called: Wuling Eletto S (export)
- Production: 2026–present
- Assembly: China: Liuzhou, Guangxi

Body and chassis
- Class: Full-size crossover SUV (F)
- Body style: 5-door SUV
- Layout: Front-engine, front-motor, front-wheel-drive; Front-engine, dual-motor, all-wheel drive
- Platform: Tianyu L Architecture

Powertrain
- Engine: Petrol plug-in hybrid: 1.5 L LBT turbo I4
- Electric motor: Permanent magnet synchronous
- Transmission: 1-speed DHT
- Hybrid drivetrain: Series-parallel plug-in hybrid
- Battery: 31 kWh Magic LFP Rept Battero; 41.9 kWh Magic LFP CATL
- Range: Up to 1,145 km (711 mi) (WLTP)
- Electric range: 130–175 km (81–109 mi) (WLTC); 200–255 km (124–158 mi) (CLTC)

Dimensions
- Wheelbase: 3,105 mm (122.2 in)
- Length: 5,235 mm (206.1 in)
- Width: 1,999 mm (78.7 in)
- Height: 1,800 mm (70.9 in)
- Curb weight: 2,385–2,665 kg (5,258–5,875 lb)

The Huajing S (Chinese: 华境S) is a plug-in hybrid full-size crossover SUV produced by SAIC-GM-Wuling and sold under the Huajing marque. It is the first vehicle codeveloped by SAIC-GM-Wuling and Huawei Qiankun.

== Overview ==
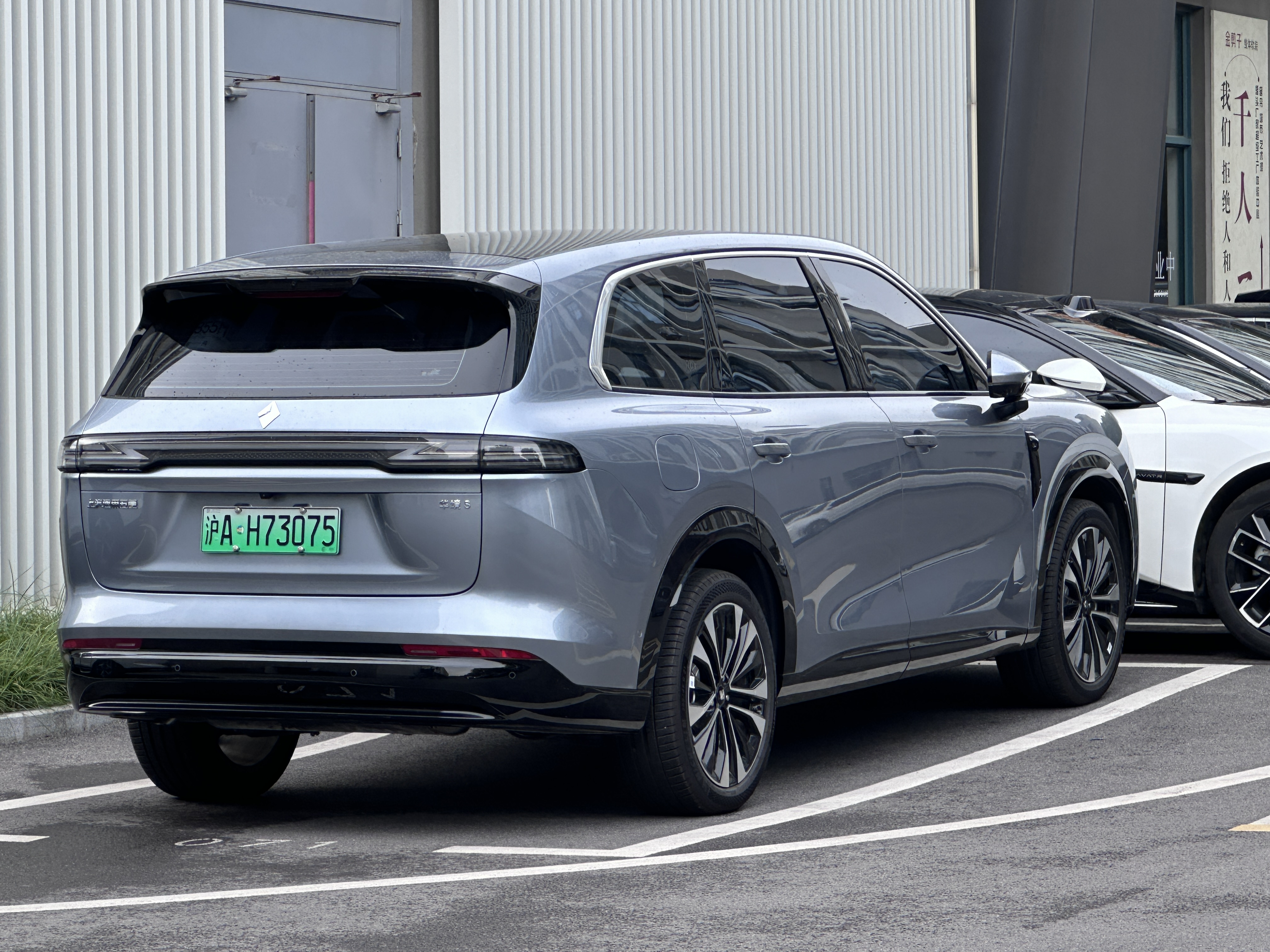
Rear view

On 6 September 2025, SAIC-GM-Wuling and Huawei signed an agreement to upgrade their already-existing strategic partnership, a partnership that focuses on 3 specific areas: Intelligent driving, smart cockpits, and intelligent manufacturing. The design of the Huajing S and the name were also teased on the same day.

The Huajing S was officially unveiled on 29 December 2025, and was launch in the first half of 2026. It utilizes the Tianyu Architecture and has a 6-seater (2+2+2) layout. Sales of the Huajing S began on 8 May 2026.

=== Design ===
The front end of the Huajing S uses a trapezoidal air intake and Z-shaped headlights connected by a light bar. The grille uses a U-shaped design with the Baojun logo above the headlights. The back also uses taillights with a similar design to the front lights.

=== Features ===
As the Huajing S was co-developed with Huawei, it uses Huawei's Qiankun 4.0 ADAS and the infotainment system runs HarmonySpace 5. The Huajing S will also use Huawei's Limera solid-state LiDAR-based system found in the HIMA's second-generation AITO M7. Side-view cameras are also placed on both exterior mirrors.

== Powertrain ==
The Huajing S uses Wuling's Lingxi plug-in hybrid system. The engine is a 1.5-liter turbocharged inline-4 producing 134 horsepower (100 kW; 136 PS) (141 hp (105 kW; 143 PS) gross) at 5,500rpm and 220 N⋅m (162 lb⋅ft) of torque and is paired with a 1-speed dedicated hybrid transmission which can mechanically connect the engine to the wheels at high speeds. Power is supplied by either a 31 or 41.9 kWh lithium iron phosphate battery. All Huajing S have a 268 horsepower (200 kW; 272 PS) (131 hp (98 kW; 133 PS) rated power) TZ180XY5L0 permanent magnet synchronous front motor. All-wheel drive variants add a 249 horsepower (186 kW; 252 PS) TZ210XS2J6 permanent magnet synchronous motor to the rear axle for a total of 517 horsepower (386 kW; 524 PS). Electric range depends on battery size, with the lowest possible range being 130 kilometres (81 mi) and the highest possible electric range being 175 kilometres (109 mi) on the WLTC cycle.

Specifications
Battery		Power	Torque	Electric range		10–70% charge time	0–100 km/h (62 mph)	Top speed	Kerb weight
Type	Weight	Power	Torque	WLTP	CLTC	10–70% charge time	0–100 km/h (62 mph)	Top speed	Kerb weight
31kWh LFP REPT	250 kg (551 lb)	268 hp (200 kW; 272 PS)	310 N⋅m (229 lb⋅ft)	130 km (81 mi)	200 km (124 mi)	18 min	8.3 sec	190 km/h (118 mph)	2,385 kg (5,258 lb)
41.9kWh LFP CATL	329–343 kg (725–756 lb)	268 hp (200 kW; 272 PS)	310 N⋅m (229 lb⋅ft)	175 km (109 mi)	255 km (158 mi)	14.5 min	8.6 sec	190 km/h (118 mph)	2,470 kg (5,445 lb)
41.9kWh LFP CATL	329–343 kg (725–756 lb)	517 hp (386 kW; 524 PS)	620 N⋅m (457 lb⋅ft)	160 km (99 mi)	235 km (146 mi)	14.5 min	5.2 sec	190 km/h (118 mph)	2,665 kg (5,875 lb)

== Sales ==
The Huajing S reached 25,000 deliveries on 8 September 2026.
