= AITO M8 =

Full-size luxury SUV

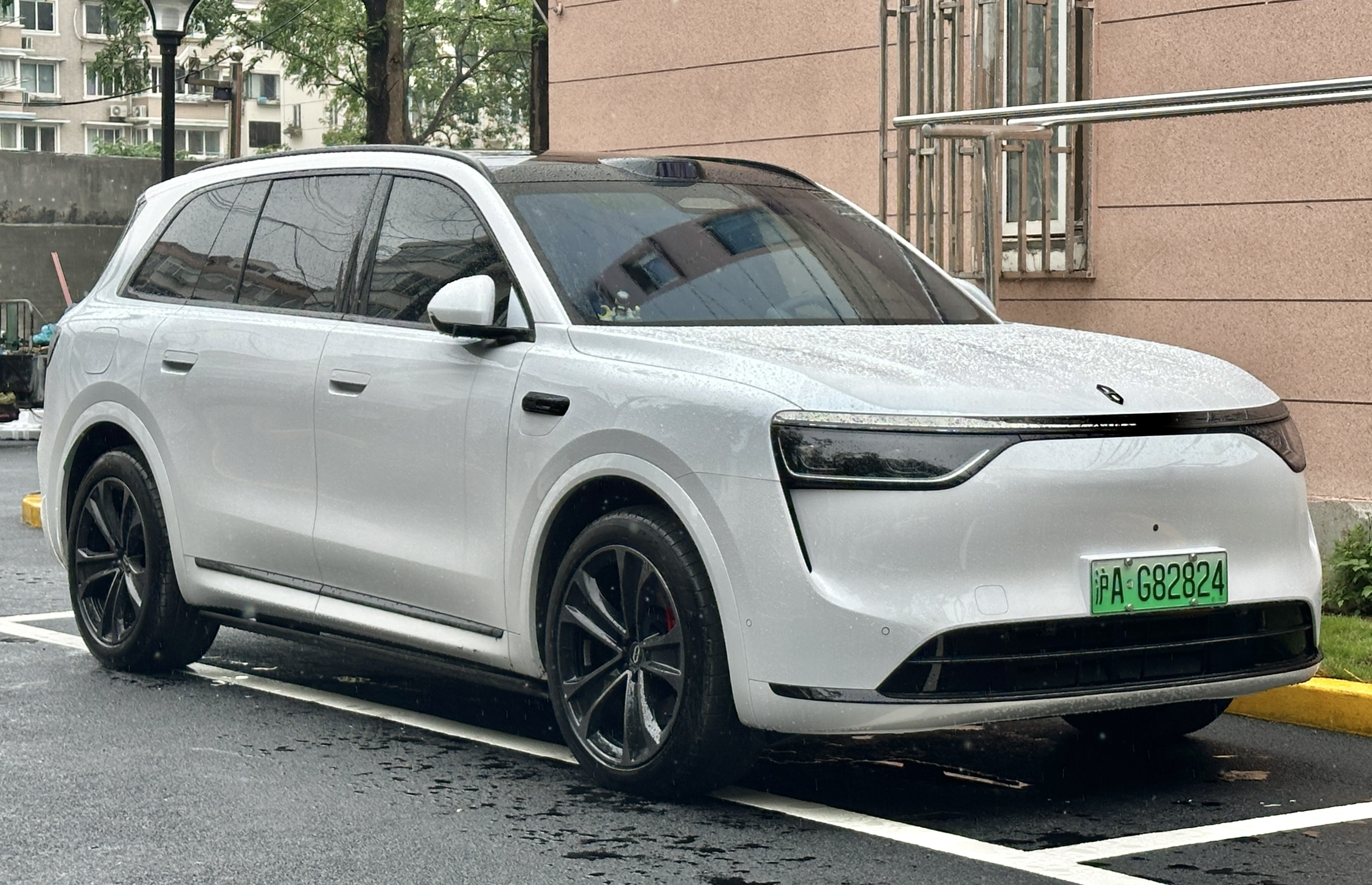

Overview
- Manufacturer: Seres Auto
- Production: 2025–present
- Assembly: China: Jiangbei, Chongqing

Body and chassis
- Class: Full-size luxury SUV
- Body style: 5-door SUV
- Layout: Front-engine, dual-motor, all-wheel drive
- Platform: Seres MF Platform
- Related: AITO M6; AITO M7; AITO M9

Powertrain
- Engine: Petrol range extender: 1.5 L HG15T turbo I4
- Power output: 227–392 kW (304–526 hp; 309–533 PS)
- Hybrid drivetrain: Range extender series plug-in hybrid
- Battery: 36.0 kWh LFP CATL; 52.0 kWh NMC CATL; 56 kWh LFP CATL; 75.4 kWh NMC CATL; 100 kWh NMC CATL; 120 kWh NMC CATL
- Range: 1,405–1,526 km (873–948 mi) CLTC
- Electric range: 201–310 km (125–193 mi) (EREV, CLTC); 625–800 km (388–497 mi) (EV, CLTC)

Dimensions
- Wheelbase: 3,105 mm (122.2 in)
- Length: 5,190 mm (204.3 in)
- Width: 1,999 mm (78.7 in)
- Height: 1,795 mm (70.7 in)
- Kerb weight: 2,555–2,715 kg (5,633–5,986 lb)

The AITO M8 (Chinese: 问界M8; pinyin: Wènjiè M8) is a full-size luxury SUV manufactured by Seres under the AITO brand in collaboration with HIMA, Huawei's multi-brand automotive alliance. The M8 is available in two powertrains, range extender electric (EREV) and battery electric (EV).

== Overview ==
The AITO M8 officially opened for reservations on March 6, 2025, and it was later officially launched on April 16, 2025.

The M8 is very similar in size to the more expensive AITO M9, only having a 40 mm (1.6 in) shorter length and 5 mm (0.20 in) shorter wheelbase and height. Like the M9, it is also available in two-row 5-seater and three-row 6-seater variants.

=== Design ===
The exterior has a similar overall design language to the M9. The front features a lower air intake grille, high-mounted headlights connected by a light bar element, and air vents at the corners serving as wheel well air curtains. The headlight surrounds have an illuminated star pattern, and the headlights are capable of projecting images onto the ground. The rear features a light bar design taillight element, which consists of an LED display array capable of displaying customizable designs. The doors are power operated, and can be controlled by gestures from outside; the rear hatch has a kick-sensing opening feature. It is available in six colors: Gilded Black, Warm Cloud White, Interstellar Blue, Meadow Green, Galaxy, and Dawn Light.

=== Features ===
The interior shares a similar layout to the M9, with an array of three displays integrated into the dashboard, supplemented by a 68-inch AR-HUD. The centre console contains two wireless charging pads, two cupholders, and a storage compartment. It is equipped with a 19-speaker sound system, featuring two speakers integrated into the driver's seat headrest. The back of the center console contains a refrigerator compartment and a control display for the rear seats and climate control zones. The rear seats have access to a 32-inch projector display, which can retract into a narrow 'floating window' mode to display passive information such as music, navigation and weather; it can also display a 100-inch outside the vehicle. In six-seater models, the passenger side second row seat has a 'zero-gravity' recline function, and the front passenger seat can fold forward to serve as a footrest if unoccupied; six-seater models have a 'quasi-zero gravity' seat instead, and the third row can recline between 25–33°. The interior is available in four colors: Baisha Apricot, Red Tea Orange, Amber Brown, and Nebula Red.

Six-seater models have 353 litres (12.5 cu ft) of rear cargo space, while five-seater models have 976 litres (34.5 cu ft). It can pass the moose test at 76.9 km/h (47.8 mph), and can brake from 100–0 km/h (62–0 mph) in 34.5 metres (113 ft).

It is equipped with Huawei's ADS 3.0 ADAS system, with a sensor suite that includes one roof-mounted 192-line solid-state LiDAR sensor, seven mmWave radars of which five are 4D, 11 cameras, and 12 ultrasonic sensors. It is capable of supervised autonomous driving and collision avoidance.

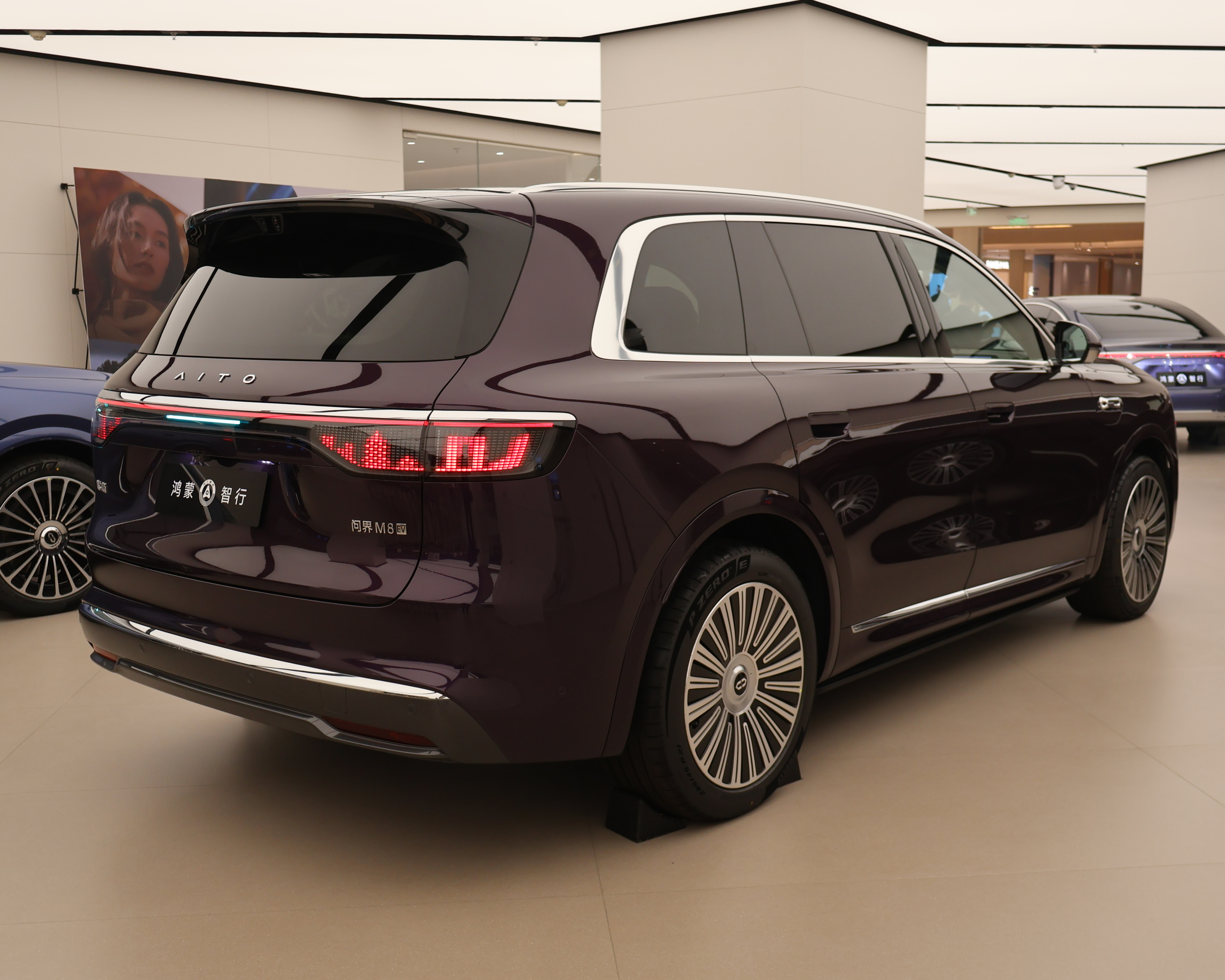
Rear view

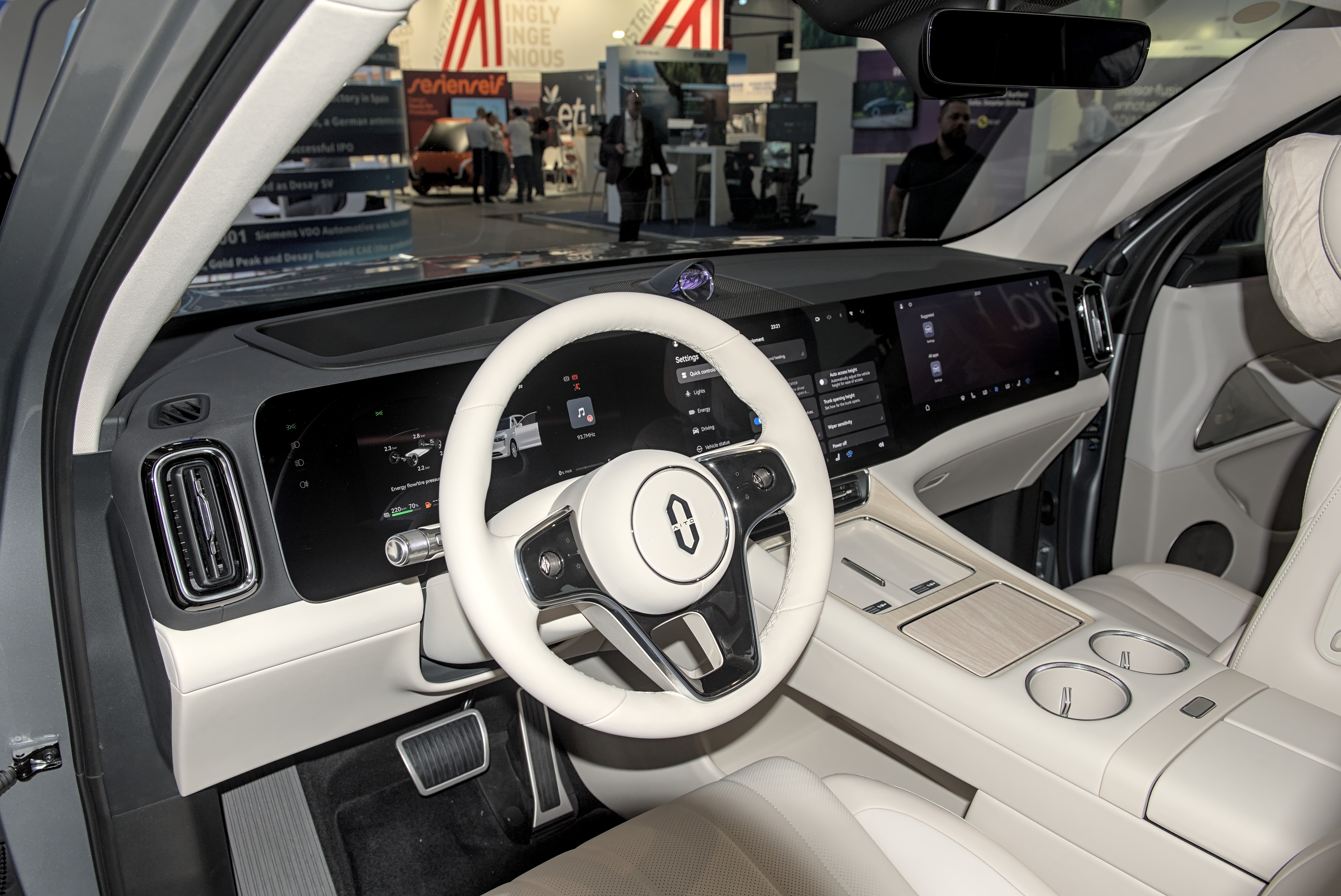
Interior

=== 2026 facelift ===
The M8 was facelifted for the 2027 model year, with pre-sales for the model opening on 30 September 2026.

The exterior features minor changes, including the addition of a chrome strip above the front light bar, a change to a honeycomb grille pattern for the lower air intake, pocket style door handles to comply with new Chinese safety regulations, redesigned taillights, new wheel options, and two new paint colors: Sky Veil Blue and Cangrong Green. Additionally, a new blind-spot camera have been added to the C-pillars. It has a drag coefficient of 0.254 C_{d}.

The interior has been upgraded with the latest Huawei HIMA ecosystem technologies, with the dashboard now featuring larger 17.2-inch 3.4K-resolution displays with reduced bezels as seen in the Aito M9 refresh earlier in the year. Additional changes include redesigned door armrests and larger door bins, driver's side glovebox, redesigned center console with wood trim and larger storage bin, second-row illuminated vanity mirrors in the seatback tables, and new diamond quilted upholstery throughout the cabin. The refrigerator can now reach temperatures as low as −18 °C (0 °F), and the second-row seats in six-seater variants can move laterally. Six-seater models now have three 'zero-gravity' recline capable seats. The rear passenger projector screen has been replaced with a 21-inch 4K ceiling-mounted display, and the sound system has been updated to a 25-speaker audio system.

The frunk in rear-wheel drive electric variants increases in volume to 210 L (7.4 cu ft) from the previous 149 L (5.3 cu ft), and the underfloor compartment in the rear cargo area of six-seater models has been expanded from 39 L (1.4 cu ft) to 63 L (2.2 cu ft). Aito says the M8 has an emergency wading depth of 750 mm (29.5 in).

In addition to the previously available dual-chamber dual-valve air suspension and continuously variable dampers, the M8 now also has optional ±8° of rear-wheel steering which paired with 40.1° maximum front-wheel steering angle results in a reduced turning radius of 4.98 metres (16.3 ft) from 5.75 metres (18.9 ft), and the suspension system has been retuned.

The ADAS system has been updated with the latest Huawei 38-sensor suite claimed to be L3-ready, including one 896-line long-range front-facing roof-mounted LiDAR and 3 wide-angle LiDARs. It is equipped with the Qiankun ADS 5 system using the WEWA 2.0 architecture.

The powertrain has been refreshed with larger battery packs available for both range extender and pure electric variants. The range extender variants are also upgraded to an 800-volt architecture and have a marginally more powerful front motor. Aito claims the range extender engine is powerful enough to sustain 160 km/h (99 mph) with the battery fully drained.

== Powertrain ==
At launch, the M8 is a range extender electric and battery electric vehicle with all-wheel drive. It has a 1.5-litre turbocharged direct-injected petrol engine supplied by Seres producing 118 kW (158 hp; 160 PS). It has a 165 kW (221 hp; 224 PS) front motor and a 227 kW (304 hp; 309 PS) rear motor, outputting a combined 392 kW (526 hp; 533 PS). Power is supplied by a choice of two CATL-supplied batteries, either a 36 kWh LFP pack providing a CLTC range rating of 201 kilometres (125 mi), or a 52 kWh NMC pack shared with the M9 providing 310 kilometres (193 mi) of range. It has a combined range of up to 1,526 kilometres (948 mi), a 0–100 km/h (62 mph) time of 5.2 seconds, and a top speed of 200 km/h (124 mph).

For the 2027 model year, both the range extender and battery electric powertrains receive new battery packs. The range extender variants now have 800-volt architectures and are equipped with either a 56 kWh LFP pack providing 276 kilometres (171 mi) WLTP electric range, or a 75.4 kWh NMC pack providing 360 kilometres (224 mi). Additionally, the range extender's front motor in all-wheel drive configurations has been updated to output 170 kW (228 hp; 231 PS) and 278 N⋅m (205 lb⋅ft) of torque. The battery electric powertrain now has a 120 kWh NMC pack option providing up to 830 kilometres (516 mi) of CLTC range.

Model year	Battery		Engine	Motor			Electric range		Top speed	Kerb weight
Model year	Type	Weight	Engine	Front	Rear	Total	WLTP	CLTC	Top speed	Kerb weight
EREV
	37 kWh (36.019)LFP CATL	290 kg (639 lb)	1.5 L HG15T turbo I4 DI 115 kW (154 hp; 156 PS) (gross: 118 kW (158 hp; 160 PS))	165 kW (221 hp; 224 PS)	227 kW (304 hp; 309 PS)	392 kW (526 hp; 533 PS)	161 km (100 mi)	201 km (125 mi)	200 km/h (124 mph)	2,640–2,695 kg (5,820–5,941 lb)
2025	53.4 kWh (51.975) NMC CATL	302 kg (666 lb)	1.5 L HG15T turbo I4 DI 115 kW (154 hp; 156 PS) (gross: 118 kW (158 hp; 160 PS))	165 kW (221 hp; 224 PS)	227 kW (304 hp; 309 PS)	392 kW (526 hp; 533 PS)	235 km (146 mi)	310 km (190 mi)	200 km/h (124 mph)	2,660–2,715 kg (5,864–5,986 lb)
2026	53.4 kWh (51.975) NMC CATL	302 kg (666 lb)	1.5 L HG15T turbo I4 DI 115 kW (154 hp; 156 PS) (gross: 118 kW (158 hp; 160 PS))	165 kW (221 hp; 224 PS)	227 kW (304 hp; 309 PS)	392 kW (526 hp; 533 PS)	252 km (157 mi)	310 km (190 mi)	200 km/h (124 mph)	2,660–2,715 kg (5,864–5,986 lb)
2026	53.4 kWh (51.975) NMC CATL	302 kg (666 lb)	1.5 L HG15T turbo I4 DI 115 kW (154 hp; 156 PS) (gross: 118 kW (158 hp; 160 PS))	—	227 kW (304 hp; 309 PS)	227 kW (304 hp; 309 PS)	262 km (163 mi)	322 km (200 mi)	190 km/h (118 mph)	2,575–2,630 kg (5,677–5,798 lb)
2027	56.036 kWh LFP CATL	406 kg (895 lb)	1.5 L HG15T turbo I4 DI 115 kW (154 hp; 156 PS) (gross: 118 kW (158 hp; 160 PS))		227 kW (304 hp; 309 PS)	227 kW (304 hp; 309 PS)	276 km (171 mi)	340 km (211 mi)	200 km/h (124 mph)	2,725–2,810 kg (6,008–6,195 lb)
2027	56.036 kWh LFP CATL	406 kg (895 lb)	1.5 L HG15T turbo I4 DI 115 kW (154 hp; 156 PS) (gross: 118 kW (158 hp; 160 PS))	170 kW (230 hp; 230 PS)	227 kW (304 hp; 309 PS)	397 kW (532 hp; 540 PS)	265 km (165 mi)	320 km (199 mi)	200 km/h (124 mph)	2,830–2,895 kg (6,239–6,382 lb)
2027	75.408 kWh NMC CATL	416 kg (917 lb)	1.5 L HG15T turbo I4 DI 115 kW (154 hp; 156 PS) (gross: 118 kW (158 hp; 160 PS))	170 kW (230 hp; 230 PS)	227 kW (304 hp; 309 PS)	397 kW (532 hp; 540 PS)	360 km (224 mi)	432 km (268 mi)	200 km/h (124 mph)	2,840–2,905 kg (6,261–6,404 lb)
BEV
2025	100 kWh (97.644) NMC CATL	518 kg (1,142 lb)	—	—	227 kW (304 hp; 309 PS)	227 kW (304 hp; 309 PS)		705 km (438 mi)	200 km/h (120 mph)	2,555 kg (5,633 lb)
2025	100 kWh (97.644) NMC CATL	518 kg (1,142 lb)	—	160 kW (215 hp; 218 PS)	227 kW (304 hp; 309 PS)	387 kW (519 hp; 526 PS)		625–655 km (388–407 mi)	200 km/h (120 mph)	2,670–2,715 kg (5,886–5,986 lb)
2027	100 kWh (97.644) NMC CATL	518 kg (1,142 lb)	—	—	227 kW (304 hp; 309 PS)	227 kW (304 hp; 309 PS)		675–708 km (419–440 mi)	200 km/h (120 mph)	2,585–2,685 kg (5,699–5,919 lb)
2027	100 kWh (97.644) NMC CATL	518 kg (1,142 lb)	—	160 kW (215 hp; 218 PS)	227 kW (304 hp; 309 PS)	387 kW (519 hp; 526 PS)		652 km (405 mi)	200 km/h (120 mph)	2,745–2,820 kg (6,052–6,217 lb)
2027	120 kWh (120.04329) NMC CATL	628 kg (1,385 lb)	—	—	227 kW (304 hp; 309 PS)	227 kW (304 hp; 309 PS)		800–830 km (497–516 mi)	200 km/h (120 mph)	2,680–2,780 kg (5,908–6,129 lb)
2027	120 kWh (120.04329) NMC CATL	628 kg (1,385 lb)	—	160 kW (215 hp; 218 PS)	227 kW (304 hp; 309 PS)	387 kW (519 hp; 526 PS)		735–763 km (457–474 mi)	200 km/h (120 mph)	2,840–2,915 kg (6,261–6,426 lb)

== Safety ==
The M8 received the highest overall score in the C-NCAP 2024 revision when results were released in August 2025 with 93.7%, beating the previous best of 93.5% held by the Xiaomi SU7. It scored 5.62%, 7.34%, and 9.99% higher than average in the occupant protection, vulnerable road user protection, and active safety categories, respectively.

C-NCAP test results 2025 Aito M8 Max 6-seater (EREV 37 kWh)
Category		%
Overall:	5.5 /5 stars	93.7%
Occupant protection:		96.26%
Vulnerable road users:		86.03%
Active safety:		96.34%

== Sales ==
The AITO M8 exceeded 7,500 orders after one hour and 21,000 orders after six hours, and 28,000 orders 12 hours after presales had kicked off in China on March 6, 2025. Two weeks later on March 20, 2025, Harmony Intelligent Mobility Alliance announced that the pre-orders for the M8 exceeded 70,000 units since the opening on March 6. On April 29, HIMA announced that the M8 has over 60,000 firm orders, and launched a long-wait compensation scheme where customers receive a 200 yuan ($27 USD) discount each day their wait time exceeds 10 weeks capped at 10,000 yuan ($1380 USD). Nine days later on 8 May, the M8 reached 70,000 firm orders.

At a press event at Auto Shanghai 2025, Yu Chengdong said that 70% of the M8's majority family-oriented customers chose the 6-seater version.

Year	China		
Year	EREV	EV	Total
2025	123,440	26,480	149,920

== See also ==
- Harmony Intelligent Mobility Alliance
