= AITO M6 =

Mid-size luxury SUV

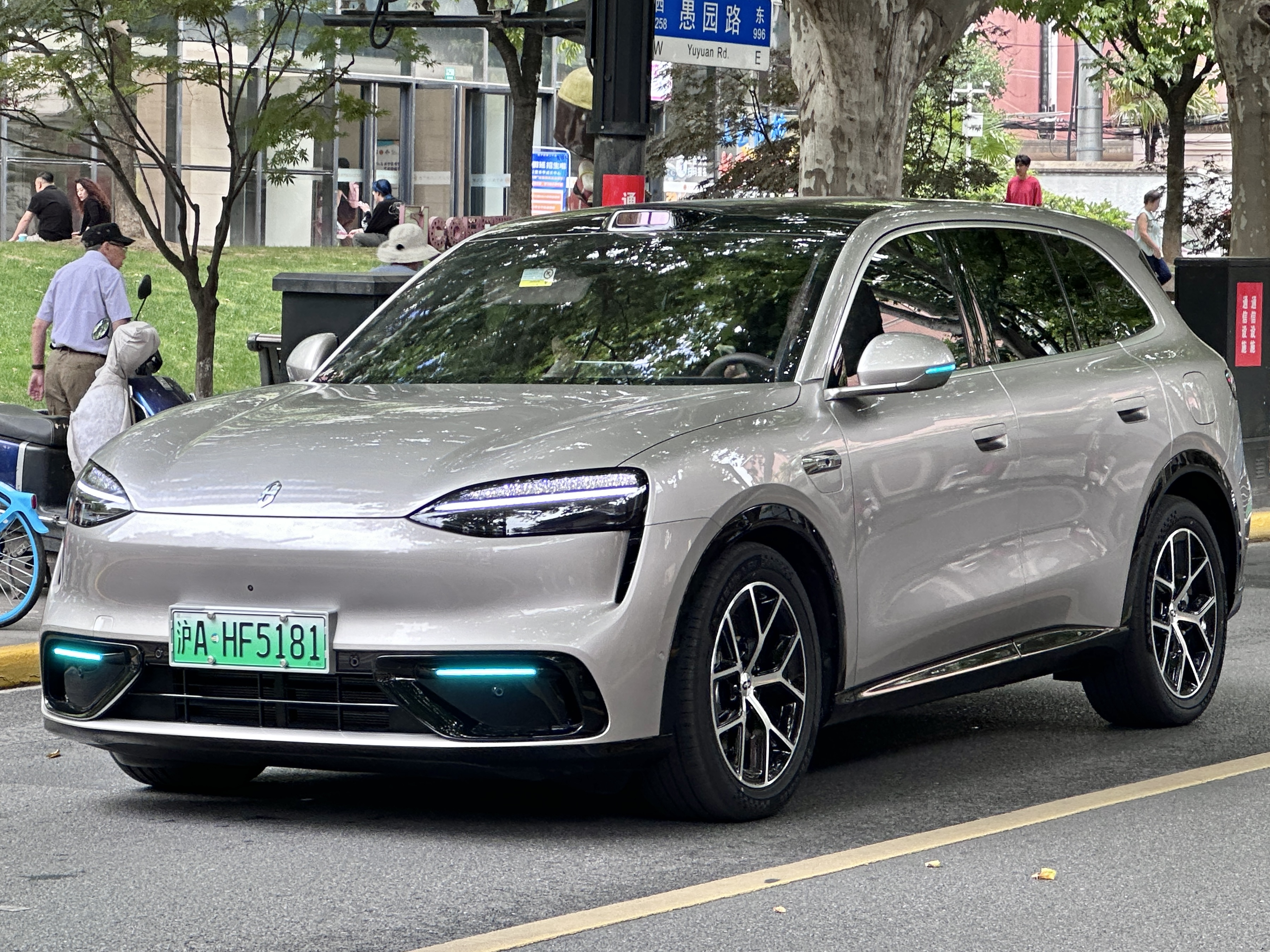
- The AITO M6 in Shanghai, China.

Overview
- Manufacturer: Seres Auto
- Production: 2026–present
- Assembly: China: Jiangbei District, Chongqing

Body and chassis
- Class: Mid-size luxury SUV (D)
- Body style: 5-door SUV
- Layout: Battery electric: Rear-motor, rear-wheel-drive; Dual-motor, all-wheel-drive; Range-extended EV: Front-engine, dual-motor, all-wheel-drive
- Platform: Seres MF Platform
- Related: AITO M7; AITO M8; AITO M9

Powertrain
- Engine: Petrol range extender: 1.5 L H15RT turbo I4
- Power output: 304 hp (227 kW; 308 PS) (RWD EV); 456 hp (340 kW; 462 PS) (AWD EV); 150 hp (110 kW; 150 PS) (EREV, engine); 462 hp (345 kW; 468 PS) (EREV)
- Hybrid drivetrain: Series (EREV)
- Battery: 36.0 kWh LFP; 52.0 kWh NMC; 97.6 kWh NMC; LFP CATL (EV); LIB/SIB CATL (EREV)
- Electric range: 665–760 km (413–472 mi) (EV); 180–272 km (112–169 mi) (EREV)

Dimensions
- Wheelbase: 2,950 mm (116.1 in)
- Length: 4,960 mm (195.3 in)
- Width: 1,985 mm (78.1 in)
- Height: 1,736 mm (68.3 in)
- Curb weight: 2,395–2,565 kg (5,280–5,655 lb)

The AITO M6 (Chinese: 问界M6; pinyin: Wènjiè M6) is a battery electric and range-extended mid-size luxury SUV produced by Seres Auto and sold under the AITO brand that is run in collaboration with HIMA, Huawei's multi-brand automotive alliance and sales network.

== Overview ==
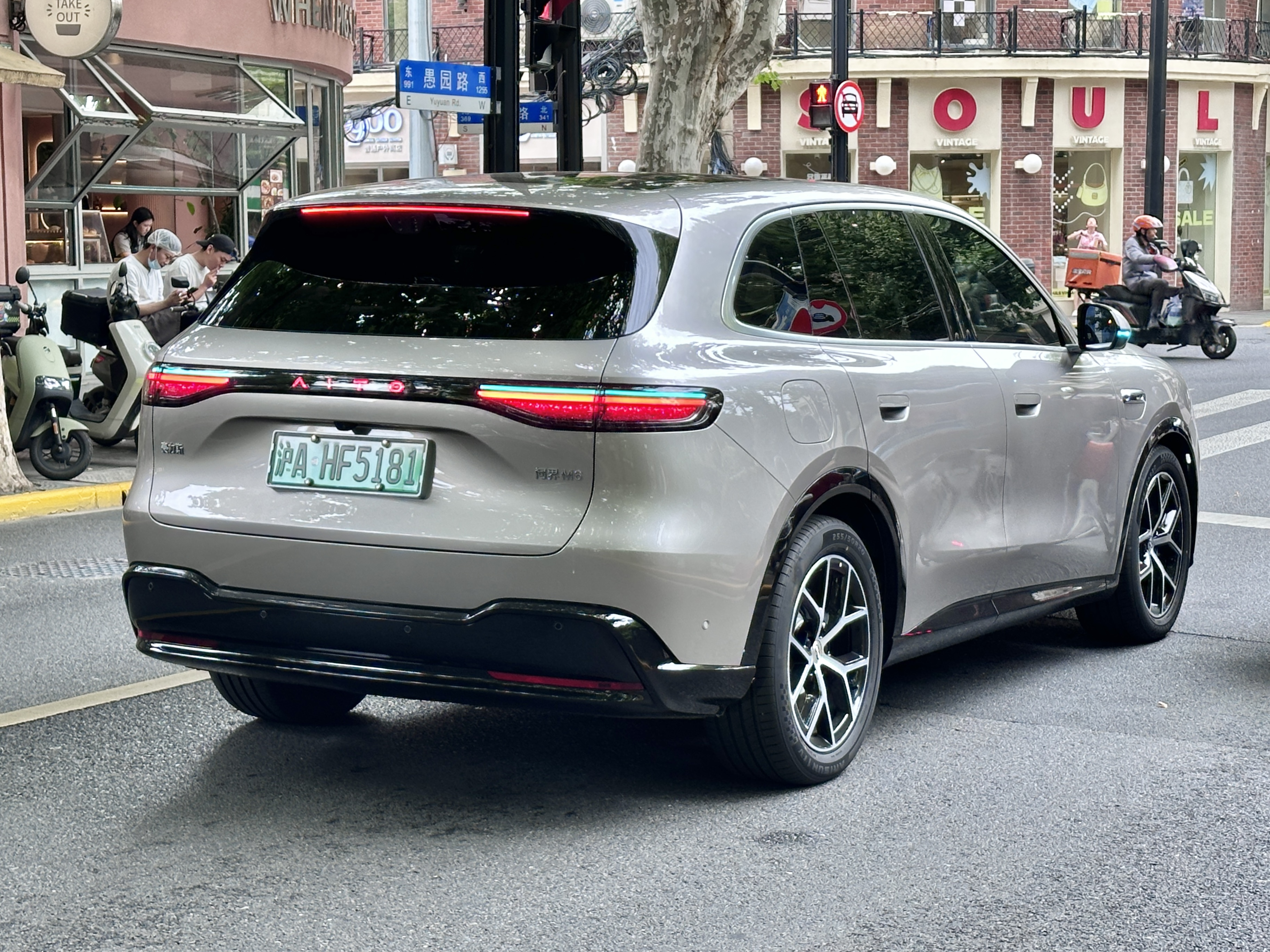
Rear view

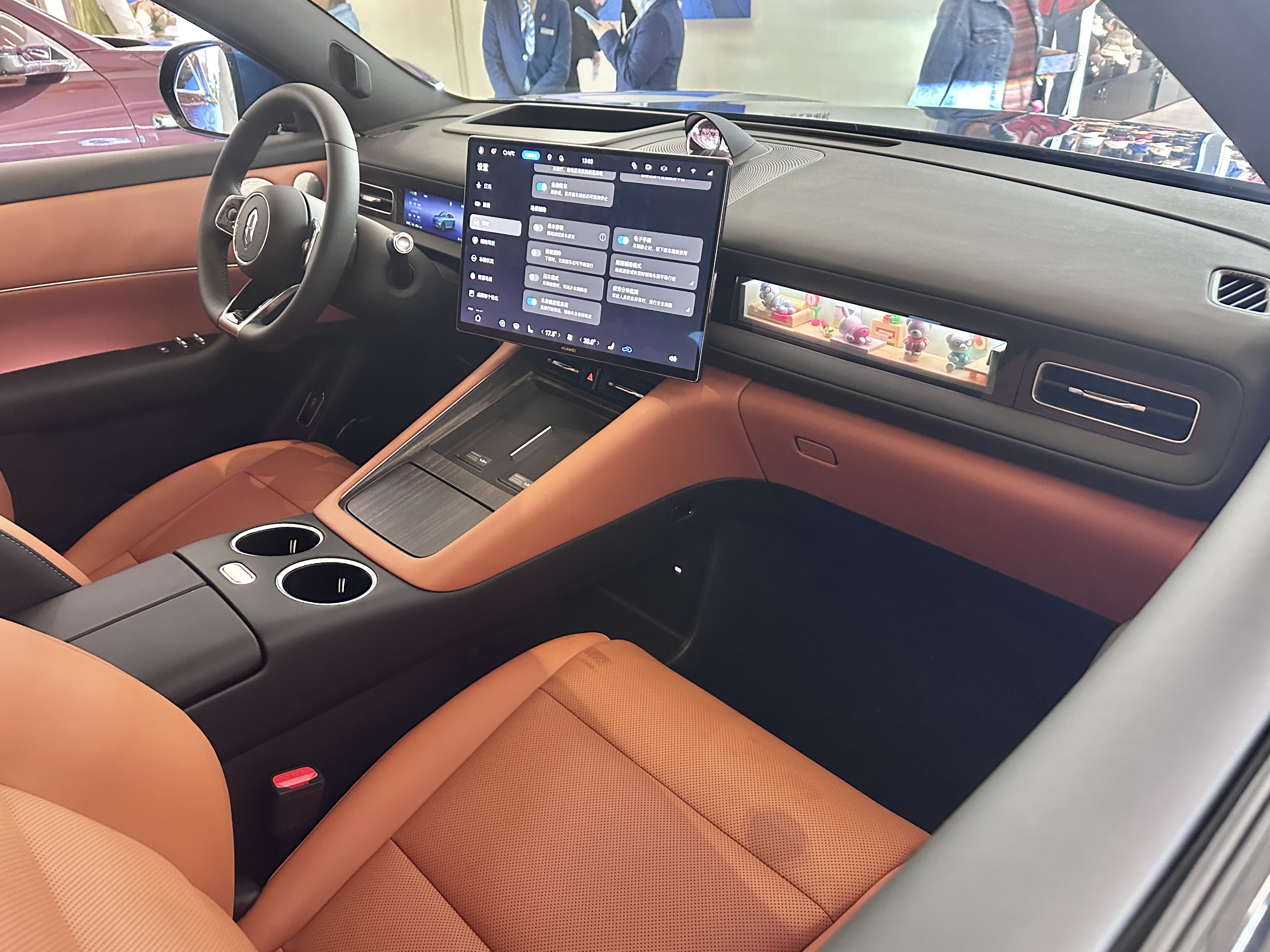
Interior

On February 3, 2026, HIMA released official photos of the AITO M6. As with all AITO models, the M6 will be offered in both battery electric and range-extended forms. It is expected to be priced above the M5 and below the M7. The M6 will also target the "¥250,000 small family SUV segment" and will not replace the M5. The M6 will debut in the spring of 2026 and will launch in the second quarter of the same year. Once launched, it will complete AITO's entry-level to flagship enter product matrix.

The M6 was launched alongside the facelifted M9 and the long-wheelbase version of the same car.

Pre-sales began on March 23, 2026. The range-extended version is cheaper than the battery electric version.

=== Design ===
Spyshots of a prototype M6 from December 2025 show a closed front grille, similar headlamp clusters to the M5, a thin horizontal light bar or chrome strip, a trapezoidal intake outline, a rounded body profile, semi-hidden door handles, and a roof-mounted spoiler with an integrated camera.

=== Features ===
The interior features a rotating liquid crystal display central touchscreen. A column shifter comes standard. Dual wireless chargers and cup holders also come standard. The M6 uses a hollowed out console that allows for items to be stored inside, and also comes with hooks.

== Powertrain ==
The battery electric version is available in both rear-wheel-drive and all-wheel-drive with the range-extended version being exclusively available in all-wheel-drive. The battery electric rear-wheel-drive version produces 304 horsepower (227 kW; 308 PS) and the all-wheel-drive version uses a less powerful 241 horsepower (180 kW; 244 PS) rear motor but is combined with a 215 horsepower (160 kW; 218 PS) front motor to produce a total of 462 horsepower (345 kW; 468 PS). The EREV model uses the same rear motor as the battery electric AWD version but produces 6 more horsepower due to the front motor producing 221 horsepower instead of 215 horsepower, bringing the total horsepower to 462 horsepower (345 kW; 468 PS).

Specifications
Model	Battery		Range	Curb weight
Model	Type	Weight	Electric	Curb weight
Short Range EREV	36.019 kWh LFP	290 kg (639 lb)	180 km (112 mi)	2,545 kg (5,611 lb)
Long Range EREV	51.975 kWh NMC	302 kg (666 lb)	260–272 km (162–169 mi)	2,520–2,565 kg (5,556–5,655 lb)
BEV	97.644 kWh NMC	518 kg (1,142 lb)	715–760 km (444–472 mi)	2,395–2,460 kg (5,280–5,423 lb)
BEV	97.644 kWh NMC	518 kg (1,142 lb)	665–705 km (413–438 mi)	2,515–2,565 kg (5,545–5,655 lb)
