= AITO (marque) =

Chinese automotive marque owned by Seres Group

- Product type: Automotive marque
- Current owner: Seres Group
- Produced by: Seres Auto
- Country: China
- Introduced: December 2, 2021; 4 years ago
- Related brands: Luxeed (Chery); Stelato (BAIC BluePark); Maextro (JAC Group); SAIC (SAIC Motor)
- Markets: China, UAE
- Ambassadors: Zhang Xinghai (张兴海, Chairman and Founder of Seres Group)
- Website: Official website (in AITO); Official website (in HIMA)

AITO (Chinese: 问界汽车; pinyin: Wènjiè Qìchē) is a Chinese electric vehicle marque owned by Chinese vehicle manufacturer Seres Group and marketed by Chongqing AITO Auto Sales Co., Ltd. (Chinese: 重庆问界汽车销售有限公司). The marque was launched in 2021 and offers electric cars with Huawei's autonomous driving systems and the HarmonyOS operating system.

AITO is the first brand under Huawei's Harmony Intelligent Mobility Alliance (HIMA, 鸿蒙智行) collaboration model, in which Huawei leads the product design and development process and supplies key components such as the powertrain, ADAS solutions, and vehicle software, to deliver a completed design for the automaker to manufacture.

The name AITO stands for "Adding Intelligence to Auto".

== History ==
On December 2, 2021, the AITO brand was launched at the Seres Group's Liangjiang factory in Chongqing. On December 23, 2021, Huawei announced AITO's first vehicle, the AITO M5. It is based on the Seres SF5 SUV, and is the first vehicle Huawei developed with Seres Group. At the time Seres was responsible for the entire life cycle of the vehicle, including research and development, manufacturing, and after-sales service. Huawei was only involved in product definition, development, and sales channels. Starting in 2023, Huawei started handling after-sales services and deliveries alongside Seres. Both companies are engaged in joint quality control and marketing. AITO vehicles are officially distributed by Chongqing AITO Auto Sales Co., Ltd. (previously known as Seres Auto Sales Co., Ltd.).

In March 2023, the brand was briefly rebranded from "AITO问界; AITO Wènjiè" to "华为问界; Huawei Wènjiè" (marketed as "HUAWEI 问界") before Yu Chengdong (Richard Yu), the CEO of the Huawei Consumer BG and the chairman of Intelligent Automotive Solution, personally issued that all promotional materials related to Huawei will be removed from AITO stores on April 1.

In June 2023, AITO's Chinese name (问界; Wènjiè) and its trademark was transferred from a company called Beijing Ruidekaizhuo Technology and Trade Co., Ltd. to Huawei. However, the trademark transferred to Huawei at that time does not include the English trademark for "AITO" and its logo in the Class 12 of the Nice Classification (for vehicles), which still belongs to Seres.

In July 2024, Huawei announced the transfer of the English trademarks of AITO and the related patents it holds back to Seres Group at the cost of 2.5 billion RMB. According to Yu Chengdong (Richard Yu), the reason for the transfer was due to Chinese regulations which stipulate that automobile brands must be owned by its manufacturer.

== Operations ==
According to Yu Chengdong (Richard Yu), the AITO brand is an ecosystem brand and represents a new business model. Huawei will not directly manufacture cars but is dedicated to helping car companies sell their vehicles through product design, supply chain management, quality control, software ecosystems, user experience management, brand marketing, and sales channels. Each of Huawei's partner manufacturers will specialize in a specific vehicle category and class, and each manufacturer's product lineup will be non-overlapping, all combined under Huawei's comprehensive strategy.

In September 2026, HIMA and AITO jointly announced that AITO would take over the development, design, brand marketing, sales channel, and service system from Huawei, with Huawei participating only in part of the development work. This is a major change in the HIMA cooperation model since its establishment.

=== Overseas operations ===
AITO signed a cooperation agreement with Performance Plus Motors, a subsidiary of the luxury car dealership network Abu Dhabi Motors. In the UAE, the AITO M9 full-size luxury SUV is marketed as the AITO 9. Deliveries to the UAE commenced on the same day, alongside test drives.

== Technology ==
=== HarmonyOS Cockpit ===
The HarmonyOS Cockpit is Huawei's solution for electric and autonomous cars powered by its Kirin line of a system-on-chip (SoC), augmented reality head-up displays (AR-HUD) and smart instrument cluster. Huawei opened up the APIs of HarmonyOS Cockpit to help automobile OEMs, suppliers and ecosystem partners in developing different features.

=== Autonomous Driving System ===
AITO vehicles are equipped with ADS (Autonomous Driving System) developed by Huawei. For the current ADS 2.0, it is composite of 128 LiDARs, 11 HD cameras, 3 MMW radars, and 12 ultra sonic radars and Huawei self-developed chipset.

The ADS is trained on real-world driving data and can achieve Level 2+ autonomous driving. It can perform human-like judgment and operation such as accurate turning, giving way to pedestrians, recognizing and avoiding irregular obstacles, as well as detecting and avoiding animals. It can also perform automatic and valet parking.

According to Huawei, the ADS 2.0 was priced at 36,000 RMB (~5200 USD) per vehicle when sold to partner manufacturer.

== Products ==
=== Current models ===
- AITO M9 (2023–present), full-size SUV (BEV/EREV)
- AITO M8 (2025–present), full-size SUV (BEV/EREV)
- AITO M7 (2022–present), mid-size SUV (BEV/EREV)
- AITO M6 (2026–present), mid-size SUV (BEV/EREV)
- AITO M5 (2022–present), compact SUV (BEV/EREV)
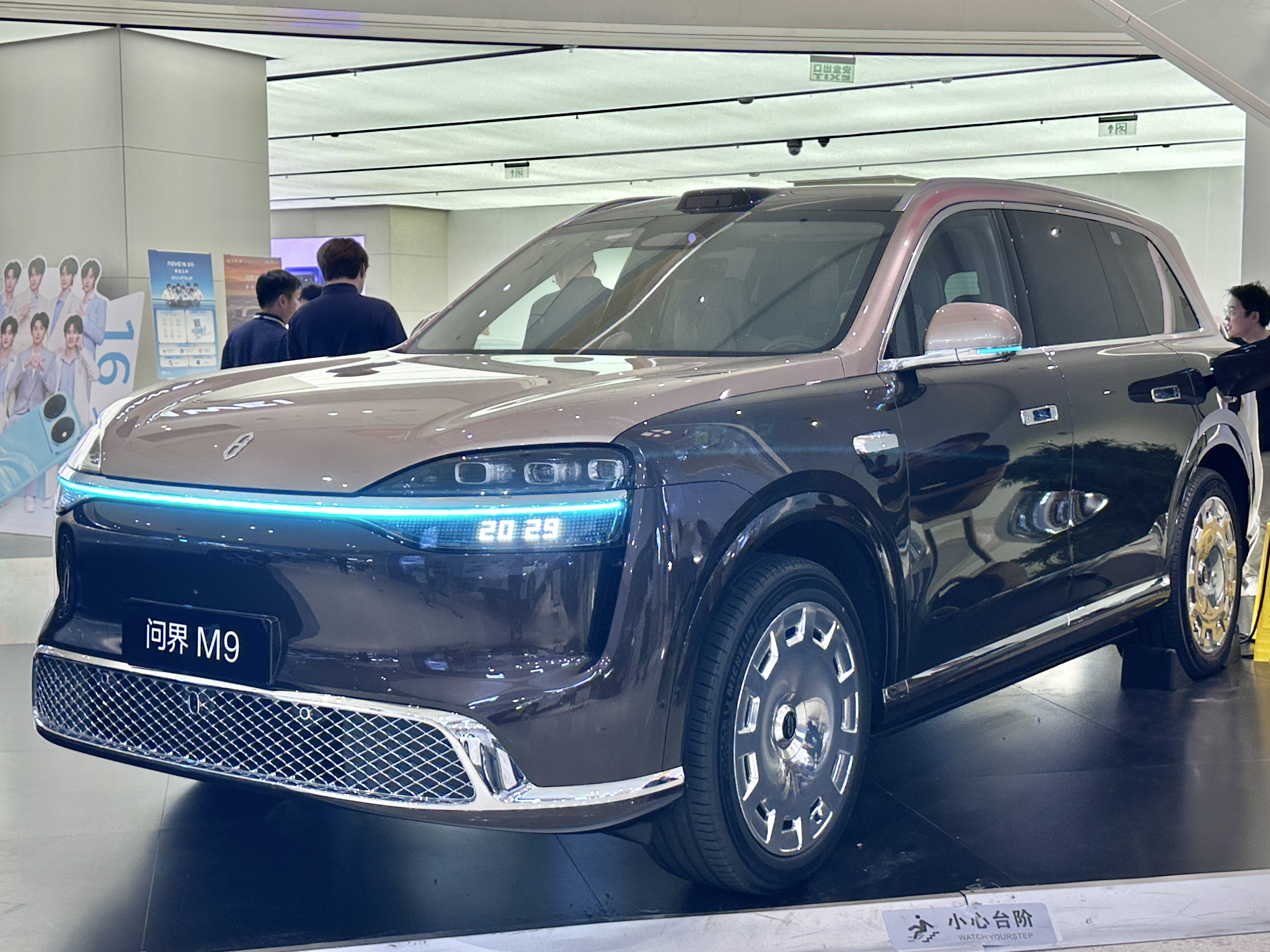
AITO M9

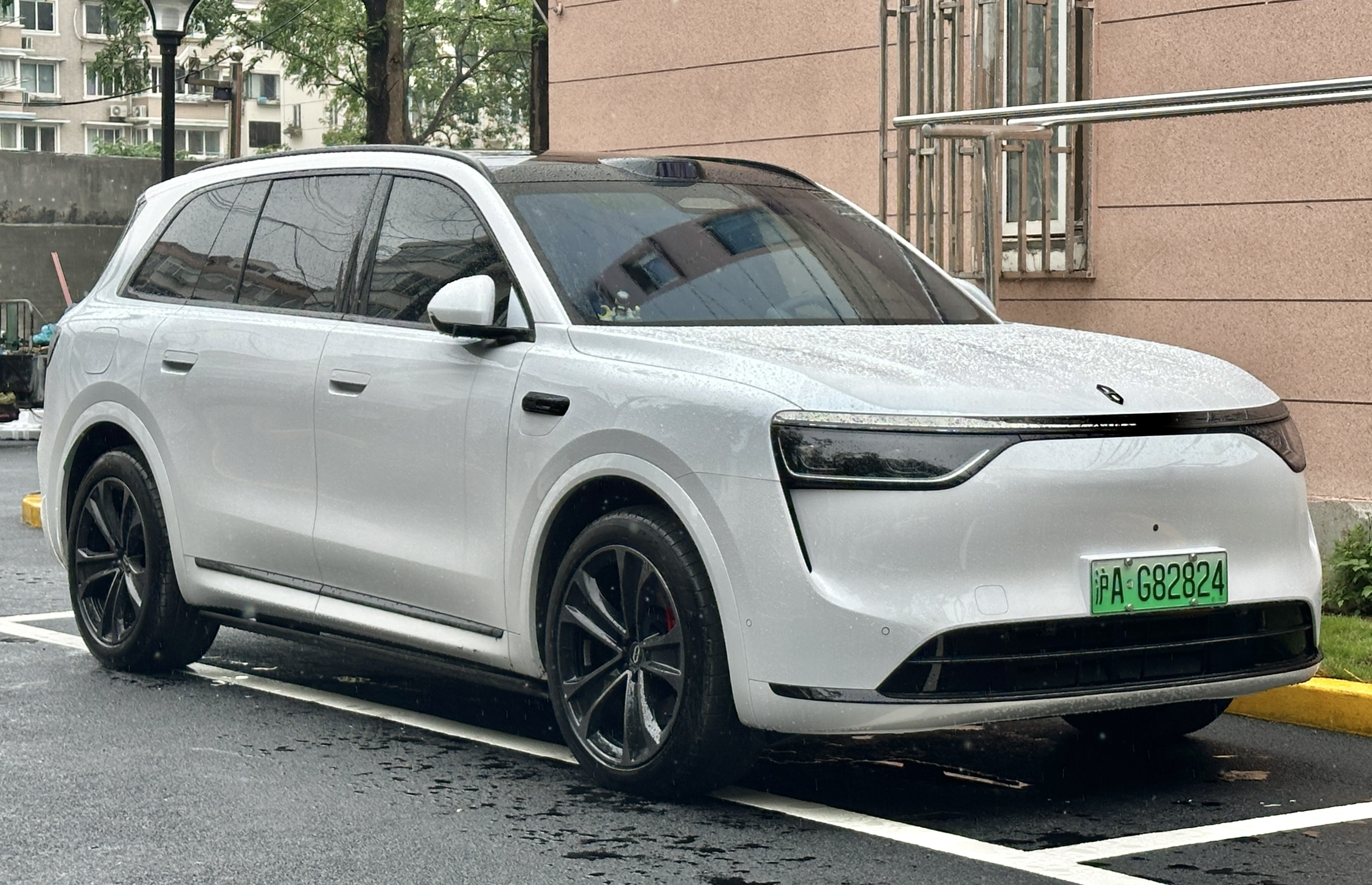
AITO M8

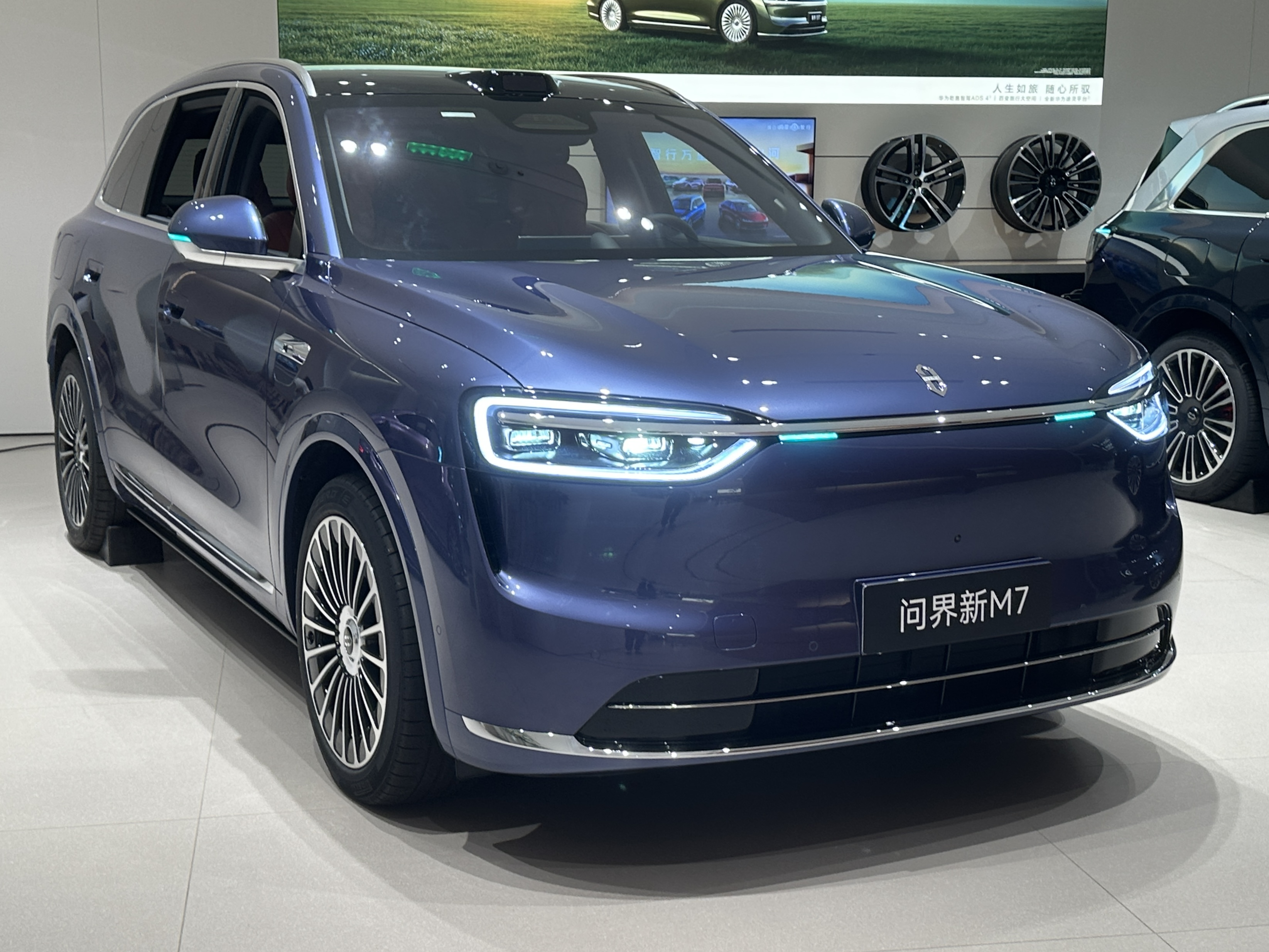
AITO M7

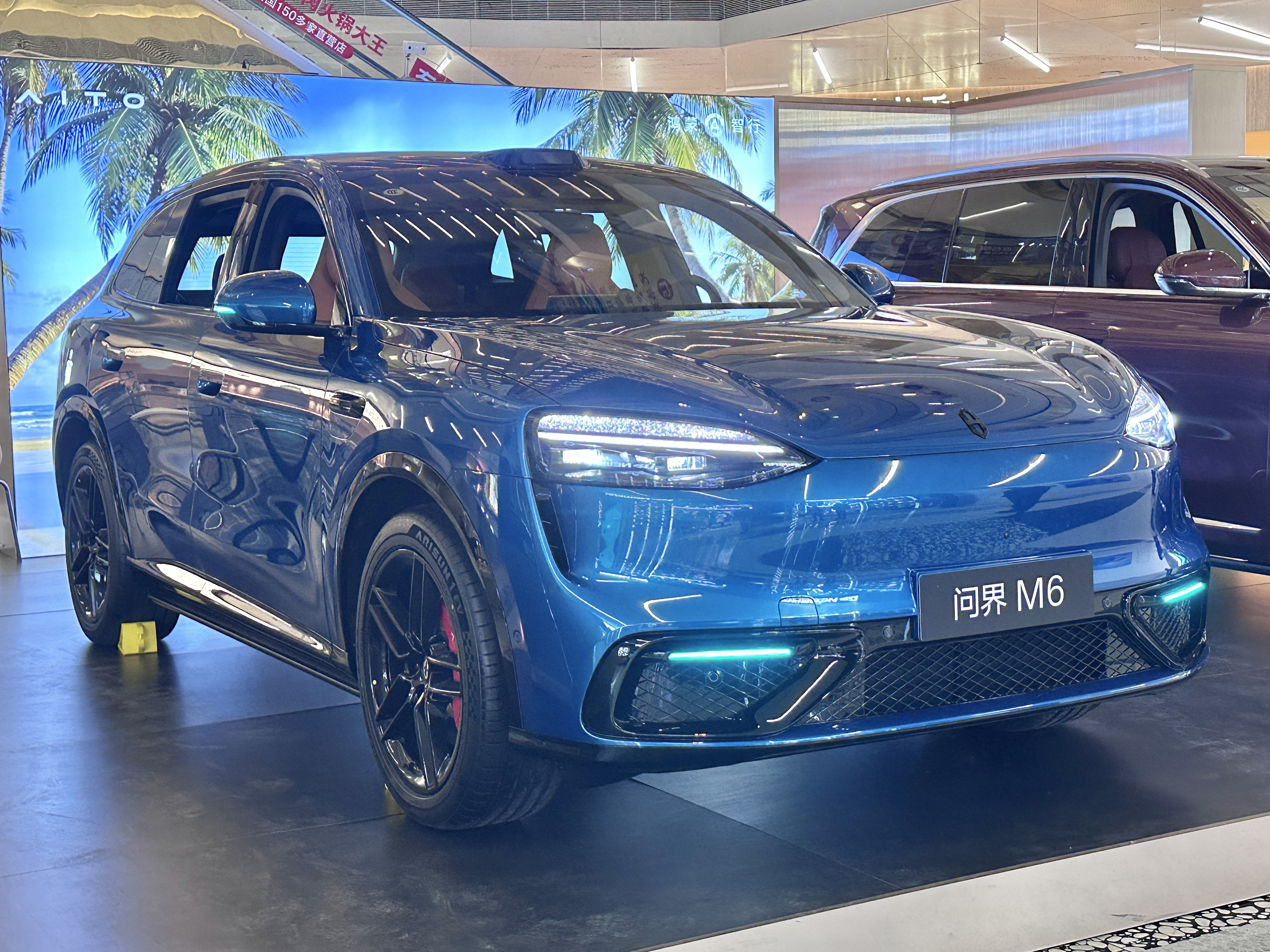
AITO M6

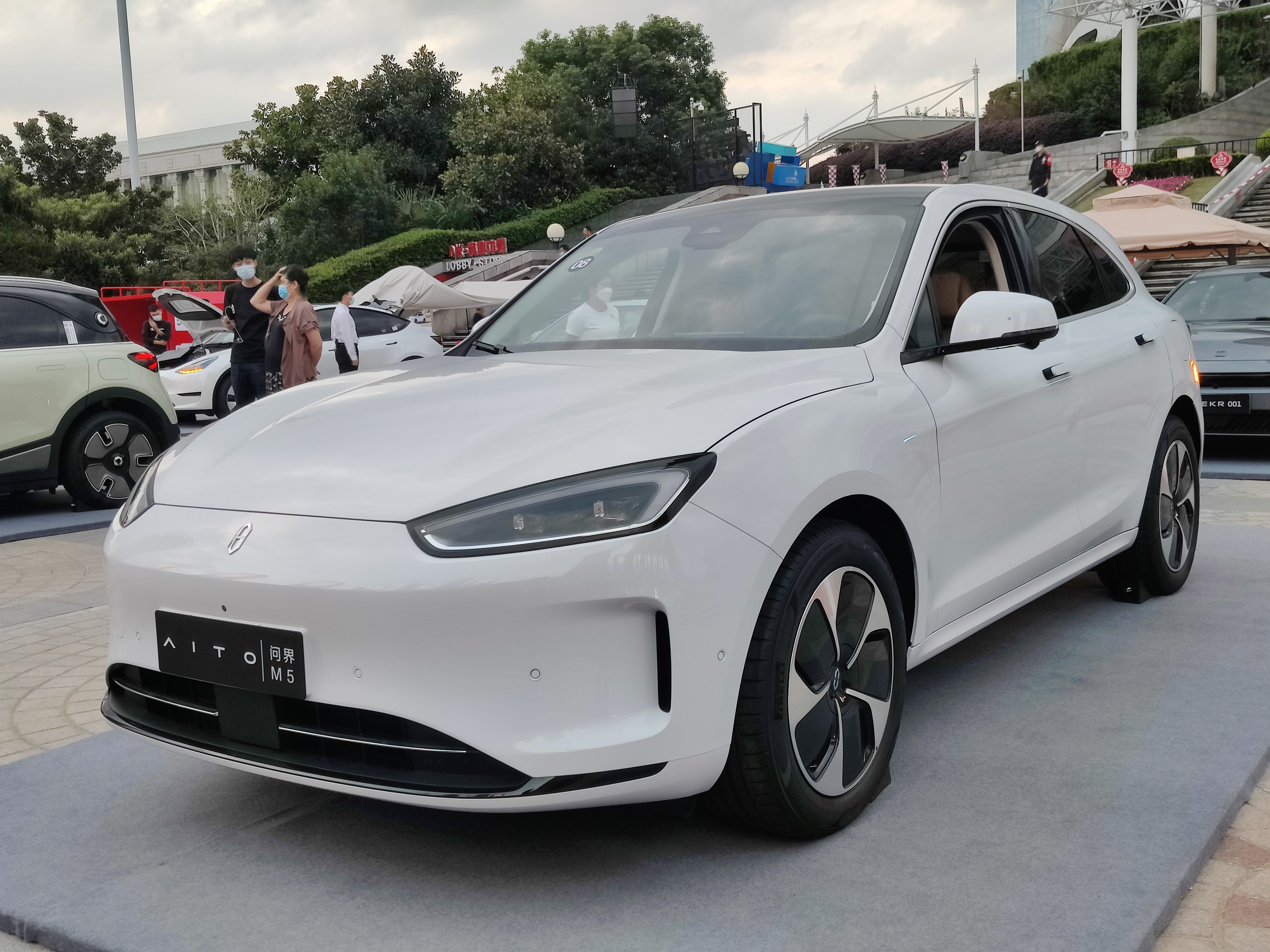
AITO M5

== Sponsorship ==
In June 2025, AITO became a full strategic partner of the 2025 China Golden Rooster and Hundred Flowers Film Festival.

== Sales ==
Year	Total
2022	76,180
2023	94,380
2024	386,907

== See also ==
- Harmony Intelligent Mobility Alliance
- Seres Group
- Luxeed
- Stelato
- Maextro
- SAIC (marque)
- Automobile manufacturers and brands of China
- List of automobile manufacturers of China
- Automotive industry in China
- Yinwang
