= Huajing (marque) =

Chinese car brand

- Product type: Automobile brand
- Current owner: SAIC-GM-Wuling; Huawei (Yinwang)
- Country: China
- Introduced: 2026
- Markets: China
- Website: huajing.com.cn

Huajing (Chinese: 华境) is a Chinese hybrid car brand based in Liuzhou, operating since 2026. It belongs to the Sino-American joint-venture SGMW.

== History ==
At the end of December 2025, the joint venture SGMW announced the debut of its first car developed from scratch in cooperation with Yinwang, one of the automotive branches of the Chinese technology company Huawei. At that time, the car, in the form of a large, luxurious SUV with a hybrid drive, was to join the range of the already existing Baojun brand. Ultimately, during the market debut, the creation of a new, separate Huajing brand was announced, emphasizing the impact of the partnership with Huawei on, among other things, the vehicle's software. The first product, Huajing S, will be sold exclusively in the domestic Chinese market starting in April 2026.

== Products ==
- Huajing S (2026–present), full-size SUV, PHEV
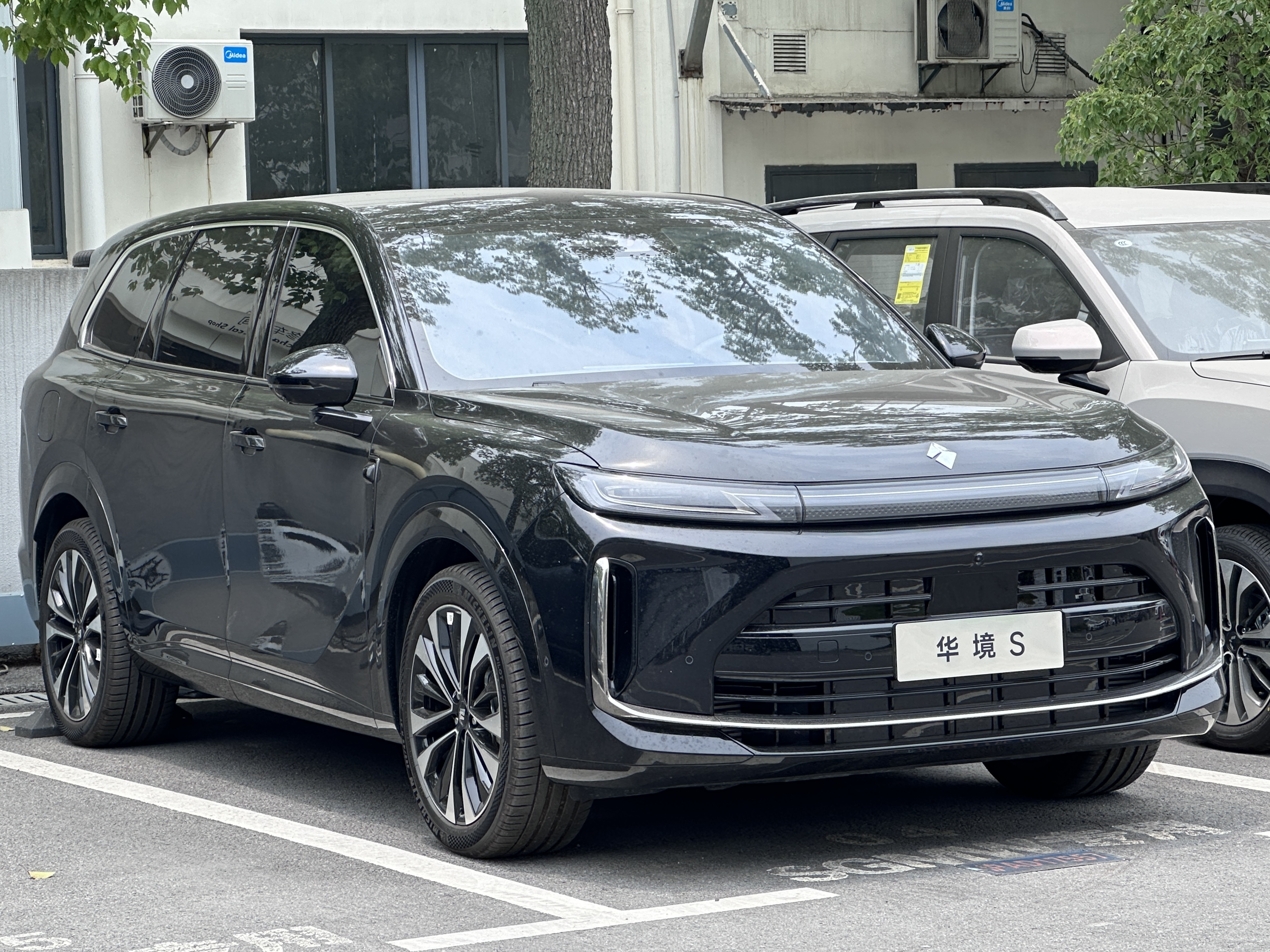
Huajing S
