= AITO M7 =

Full-size luxury SUV

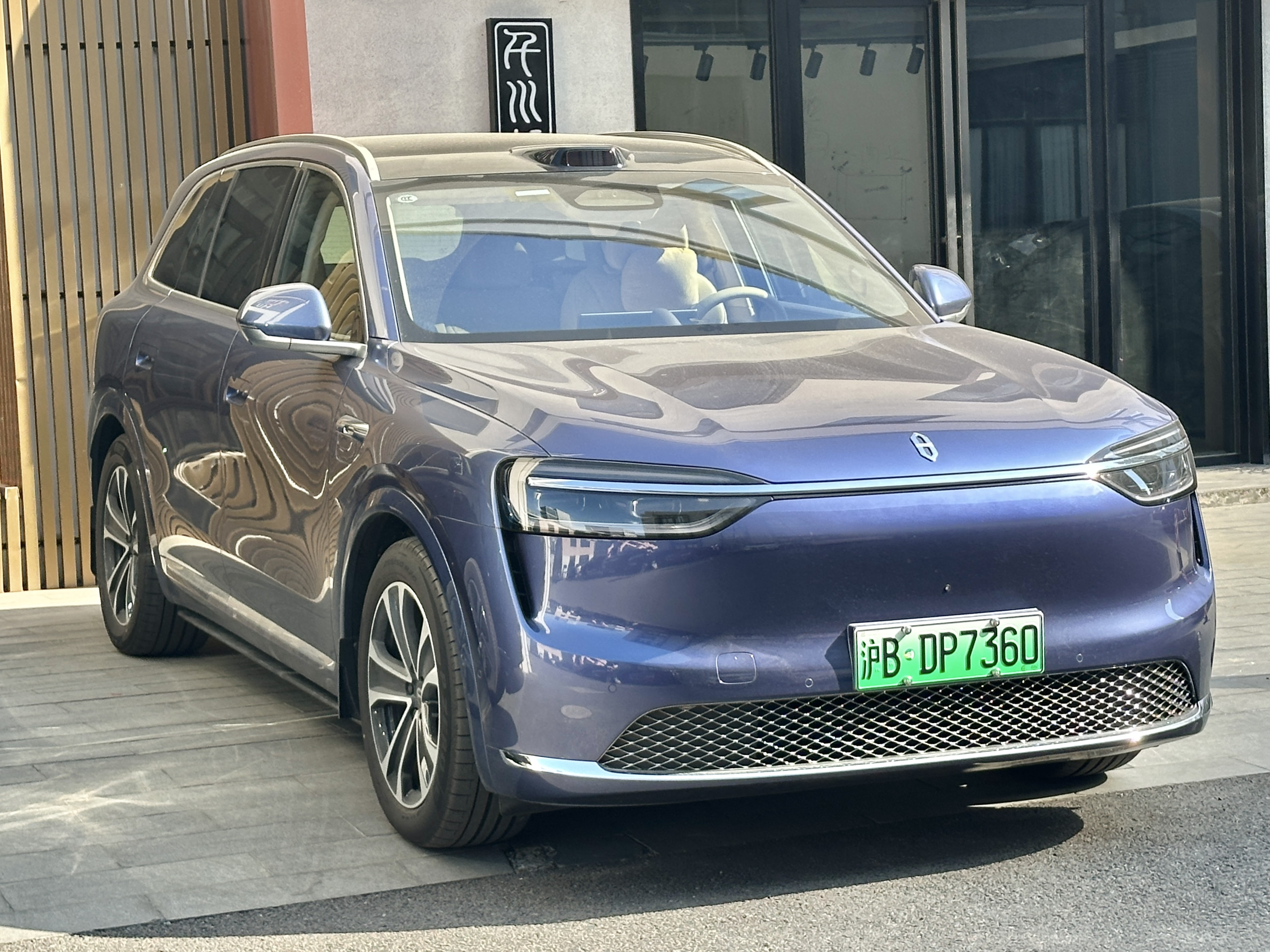

Overview
- Manufacturer: Seres Auto
- Production: 2022–present
- Assembly: China: Chongqing

Body and chassis
- Class: Full-size luxury SUV
- Body style: 5-door SUV

The AITO M7 (Chinese: 问界M7; pinyin: Wènjiè M7) is a full-size luxury SUV produced by Seres under the AITO brand in collaboration with Huawei from 2022. It is positioned between the AITO M6 and the AITO M8 SUVs. Since 2023, the M7 is included in the Harmony Intelligent Mobility Alliance (HIMA), a multi-brand collaboration model with Huawei.

Initially only available in range-extended form, the M7 is also available in battery electric form beginning with the second generation.

== First generation (2022) ==
First generation
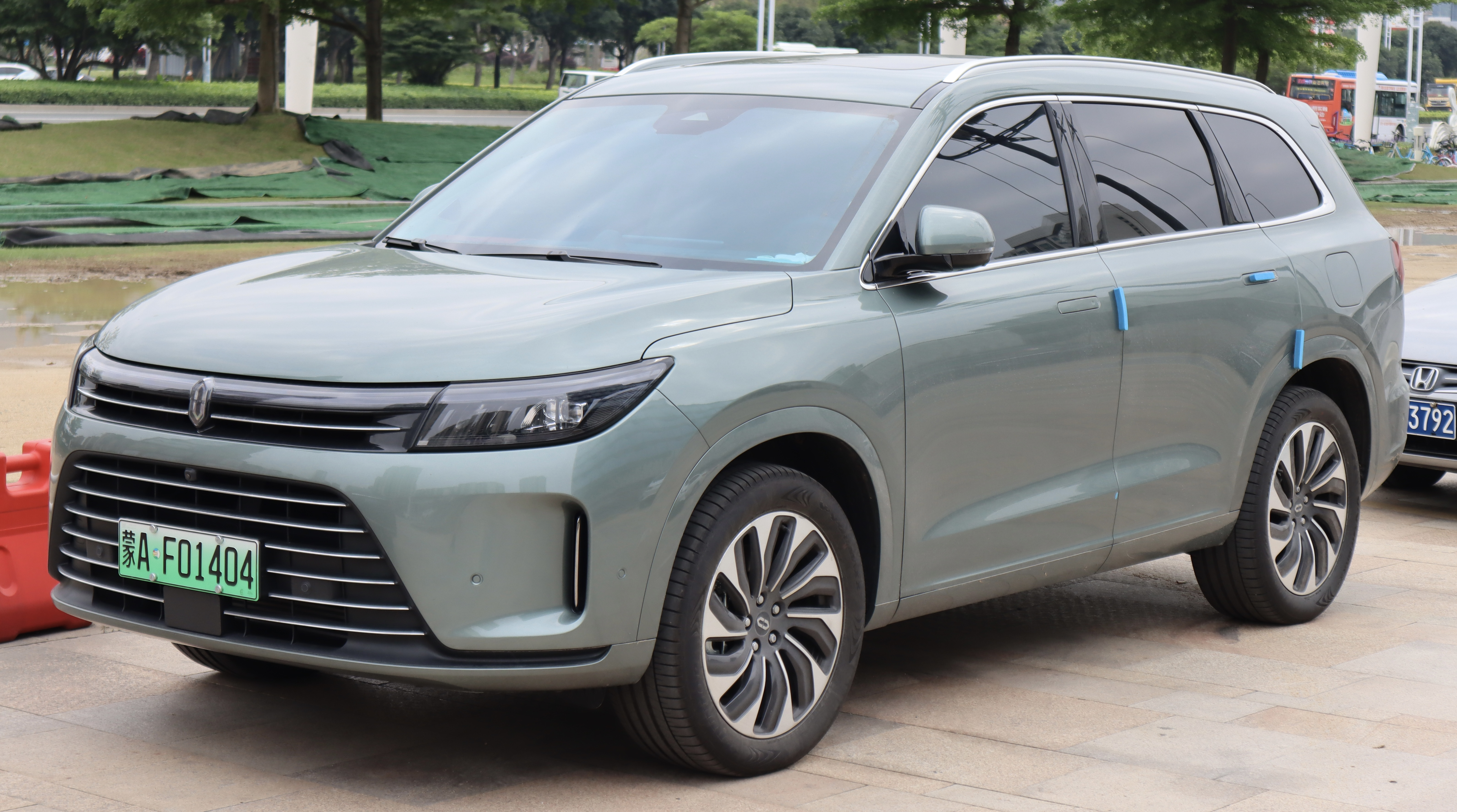

Overview
- Also called: Seres 7 (export); Seres M7 (Russia)
- Production: 2022–2025 (China); 2023–present (export)
- Assembly: China: Chongqing

Body and chassis
- Layout: Front-engine, rear-motor, rear-wheel drive; Front-engine, dual-motor, all-wheel drive
- Related: Fengon ix7

Powertrain
- Engine: Petrol range extender: 1.5 L SFG15TR/H15RT turbo I4
- Electric motor: PMSM
- Power output: 268–443 hp (200–330 kW; 272–449 PS)
- Hybrid drivetrain: Range extender series plug-in hybrid
- Battery: 38.5 kWh LFP CATL; 40.06 kWh NMC CATL
- Electric range: 135–200 km (84–124 mi) (WLTP); 200–240 km (120–150 mi) (CLTC)
- Plug-in charging: DC: 100 kW

Dimensions
- Wheelbase: 2,820 mm (111.0 in)
- Length: 5,020 mm (197.6 in)
- Width: 1,945 mm (76.6 in)
- Height: 1,775 mm (69.9 in)
- Curb weight: 2,340 kg (5,159 lb)

The AITO M7 is a 5-seater, two-row (since 2023) or 6-seater, three-row range-extender electric SUV. The second row comes with Zero Gravity Seats which unfold to offer a more comfortable position for passengers. AITO claims that by bringing knees and hips to the same level and ensuring the angle between thighs and torso is precisely at 113 degrees, they could improve the blood circulation. The sound system in the M7 is provided by Huawei and comes with 19 speakers in 7.1 surround sound setup.

In March 2023, the AITO M7 was briefly rebranded as Huawei AITO M7 before Yu Chengdong, a Huawei executive issued that all promotional materials related to Huawei will be removed on April 1 from AITO stores.

The front of the M7 features large air curtain vents on the front bumper and retracting door handles. Aito says the M7 has a 422 mm (16.6 in) L113 measurement, which is significantly shorter than German luxury competitors and when combined with the compact 6-in-1 generator unit, allows the M7 to achieve a higher space utilization rate of 92.4% by lengthening the passenger compartment to 2,605 mm (102.6 in).

It is equipped with soft-close doors, double-glazed noise insulating front and side windows, low-noise tires, and an active noise cancellation system. Aito says that 32% of the chassis consists of 340–780 MPa (49–113 ksi) high-strength steel and 16% 1,500 MPa (220 ksi) ultra high-strength hot-formed steel.

The dashboard features a 10.25-inch digital instrument cluster and a 15.6-inch 2K-resolution HDR central infotainment touchscreen equipped with Huawei's HarmonyOS infotainment software, which allows for the elimination of all physical buttons from the front, though the steering wheel retains physical buttons and control stalks and the door retains mirror controls. The air vents are controlled through the infotainment screen, and the center console features dual active-cooled 40-watt wireless charging pads and 66-watt USB-C power outlets, a crystal-effect rocker type shifter, and split-opening doors for the storage bin.

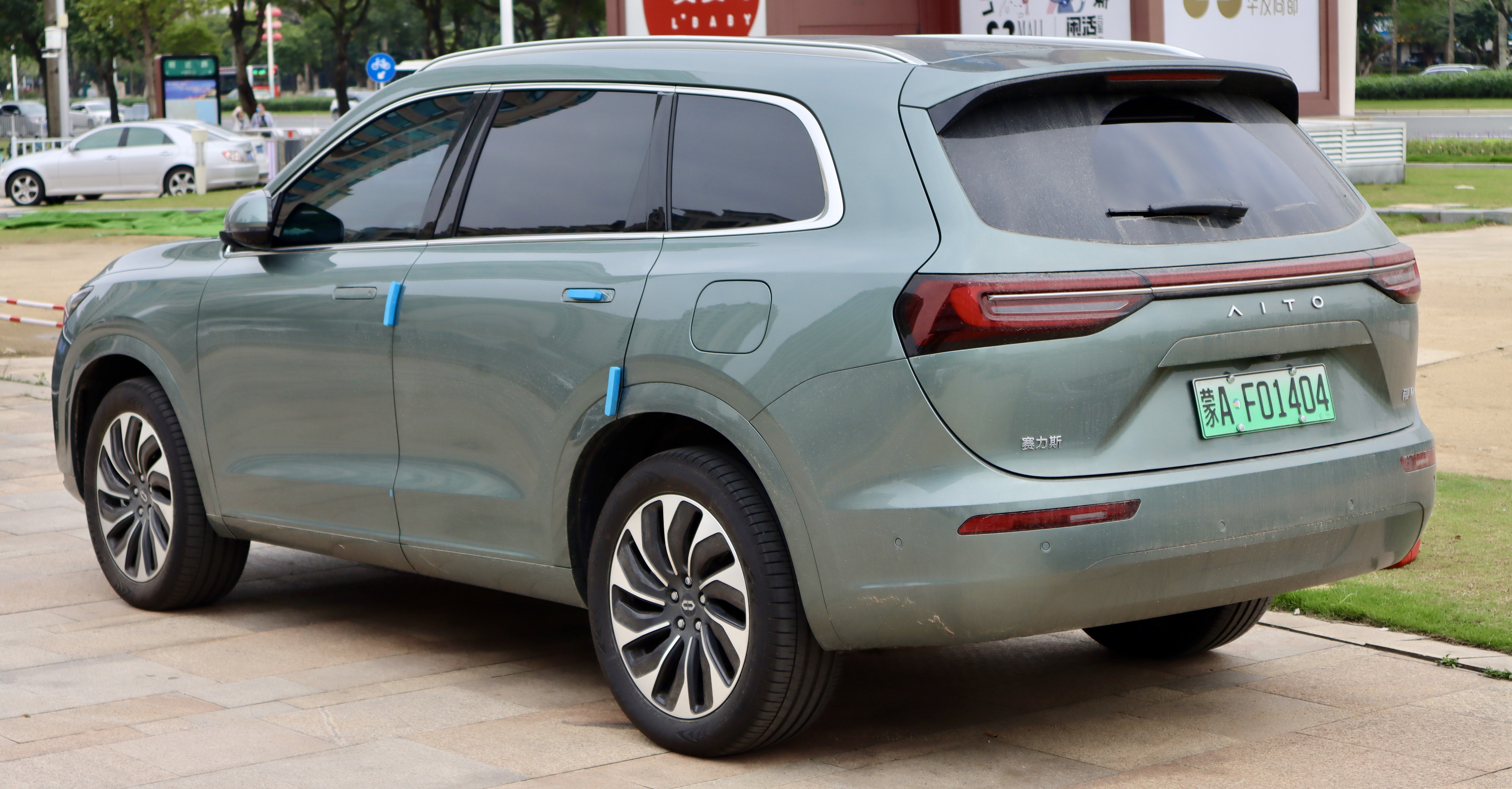
Rear view

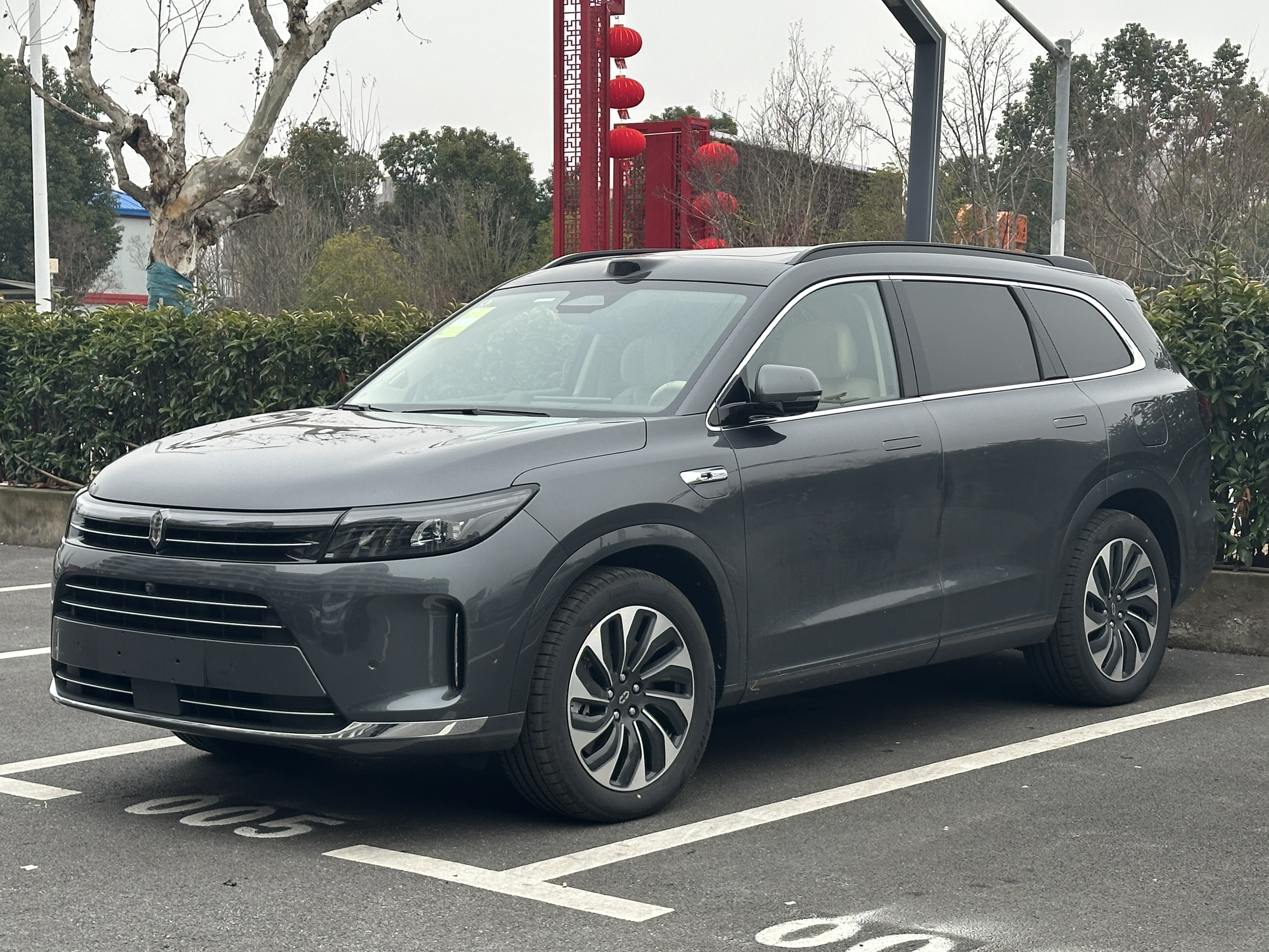
2023 (facelift)

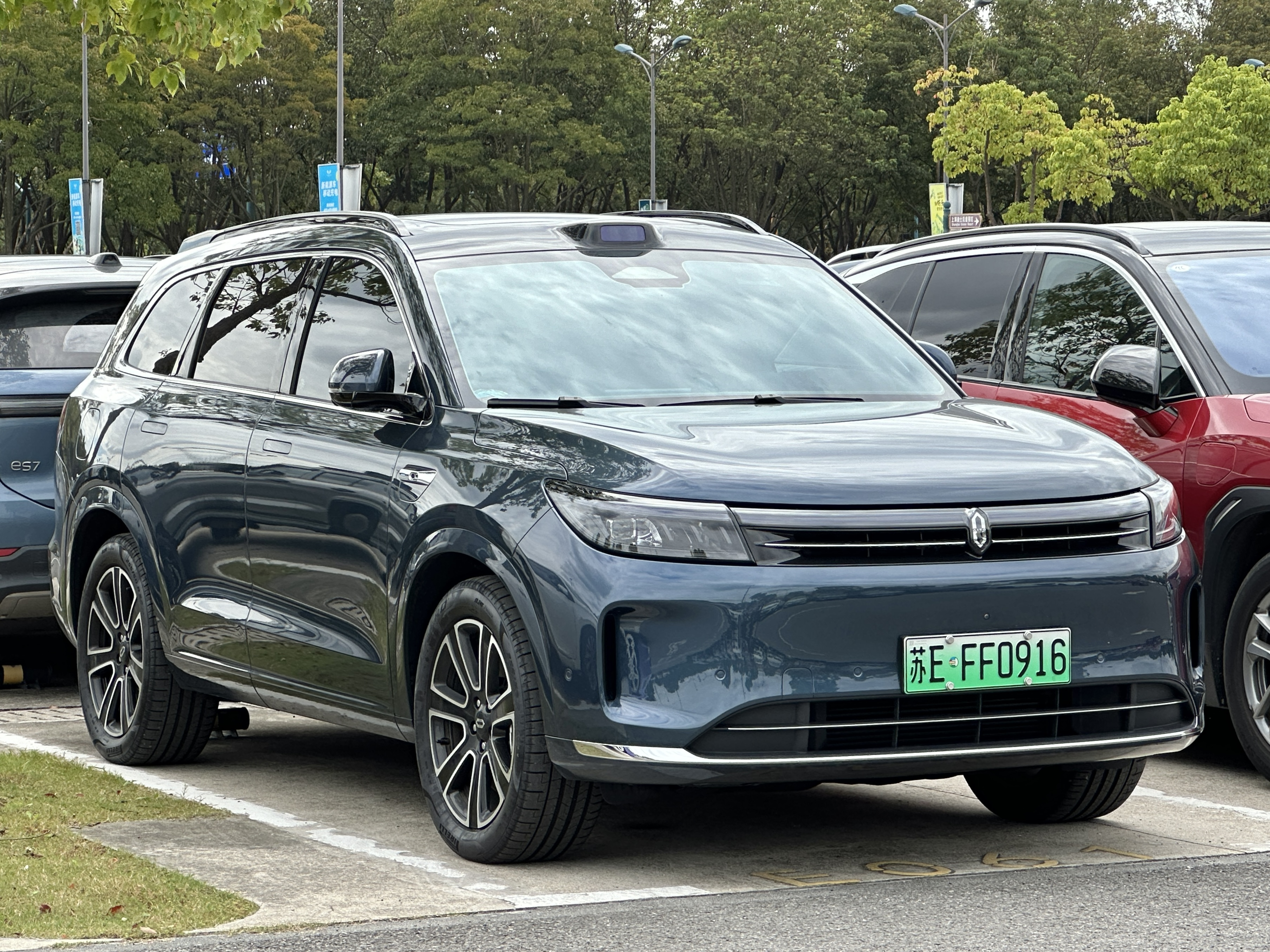
2024 (facelift)

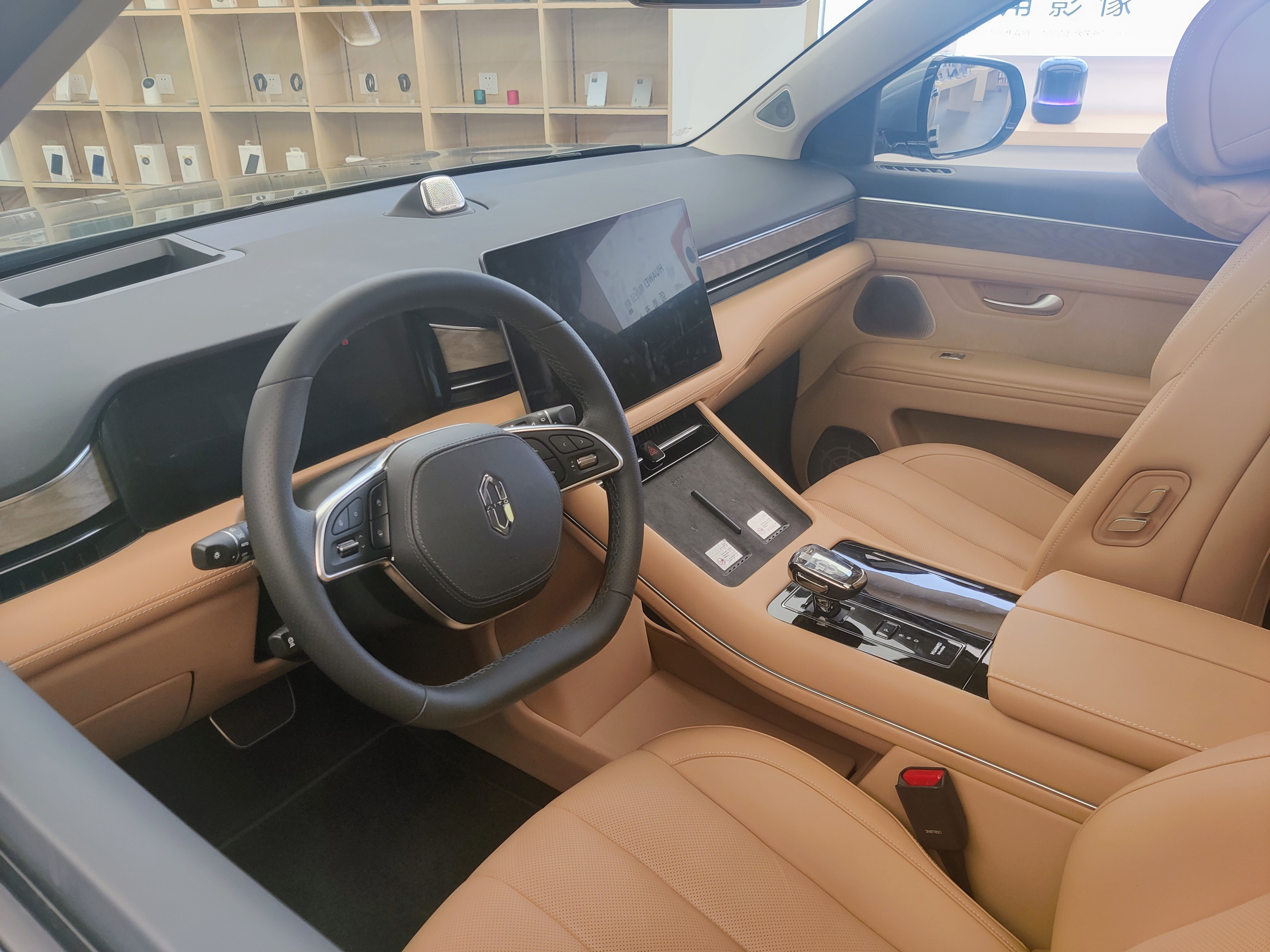
Interior

=== 2023 facelift ===
The M7 received a facelift which launched on 12 September 2023 which features a new two-row five-seater configuration alongside three-row six-seater variants. The exterior receives minor updates, including a new front grille and headlights, and the height has been lowered by 15 mm (0.59 in). Max variants are also equipped with active grille shutters. The rear cargo area of the five-seater variant measures 686 litres (24.2 cu ft) and 1,100 mm (43.3 in) in length, and expands to 1,619 litres (57.2 cu ft) with the rear seats folded down.

The ADAS system has been updated to the Huawei Qiankun ADS 2.0 system, which has a sensor suite consisting of a 126-line roof-mounted LiDAR with a maximum range of 150 m (490 ft), 3 mmWave radars, 11 cameras, and 12 ultrasonic sensors, and is capable of L2 assisted driving in highway and urban conditions without the use of high-definition maps.

The M7 receives an updated engine with higher power output, and the WLTP electric range increases to up to 200 kilometres (124 mi) while using the same battery pack and motors.

=== 2024 facelift ===
The updated version of the M7, known as the M7 Ultra, began pre-sales on 18 May 2024 and was launched on 31 May 2024 before it began deliveries on 2 June 2024. The exterior has been updated with a new front grille, new paint colors and wheel options. The interior receives minor updates including rear seatback MagLink mounts for 13.2-inch tablets, optimizations to the seats in six-seater variants which raises the third row's seat height by 5 mm (0.20 in) while also providing 5 mm (0.20 in) additional headroom and 10 mm (0.39 in) additional legroom, and new color options.

The ADAS system has been updated to use the Huawei Qiankun ADS 2.0 Ultra system, which uses a sensor suite consisting of a 192-line roof-mounted LiDAR with a maximum range of 250 m (820 ft), 3 mmWave radars, 11 cameras, and 12 ultrasonic sensors, and is capable of L2 assisted driving in highway and urban conditions.

The powertrain remains unchanged and now provides WLTP electric range of up to 175 kilometres (109 mi).

Later on 26 August 2024, the Pro variant of the M7 was launched to offer lower prices. It uses the lower end Qiankun ADS 3 SE ADAS system, which removes the LiDAR and one camera compared to the Ultra variant resulting in downgraded ADAS capabilities such as only being capable of L2 assisted driving in highway conditions and lower AEB speed ranges. It also uses a new marginally smaller LFP battery pack alongside the same motors and engine to provide up to 190 kilometres (118 mi) of WLTP electric range.

=== Seres 7 ===
In September 2023, Seres announced the Seres 7 at the Munich Auto Show, which is rebadged from the AITO M7. Due to the sensitivity of Huawei brand in the western market, Seres removed all the Huawei logos and traces on the hardware and software of the original AITO M7.

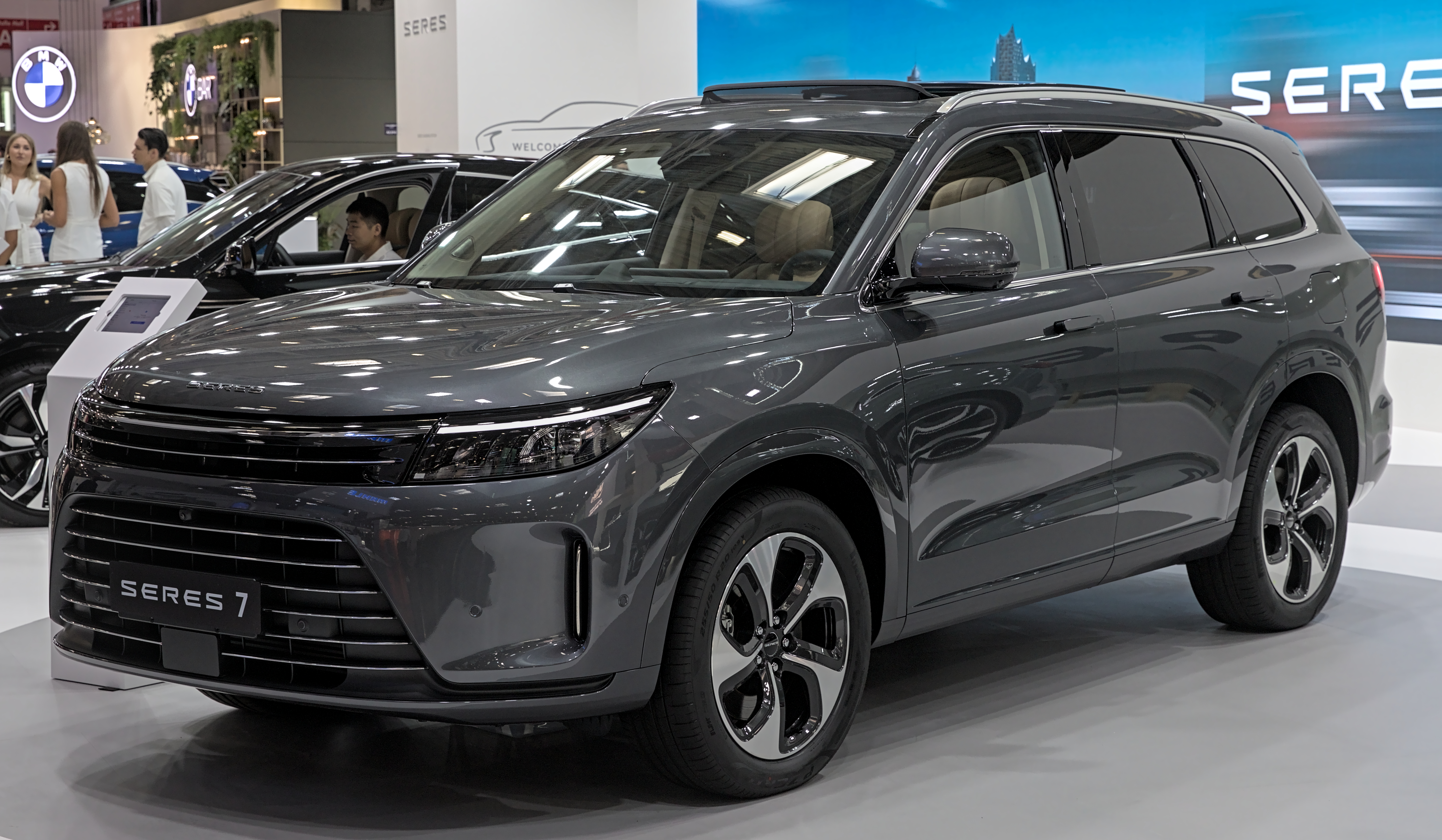
Seres 7

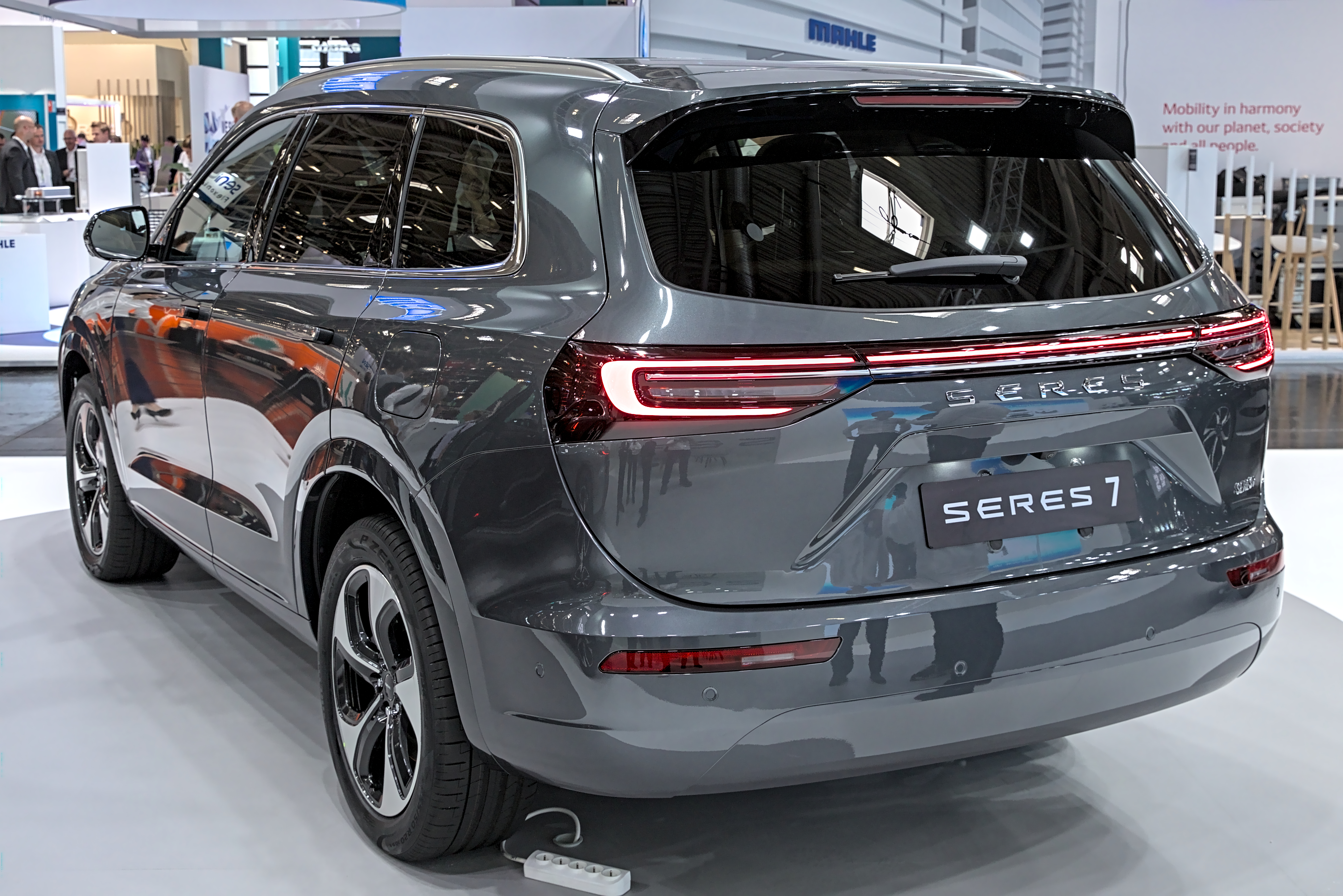
Rear view

=== Specifications ===
The AITO M7 is based on the modified platform design of the Fengon ix7 which also shares the same platform as the Fengon 580.

It uses a 1.5-liter turbocharged inline-4 petrol engine in Miller cycle with a bore and stroke of 73.5 mm × 88.32 mm (2.894 in × 3.477 in) and compression ratio of 15:1 with port injection, and outputs 121 hp (90 kW; 123 PS) (123 hp (92 kW; 125 PS) gross) and 205 N⋅m (151 lb⋅ft) of torque.

The rear-wheel-drive version of the AITO M7 a 200 kW (268 hp; 272 PS) Huawei DriveONE electric motor with 360 N⋅m (266 lb⋅ft) of torque. The four-wheel-drive model adds a 130 kW (174 hp; 177 PS) front motor for greater traction and can accelerate from 0 to 100 km/h (0 to 62 mph) in 4.8 seconds with the combined output of 455 PS; 335 kW (449 hp) and 660 N⋅m (487 lb⋅ft).

All variants use a 40 kWh NMC battery capable of recharging from 30–80% in 30 minutes, and in the rear-wheel-drive AITO M7 it offers a WLTP electric range of 150 kilometres (93 mi) compared to the 135 kilometres (84 mi) of the four-wheel-drive model. Combined, the rear-wheel model has a range of 1,220 kilometres (758 mi) on full fuel and full charge and the four-wheel-drive M7 model delivers an overall range of 1,100 kilometres (684 mi).

For 2023, the engine was updated and output is raised to 148 hp (110 kW; 150 PS) (150 hp (112 kW; 152 PS) gross) at 5,400rpm and 216 N⋅m (159 lb⋅ft) of torque at 4,000rpm. It features low-pressure EGR, intake VVT, and an electric water pump. The motors and battery remain unchanged, but WLTP electric range increases to 200 and 175 kilometres (124 and 109 mi) for rear- and all-wheel drive models, respectively. Additionally, Max models are equipped with active grille shutters, which offset the additional drag of their roof-mounted LiDAR sensor.

For 2024, the refreshed Ultra variant with the same battery but marketed as 42 kWh has lower WLTP electric range of 175 and 162 kilometres (109 and 101 mi) for rear and all-wheel drive, respectively. Additionally, a new Pro variant was added which is equipped with a 38.5 kWh LFP battery pack which is capable of recharging from 30–80% in 18 minutes. It uses the same motors and engine but has slower acceleration times. It is capable of WLTP electric range of 190 and 170 kilometres (118 and 106 mi) for the rear and all-wheel drive variants, respectively.

=== Powertrain ===
Specifications
Model	Battery		Engine	Motor		Electric range		Charging		0–100 km/h (62 mph)
Model	Type	Weight	Engine	Front	Rear	WLTP	CLTC	Peak	30–80%	0–100 km/h (62 mph)
2022 RWD	40 kWh (42 kWh) NMC CATL	258 kg (569 lb)	1.5 L H15RT I4 turbo 90 kW (122 PS; 121 hp)	—	200kW CTZ196XY0P4 PMSM	150 km (93 mi)	230 km (143 mi)	100 kW	30 min	7.8 s
2022 AWD	40 kWh (42 kWh) NMC CATL	258 kg (569 lb)	1.5 L H15RT I4 turbo 90 kW (122 PS; 121 hp)	130 kW HFE30A31 PMSM	200kW CTZ196XY0P4 PMSM	135 km (84 mi)	200 km (124 mi)	100 kW	30 min	4.8 s
2023 Plus, Max RWD	40 kWh (42 kWh) NMC CATL	258 kg (569 lb)	1.5 L H15RT I4 turbo 110 kW (150 PS; 148 hp)	—	200kW CTZ196XY0P4 PMSM	200 km (124 mi)	240 km (149 mi)	100 kW	30 min	7.8 s
2024 Ultra RWD	40 kWh (42 kWh) NMC CATL	258 kg (569 lb)	1.5 L H15RT I4 turbo 110 kW (150 PS; 148 hp)	—	200kW CTZ196XY0P4 PMSM	175 km (109 mi)	240 km (149 mi)	100 kW	30 min	7.8 s
2023 Plus, Max AWD	40 kWh (42 kWh) NMC CATL	258 kg (569 lb)	1.5 L H15RT I4 turbo 110 kW (150 PS; 148 hp)	130 kW HFE30A31 PMSM	200kW CTZ196XY0P4 PMSM	175 km (109 mi)	210 km (130 mi)	100 kW	30 min	4.8 s
2024 Ultra AWD	40 kWh (42 kWh) NMC CATL	258 kg (569 lb)	1.5 L H15RT I4 turbo 110 kW (150 PS; 148 hp)	130 kW HFE30A31 PMSM	200kW CTZ196XY0P4 PMSM	162 km (101 mi)	210 km (130 mi)	100 kW	30 min	4.8 s
2024 Pro RWD	38.5 kWh LFP CATL	280 kg (617 lb)	1.5 L H15RT I4 turbo 110 kW (150 PS; 148 hp)	—	200kW CTZ196XY0P4 PMSM	190 km (118 mi)	230 km (143 mi)	—	18 min	8.2 s
2024 Pro AWD	38.5 kWh LFP CATL	280 kg (617 lb)	1.5 L H15RT I4 turbo 110 kW (150 PS; 148 hp)	130 kW HFE30A31 PMSM	200kW CTZ196XY0P4 PMSM	170 km (106 mi)	200 km (124 mi)	—	18 min	5.2 s

=== Safety ===
The C-IASI (China Insurance Automotive Safety Index) crash test results for the entry level rear-wheel drive version of the M7 were released in November 2022. It received the top 'G' (Good) rating for Occupant Safety, Pedestrian Safety, Active Safety, and all subscores under those categories. It received an 'M' (Marginal) rating for the Crashworthiness and Repair Economy category, with 'M' ratings for the Structural Crashworthiness, Repairability, and Maintenance Economy subcategories, and 'A' (Acceptable) for the Crash Compatibility subcategory. In the 64 km/h (40 mph) 25% frontal offset collision, some deformation of the A-pillar was observed.

== Second generation (2025) ==
Second generation
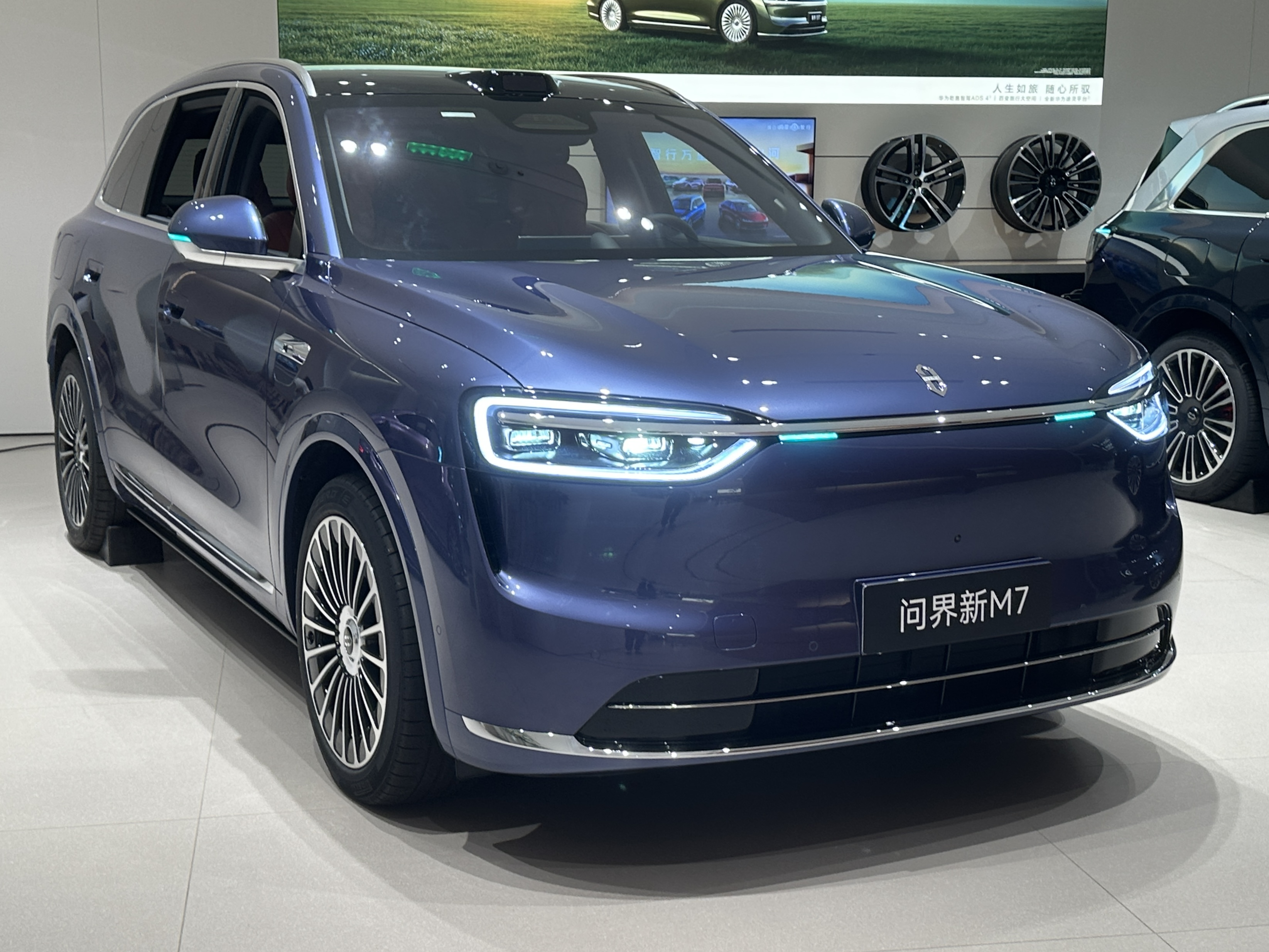
- The AITO M7 with its teal autonomous driving indicator lights on

Overview
- Production: 2025–present
- Assembly: China: Chongqing

Body and chassis
- Platform: Seres MF Platform
- Related: AITO M6; AITO M8; AITO M9

Powertrain
- Engine: Petrol range extender: 1.5 L HG15T turbo I4
- Electric motor: 227 kW PMSM, 160-165 kW AC induction
- Power output: 304–526 hp (227–392 kW; 308–533 PS)
- Hybrid drivetrain: Range extender series plug-in hybrid
- Battery: 37 kWh LFP CATL; 53.4 kWh NMC CATL; 100 kWh NMC CATL
- Range: 1,350–1,690 km (840–1,050 mi) (EREV, CLTC)
- Electric range: 175–255 km (109–158 mi) (EREV, WLTP); 208–327 km (129–203 mi) (EREV, CLTC); 635–710 km (395–441 mi) (EV, CLTC)

Dimensions
- Wheelbase: 3,030 mm (119.3 in)
- Length: 5,080 mm (200.0 in)
- Width: 1,999 mm (78.7 in)
- Height: 1,780 mm (70.1 in)
- Curb weight: 2,530–2,680 kg (5,578–5,908 lb)

On July 28, 2025, HIMA released official photos of the second generation AITO M7's design. The second generation M7 was officially launched on September 23, 2025.

More than three years after the debut of the AITO M7, the manufacturer decided to replace the existing model with an entirely new, second generation model. The new exterior design is closely related to the slightly larger M8, gaining similarly chunkier and stockier body proportions with a distinctive truncated front fascia and high-set headlights connected by a light bar. The rear section, in turn, gains sleeker, narrow lamps created by a strip running the full width of the body, accented with chrome.

The interior features a luxurious loft-style layout, with the cockpit dominated by a centrally located 16.1-inch touchscreen for controlling the multimedia system. Two further screens are located in front of both the driver and front passenger. The high tunnel is equipped not only with a storage compartment but also a refrigerator. Additional screens are also located on the first-row backrests for rear passengers. It is available in 2-row 5-seater or 3-row 6-seater configurations.

The M7 is equipped with Huawei's ADS 4 ADAS system available in two tiers. The base specification sees the debut of Huawei's Limera in-cabin LiDAR sensor, which is mounted in a module underneath the windshield behind the rearview mirror rather than the traditional position atop the roof in a bump. Huawei claims the Limera sensor can detect objects as small as 30 cm (12 in) at nighttime and allows the automatic emergency braking system to function at up to 100 km/h (62 mph). Listed advantages also include lower cost, improved aesthetics from its concealed positioning, and protection from environmental elements with the option of using the windshield wipers to clear debris. Huawei says that the Limera sensor will be used in ADAS systems which would otherwise be 'camera-only', which normally struggle in low-light conditions due to the lack of LiDAR. Higher specifications continue to use a traditional external roof-mounted 192-line LiDAR sensor, a rear-facing solid-state LiDAR, and 5 4D mmWave radars.

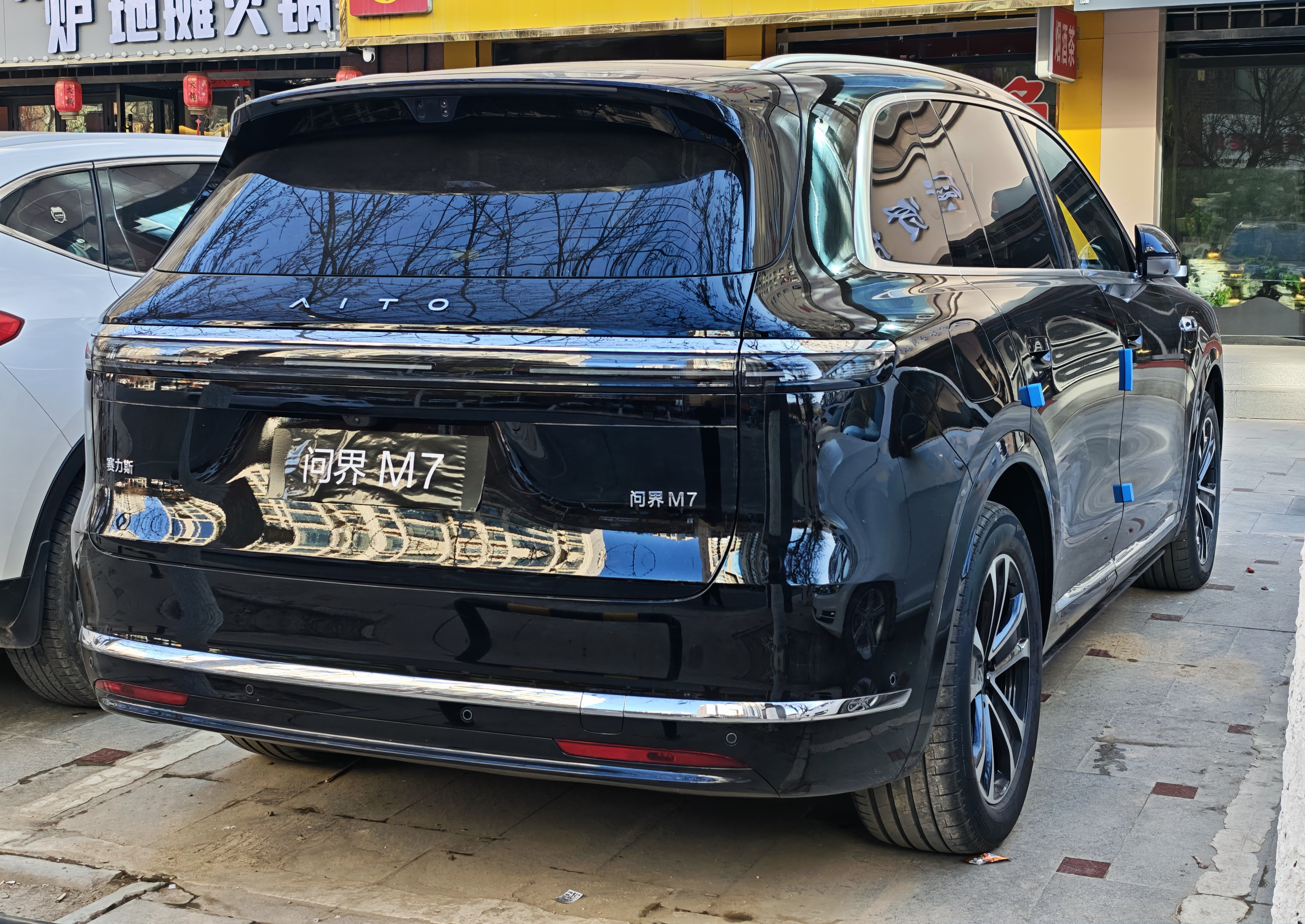
Rear view

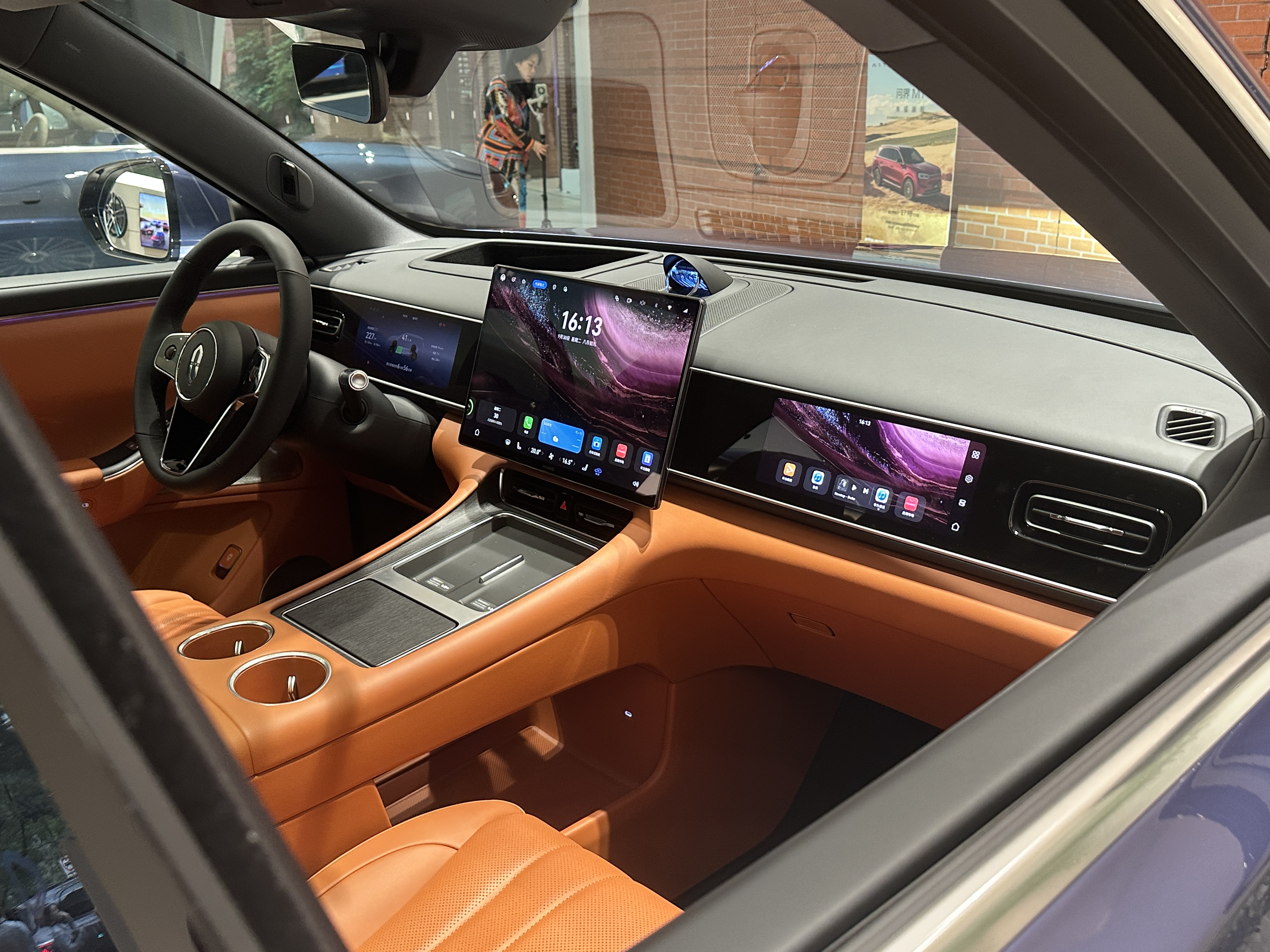
Interior

=== Specifications ===
The second generation M7 is available with both range-extender and full-electric powertrains. All versions use a 227 kW (304 hp; 309 PS) Huawei DriveONE permanent magnet synchronous motor codenamed QT67TZ210D01 on the rear axle with 320 N⋅m (236 lb⋅ft) of torque, and use Huawei's Jujing battery packs supplied by CATL.

The range extender version is equipped with a Seres 1.5-liter turbocharged direct-injected inline-four petrol engine outputting 154 hp (115 kW; 156 PS) (158 hp (118 kW; 160 PS) gross). All-wheel drive models are equipped with an additional 165 kW (221 hp; 224 PS) with 243 N⋅m (179 lb⋅ft) of torque AC induction motor on the front axle, for a total of 526 hp (392 kW; 533 PS) and 563 N⋅m (415 lb⋅ft) of torque. It is available with either a 37 kWh LFP pack with a CLTC electric range of 175 km (109 mi), or a 53.4 kWh NMC pack with an electric range of 255 km (158 mi), and combined range between 1,350–1,625 km (839–1,010 mi) depending on the configuration.

The pure electric version of the M7 is exclusively available with a 100 kWh NMC pack. The rear-wheel drive version has a CLTC range of 710 km (441 mi), and the AWD version, which adds a 160 kW (215 hp; 218 PS) AC induction motor to the front axle for a total of 519 hp (387 kW; 526 PS) and 277 N⋅m (204 lb⋅ft) of torque, has a range of 635–660 km (395–410 mi).

Specifications
Drivetrain	Battery		Petrol Engine	Total power	Electric range		0–100 km/h (62 mph)	Top speed	Kerb weight
Drivetrain	Type	Weight	Petrol Engine	Total power	WLTP	CLTC	0–100 km/h (62 mph)	Top speed	Kerb weight
EREV
AWD	37 kWh LFP	280 kg (617 lb)	1.5 L HG15T I4 turbo 115 kW (156 PS; 154 hp)	526 hp (392 kW; 533 PS)	175 km (109 mi)	208 km (129 mi)	5.2 s	200 km/h (124 mph)	2,600 kg (5,730 lb)
AWD	53.4 kWh NMC	258 kg (569 lb)	1.5 L HG15T I4 turbo 115 kW (156 PS; 154 hp)	526 hp (392 kW; 533 PS)	255 km (158 mi)	315 km (196 mi)	5.1 s	200 km/h (124 mph)	2,680 kg (5,910 lb)
RWD	53.4 kWh NMC	258 kg (569 lb)	1.5 L HG15T I4 turbo 115 kW (156 PS; 154 hp)	304 hp (227 kW; 308 PS)	265 km (165 mi)	327 km (203 mi)	8.2 s	190 km/h (118 mph)	2,540 kg (5,600 lb)
BEV
RWD	100 kWh NMC	518 kg (1,142 lb)	—	304 hp (227 kW; 308 PS)	—	710 km (441 mi)	7.8 s	200 km/h (124 mph)	2,530 kg (5,580 lb)
AWD Max	100 kWh NMC	518 kg (1,142 lb)	—	519 hp (387 kW; 526 PS)	—	660 km (410 mi)	4.7 s	200 km/h (124 mph)	2,635 kg (5,810 lb)
AWD Ultra	100 kWh NMC	518 kg (1,142 lb)	—	519 hp (387 kW; 526 PS)	—	635 km (395 mi)	4.7 s	200 km/h (124 mph)	2,635 kg (5,810 lb)

=== Safety ===
C-NCAP test results Aito M7 Max 5-seater Electric Long Range
Category		%
Overall:	5.5 /5 stars	95.0%
Occupant protection:		98.13%
Vulnerable road users:		86.22%
Active safety:		97.54%

== Sales ==
=== First generation ===
The M7 received over 10,000 pre-orders within 2 hours of opening on 4 July 2022, and over 20,000 within 4 hours.

The facelifted M7 received over 15,000 pre-orders within 24 hours of the pre-sales period opening on 3 September 2023. It exceeded 15,000 firm orders in 24 hours after its launch on 12 September 2023, 30,000 in 18 days, 50,000 in 23 days, 60,000 in one month, over 80,000 after 50 days, 100,000 in 2.5 months, and over 130,000 in four months. Aito says that at the 50,000 milestone, over 81% of orders were for the five-seater and 19% were for the six-seater.

After the M7 Ultra launched on May 31 2024, Aito said it received over 6,000 firm orders within one hour.

=== Second generation ===
After pre-orders opened on September 5, 2025, the second generation M7 received over 20,000 orders in 10 minutes, 100,000 orders after 43 minutes, 150,000 orders within 24 hours, and 230,000 orders by the 23rd of that month. After the M7 launched on September 24, 2025, it received over 10,000 firm orders within 5 minutes and over 30,000 firm orders within one hour of its launch.

Year	China		
Year	EV	EREV	Total
2022	—	21,226	
2023	—	68,465	
2024	—	193,599	
2025	11,887	109,531	121,418

== Accidents ==
In January 2023, an AITO M7 owner in Hangzhou experienced a collision while driving, but the airbag did not deploy. The manufacturer claimed the vehicle conditions did not meet the criteria for airbag deployment. Later, both parties reached an agreement and the dealer replaced the vehicle with a new one for the owner. According to reports, while the owner was complaining to the manufacturer and before receiving a response, they received a phone call from their company leader saying "a leader approached us, asking to give face and let it go," suggesting their personal information had been leaked.

On the afternoon of April 26, 2024, an AITO M7 caught fire after a rear-end collision on a highway in Yuncheng, Shanxi Province. Due to the car doors being locked and unable to open, 3 people including the driver were trapped and burned to death. AITO stated that this vehicle was the Plus version without Huawei's intelligent driving assistance system, but still equipped with active safety features such as Forward Collision Warning (FCW) and Autonomous Emergency Braking (AEB); the vehicle was traveling at 115 km/h when the accident occurred, the airbags deployed normally, and the power battery pack characteristics were all normal. This accident sparked online discussion due to Huawei's aggressive promotion of AEB and other features as "far ahead" in earlier marketing. The victims' families posted questioning the vehicle's safety.; 21st Century Business Herald published a commentary article questioning whether Huawei's "far ahead" marketing claims were exaggerated. Subsequently, the victims' families deleted their posts and requested not to be disturbed, which raised external suspicions.; the aforementioned commentary article was also allegedly removed under pressure. On May 6, 2024, AITO responded to four questions regarding the accident, stating that the accident vehicle's airbags had deployed, the battery did not spontaneously combust, the car doors were severely damaged and could not be opened, and the vehicle's speed exceeded the AEB operating range, causing the AEB to be ineffective. Additionally, the driver's seat had a seatbelt buckle signal, while the passenger seat and all three rear seats had none.
