= Criticism of SUVs =

Problems with the automobile class

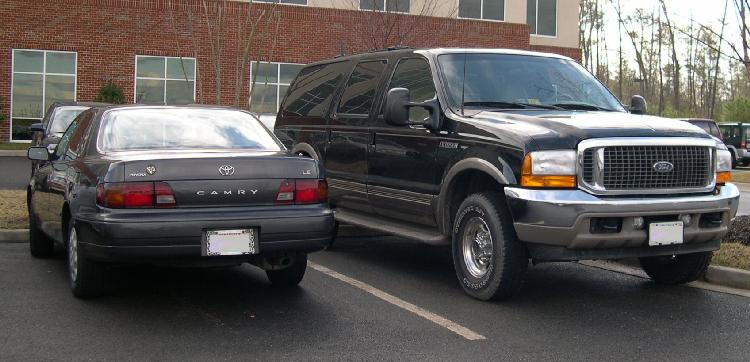
A Ford Excursion SUV next to a Toyota Camry compact

Sport utility vehicles (SUVs) have been criticized for a variety of environmental and automotive safety reasons. Their sales have increased in the USA, United Kingdom and the European Union. This has generated calls from car safety advocates to downsize in favor of models such as sedans, wagons, and compacts.

SUVs generally have poorer fuel efficiency and require more resources to manufacture than smaller vehicles, thus contributing more to climate change and environmental degradation.

Their higher center of gravity significantly increases their risk of rollovers, which was reduced by the introduction of rollover mitigation (Electronic Stability Control) in 2012. Their larger mass increases their momentum, which results in more damage to other road users in collisions. Their higher front-end profile reduces visibility and makes them at least twice as likely to kill pedestrians they hit. Large SUVs have been shown to have longer braking distances in the dry than traditional passenger cars and small SUVs. Additionally, the psychological sense of security they provide influences drivers to drive less cautiously or rely on their car for their perceived safety, rather than their own driving.

Because SUVs take up more space, they worsen traffic congestion and reduce parking availability. Their increased weight causes them to degrade roads faster, leading to increased civic maintenance costs.

== Safety ==
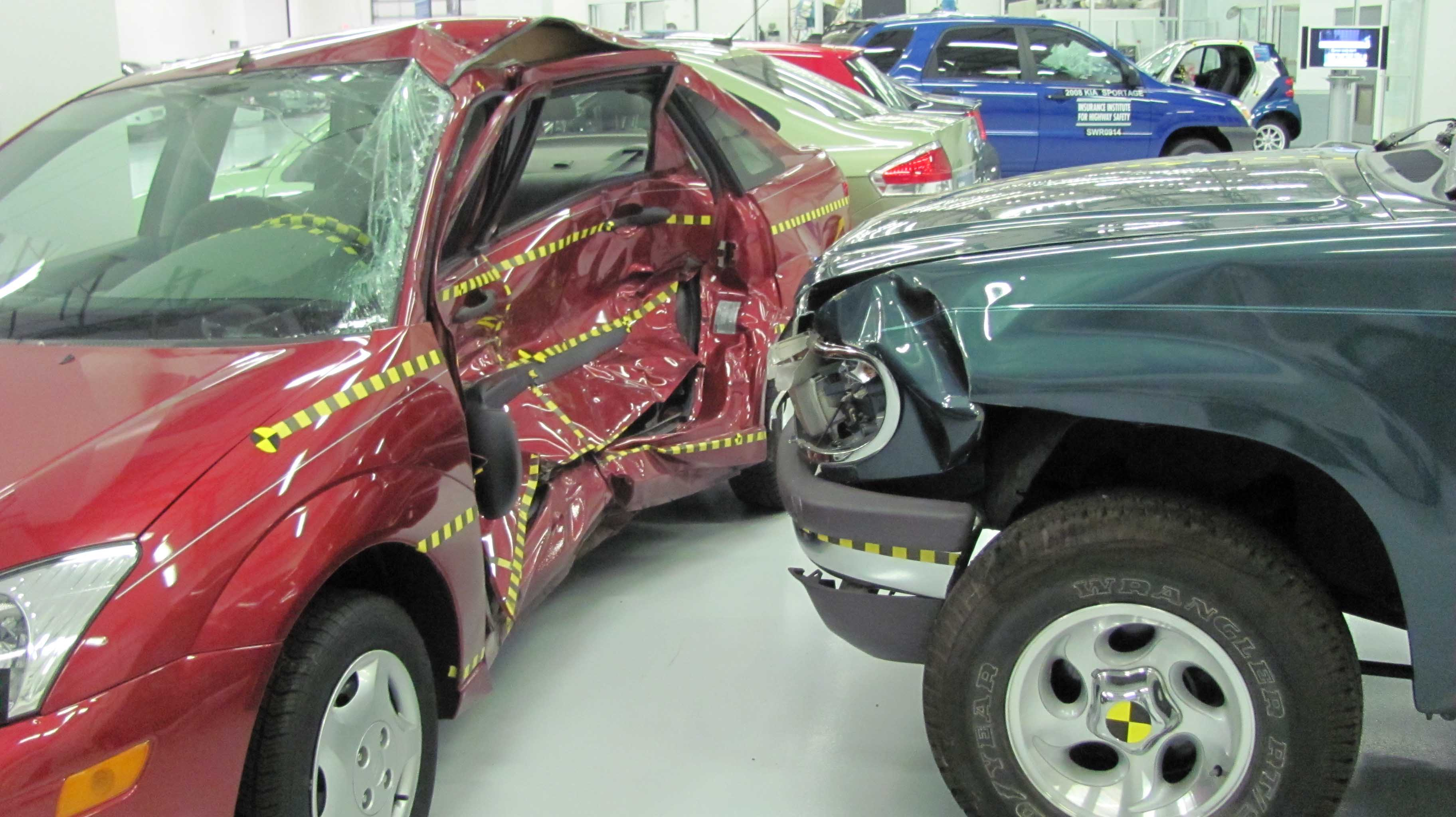
Side impact damage on a Ford Focus small car when struck by a Ford Explorer SUV

SUVs are generally safer to their occupants and more dangerous to other road users than mid-size cars. A 2021 study by the University of Illinois Springfield showed, for example, that SUVs are 8-times more likely to kill children in an accident than passenger cars, and multiple times more lethal to adult pedestrians and cyclists.

When it comes to mortality for vehicle occupants, four-door minicars have a death rate (per 100,000 registration years rather than mileage) of 82, compared with 46 for very large four-doors. This survey reflects the effects of both vehicle design and driving behaviour. Drivers of SUVs, minivans, and large cars may drive differently from the drivers of small or mid-size cars, and this may affect the survey result.

=== Rollover ===
A high center of gravity makes a vehicle more prone to rollover accidents than lower vehicles, especially if the vehicle leaves the road, or if the driver makes a sharp turn during an emergency maneuver. Figures from the US National Highway Traffic Safety Administration show that most passenger cars had about a 10% chance of rollover if involved in a single-vehicle crash, while SUVs had between 14% and 23% (varying from a low of 14% for the all-wheel-drive (AWD) Ford Edge to a high of 23% for the front-wheel-drive (FWD) Ford Escape). Many modern SUVs are equipped with electronic stability control (ESC) to prevent rollovers on flat surfaces, but 95% of rollovers are "tripped", meaning that the vehicle strikes something low, such as a curb or shallow ditch, causing it to tip over.

According to old NHTSA data, early SUVs were at a disadvantage in single-vehicle accidents (such as when the driver falls asleep or loses control swerving around a deer), which involve 43% of fatal accidents, with more than double the chance of rolling over. This risk related closely to overall US motor vehicle fatality data, showing that SUVs and pickups generally had a higher fatality rate than cars of the same manufacturer.

According to Consumer Reports, as of 2009, SUV rollover safety had improved to the extent that on average there were slightly fewer driver fatalities per million vehicles, due to rollovers, in SUVs as opposed to cars. By 2011 the IIHS reported that "drivers of today's SUVs are among the least likely to die in a crash".

=== Handling ===
Vehicles that are larger and heavier in size like SUVs require large amounts of braking power and more powerful steering assists to aid in turning the wheels more quickly. Large SUVs have been shown to have longer braking distances in the dry than traditional passenger cars and small SUVs.

=== Construction ===
Heavier-duty SUVs are typically designed with a truck-style chassis with separate body, while lighter-duty (including cross-over) models are more similar to cars, which are typically built with a unitary construction (in which the body actually forms the structure). Originally designed and built to be work vehicles using a truck chassis, SUVs were not comprehensively redesigned to be safely used as passenger vehicles. The British television programme Fifth Gear staged a 40 mph (64 km/h) crash between a first generation (1989–98) Land Rover Discovery with a separate chassis and body, and a modern Renault Espace IV with monocoque (unit) design. The older SUV offered less protection for occupants than the modern multi-purpose vehicle with unitary construction. In some SUV fatalities involving truck-based construction, lawsuits against the automakers "were settled quietly and confidentially, without any public scrutiny of the results—or the underlying problems with SUV design", thus hiding the danger of vehicles such as the Ford Bronco and Explorer compared to regular passenger cars.

=== Risk to other road users ===
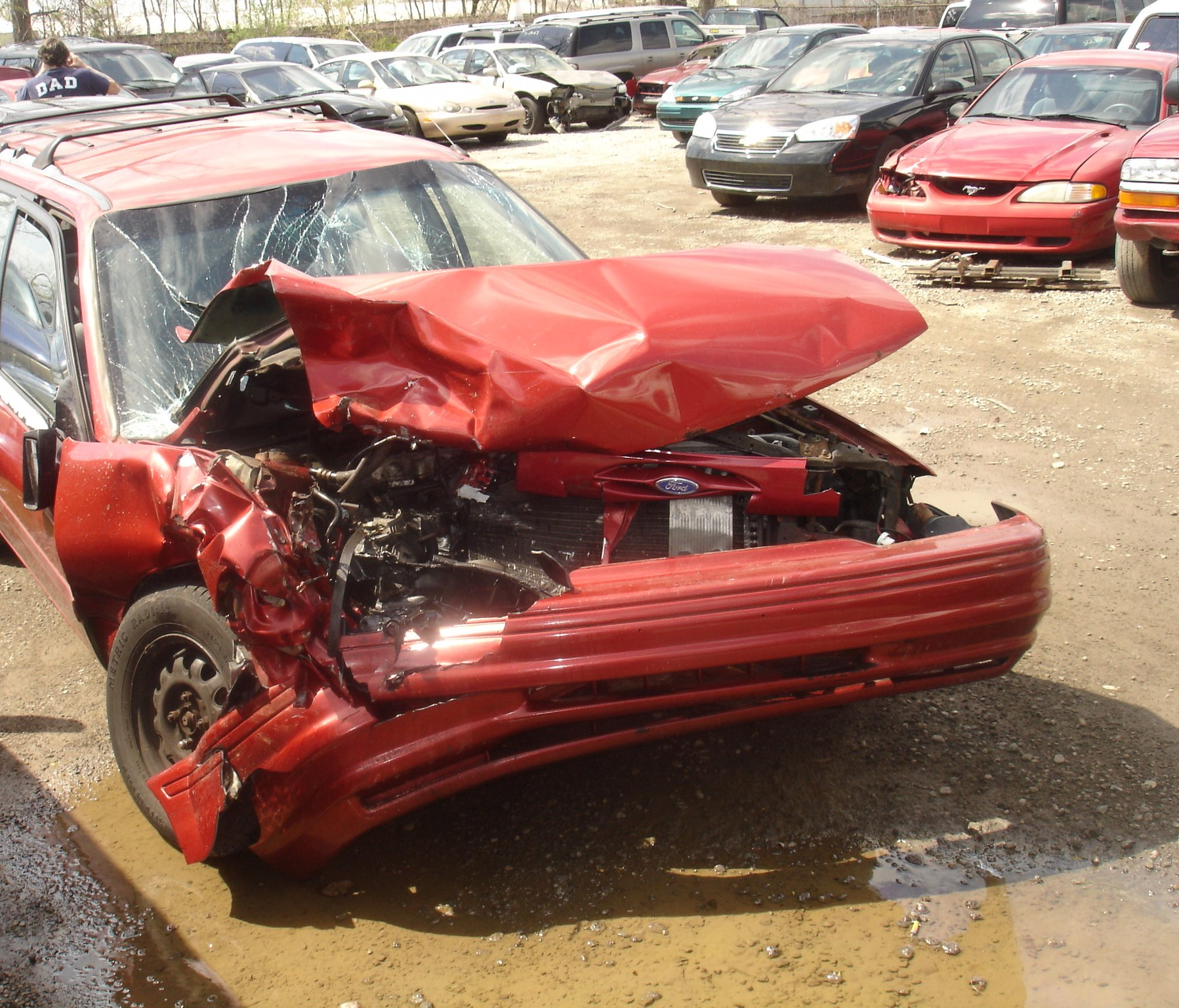
Ford Escort (North America) after a head-on collision with an SUV, showing the raised point of impact

Because of greater height and weight and rigid frames, it is contended by Malcolm Gladwell, writing in The New Yorker magazine, that SUVs can affect traffic safety. This height and weight, while potentially giving an advantage to occupants of the vehicle, may pose a risk to drivers of smaller vehicles in multi-vehicle accidents, particularly side impacts.

The initial tests of the Ford Excursion were "horrifying" for its ability to vault over the hood of a Ford Taurus. The big SUV was modified to include a type of blocker bar suggested by the French transportation ministry in 1971, a kind of under-vehicle roll bar designed to keep the large Ford Excursion from rolling over cars that were hit by it. The problem is "impact incompatibility", where the "hard points" of the end of chassis rails of SUVs are higher than the "hard points" of cars, causing the SUV to override the engine compartment and crumple zone of the car. There have been few regulations covering designs of SUVs to address the safety issue. The heavy weight is a risk factor with very large passenger cars, not only with SUVs. The typically higher SUV bumper heights and those built using stiff truck-based frames, also increases risks in crashes with passenger cars. The Mercedes ML320 was designed with bumpers at the same height as required for passenger cars.

In parts of Europe, effective 2006, the fitting of metal bullbars, also known as grille guards, brush guards, and push bars, to vehicles such as 4x4s and SUVs are only legal if pedestrian-safe plastic bars and grilles are used. Bullbars are often used in Australia, South Africa, and parts of the United States to protect the vehicle from being disabled should it collide with wildlife.

Safety improvements during the 2010s to the present led automobile manufacturers to make design changes to align the energy-absorbing structures of SUVs with those of cars. As a result, car occupants were only 28 percent more likely to die in collisions with SUVs than with cars between 2013 and 2016, compared with 59 percent between 2009 and 2012, according to the IIHS.

According to a 2025 systematic review and meta-analysis of more than 680,000 real-world collisions published in Injury Prevention, pedestrians and cyclists struck by an SUV or light truck vehicle had 44% higher odds of fatality than those struck by a passenger car. For children the increase was 82%; for children aged 0–9 it reached 130%. The odds of killed-or-seriously-injured outcomes rose by approximately 24-28%. The taller, blunter front-end profile was identified as the primary mechanism.

=== Visibility and backover deaths ===
Larger vehicles can create visibility problems for other road users by obscuring their view of traffic lights, signs, and other vehicles on the road, plus the road itself. Depending on the design, drivers of some larger vehicles may themselves suffer from poor visibility to the side and the rear. Poor rearward vision has led to many "backover deaths" where vehicles have run over small children when backing out of driveways. The problem of backover deaths has become so widespread that reversing cameras are being installed on some vehicles to improve rearward vision.

While SUVs are often perceived as having inferior rearward vision compared with regular passenger cars, this is not supported by controlled testing which found poor rearward visibility was not limited to any single vehicle class. Australia's NRMA motoring organisation found that regular passenger cars commonly provided inferior rearward vision compared to SUVs, both because of the prevalence of reversing cameras on modern SUVs and the shape of many popular passenger cars, with their high rear window lines and boots (trunks) obstructing rearward vision. In NRMA testing, two out of 42 SUVs (5%) and 29 out of 163 (18%) regular cars had the worst rating (>15-metre blind spot). Of the vehicles that received a perfect 0-metre blind spot rating, 11 out of 42 (26%) were SUVs and eight out of 163 (5%) were regular passenger cars. All of the "perfect score" vehicles had OEM reversing cameras.

=== Wide bodies in narrow lanes ===
The wider bodies of larger vehicles mean they occupy a greater percentage of road lanes. This is particularly noticeable on the narrow roads sometimes found in dense urban areas or rural areas in Europe. Wider vehicles may also have difficulty fitting in some parking spaces and encroach further into traffic lanes when parked alongside the road.

=== Psychology ===
SUV safety concerns are affected by a perception among some consumers that SUVs are safer for their drivers than standard cars, and that they need not take basic precautions as if they were inside a "defensive capsule". According to G. C. Rapaille, a psychological consultant to automakers, many consumers feel safer in SUVs simply because their ride height makes "[their passengers] higher and dominate and look down [sic]. That you can look down [on other people] is psychologically a very powerful notion." This and the height and weight of SUVs may lead to consumers' perception of safety.

Gladwell also noted that SUV popularity is also a sign that people began to shift automobile safety focus from active to passive, to the point that in the US potential SUV buyers will give up an extra 30 ft (9.1 m) of braking distance because they believe they are helpless to avoid a tractor-trailer hit on any vehicle. The four-wheel drive option available to SUVs reinforced the passive safety notion. To support Gladwell's argument, he mentioned that automotive engineer David Champion noted that in his previous driving experience with Range Rover, his vehicle slid across a four-lane road because he did not perceive the slipping that others had experienced. Gladwell concluded that when a driver feels unsafe when driving a vehicle, it makes the vehicle safer. When a driver feels safe when driving, the vehicle becomes less safe.

Stephen Popiel, a vice president of Millward Brown Goldfarb automotive market-research company, noted that for most automotive consumers, safety has to do with the notion that they are not in complete control. Gladwell argued that many "accidents" are not outside driver's control, such as drunk driving, wearing seat belts, and the driver's age and experience.

=== Sense of security ===
Studies on the safety of SUV collisions have been mixed. In 2004, the National Highway Traffic Safety Administration released results of a study that indicated that drivers of SUVs were 11% more likely to die in an accident than people in cars. These figures were not driven by vehicle inherent safety alone but indicated perceived increased security on the part of drivers. For example, US SUV drivers were found to be less likely to wear their seatbelts and showed a tendency to drive more recklessly (most sensationally perhaps, in a 1996 finding that SUV drivers were more likely to drive drunk).

Actual driver death rates are monitored by the Insurance Institute for Highway Safety and vary between models. Historically, models like the Chevrolet Blazer were found to have some of the highest death rates among early SUVs due to their high rollover risk and lack of electronic stability control. Through vehicle redesign and the mandatory adoption of electronic stability control, this trend has changed. Recent studies by the IIHS have found that larger vehicles, including SUVs, offer significantly higher protection in a collision compared to smaller cars. In a 2020 report, the IIHS found that smaller cars and sedans were more likely to have the highest death rates. Half of the models with the lowest death rates were SUVs. Very large SUVs had the lowest overall death rate of any vehicle category. The IIHS went on to stress that vehicle mass is a crucial factor in occupant safety. Smaller vehicles have less mass, and offer less protection than larger vehicles.

These statistics show that average driver death rates in the US were lower in larger vehicles from 2015 to 2018, and that there was significant overlap between vehicle categories.

US driver death rates from 2015 to 2018 in recent models (per million registered vehicles per year)
| Vehicle type | No. of models | Deaths |
|---|---|---|
| Mini 4-door cars | 4 | 72-141 |
| Small 4-door cars | 20 | 0-98 |
| Mid-size 4-door cars | 17 | 14-68 |
| Large 4-door cars | 7 | 14-62 |
| Mini 2-door cars | 2 | 10-95 |
| Small 2-door cars | 2 | 11-63 |
| Mid-size 2-door cars | 1 | 48 |
| Large 2-door cars | 1 | 65 |
| Mid-size sports cars | 3 | 45-81 |
| Large sports cars | 1 | 39 |
| Mid-size luxury cars | 9 | 0-60 |
| Large Luxury cars | 1 | 16 |
| Very large luxury cars | 1 | 21 |
| Mini station wagons | 3 | 48-81 |
| Mid-size station wagons | 8 | 18-96 |
| Minivans | 6 | 7-41 |
| Small SUVs | 21 | 7-73 |
| Midsize SUVs | 41 | 0-51 |
| Large SUVs | 16 | 0-55 |
| Very large SUVs | 4 | 0-25 |
| Small pickups | 9 | 15-58 |
| Large pickups | 25 | 7-54 |
| Very large pickups | 9 | 15-23 |

While the weight advantage of SUVs provides occupants with greater security in an accident, critics argue that this safety comes at the expense of other road users with smaller vehicles. Philosopher Steve Vanderheiden stated that this mismatch in physical characteristics between SUVs and smaller passenger cars can create crash incompatibility. Tall bumper heights and stiff frames of SUVs can overwhelm the crumple zones and safety cages of smaller passenger cars, leading to deadlier consequences for the latter's occupants.

Data from the NHTSA also shows that in fatal head on collisions involving a passenger car and an SUV, an occupant was more frequently killed in the passenger car as opposed to one in an SUV. The difference in size between vehicle classes also disproportionately contributes to injuries and fatalities among pedestrians, with the largest percentage of pedestrian fatalities occurring in crashes involving SUVs and other vehicles in the light truck category.

== Marketing practices ==
The marketing techniques used to sell SUVs have been under criticism. Advertisers and manufacturers alike have been assailed for greenwashing. Critics have cited SUV commercials that show the product being driven through a wilderness area, even though relatively few SUVs are ever driven off-road.

SUVs are classified as light trucks in the United States. In many cases, vehicles classified under "light trucks" can avoid certain fuel economy regulations and size regulations—often called a "light truck exemption". Thus, this loophole has led to the mass upselling and marketing of SUVs, with many viewing it as a corporate scam designed to increase profit margins for the auto industry, particularly for the Big Three in the United States.

In Australia, Great Wall Motor (GWM) launched an advertising campaign for a new SUV in 2025 with the tagline "Be More Tank". This advertising campaign was rolled out in Sydney among record road fatalities in New South Wales, Australia, Thinkerbell, the advertising agency responsible, also used weapon-like rhetoric in announcing their work, stating "The launch arms Australians and New Zealanders with a powerful vehicle". Safe streets groups in Australia criticised this campaign, even though SUVs and utes are increasingly popular.

== Fuel economy ==
The recent growth of SUVs is sometimes given as one reason why the population has begun to consume more gasoline than in previous years. SUVs generally use more fuel than passenger vehicles or minivans with the same number of seats. Additionally, SUVs up to 8,500 pounds GVWR are classified by the US government as light trucks, and thus are subject to the less strict light truck standard under the Corporate Average Fuel Economy (CAFE) regulations, and SUVs which exceed 8,500 pounds GVWR have been entirely exempt from CAFE standards. This provides less incentive for US manufacturers to produce more fuel-efficient models.

As a result of their off-road design SUVs may have fuel-inefficient features. High profile increases wind resistance and greater mass require heavier suspensions and larger drivetrains, which both contribute to increased vehicle weight. Some SUVs come with tires designed for off-road traction rather than low rolling resistance.

Fuel economy factors include:

- High masses (compared to the average load) causing high energy demand in transitional operation (in the cities) ${P_{accel}= m_{vehicle} \cdot a \cdot v }$ where $P_{accel} \,\!$ stands for power, $m_{vehicle} \,\!$ for the vehicle mass, ${a} \,\!$ for acceleration and ${v} \,\!$ for the vehicle velocity.
- High cross-sectional area causing very high drag losses especially when driven at high speed ${P_{drag}= A_{cross} \cdot cw_{vehicle} \cdot \frac {v_{air}^3 \rho_{air}} {2} }$ where $P_{drag} \,\!$ stands for the power, ${A_{cross}}\,\!$ for the cross-sectional area of the vehicle, ${\rho_{air}} \,\!$ for the density of the air and $v_{air} \,\!$ for the relative velocity of the air (incl. wind).
- High rolling resistance due to all-terrain tires (even worse if low pressure is needed offroad) and high vehicle mass driving the rolling resistance ${P_{roll}= \mu_{roll} \cdot m_{vehicle} \cdot v }$ where $\mu_{roll} \,\!$ stands for the rolling resistance factor and $m_{vehicle} \,\!$ for the vehicle mass.

Average data for vehicle types sold in the US:

| Type | Width | | Height | | Curb weight | | Combined fuel economy | | |
| Type | in | cm | in | cm | lb | kg | mpg (US) | l/100 km | mpg (imp) |
|---|---|---|---|---|---|---|---|---|---|
| SUVs | 70.5 | 179 | 69.7 | 177 | 4442 | 2015 | 19.19 | 12.26 | 23.05 |
| Minivans | 75.9 | 193 | 67.2 | 171 | 4075 | 1848 | 20.36 | 11.55 | 24.45 |
| Family sedans | 70.3 | 179 | 57.3 | 146 | 3144 | 1426 | 26.94 | 8.731 | 32.35 |

Drag resistance (assuming the same drag coefficient which is not a safe assumption) for SUVs may be 30% higher and the acceleration force has to be 35% larger for the same acceleration, which again is not a safe assumption, than family sedans if we use the figures from the above table.

== Pollution ==
Because SUVs tend to use more fuel (mile for mile) than cars with the same engine type, they generate higher volumes of pollutants (particularly carbon dioxide) into the atmosphere. This has been confirmed by LCA (Life Cycle Assessment) studies, which quantify the environmental impacts of products such as cars, often from the time they are produced until they are recycled. One LCA study which took into account the production of greenhouse gases, carcinogens, and waste production found that exclusive cars, sports cars and SUVs were "characterized by a poor environmental performance." Another study found that family size internal combustion vehicles still produced fewer emissions than a hybrid SUV.

Various eco-activist groups, such as the Earth Liberation Front or Les Dégonflés have targeted SUV dealerships and privately owned SUVs due to concern over increased fuel usage.

In the US, light trucks and SUVs are held to a less-strict pollution control standard than passenger cars. In response to the perception that a growing share of fuel consumption and emissions are attributable to these vehicles, the Environmental Protection Agency ruled that by the model year 2009, emissions from all light trucks and passenger cars will be regulated equally.

The British national newspaper The Independent reported on a study carried out by CNW Marketing Research which suggested that CO_{2} emissions alone do not reflect the true environmental costs of a car. The newspaper reported that: "CNW moves beyond the usual CO_{2} emissions figures and uses a "dust-to-dust" calculation of a car's environmental impact, from its creation to its ultimate destruction." The newspaper also reported that the CNW research put the Jeep Wrangler above the Toyota Prius and other hybrid cars as the greenest car that could be bought in the US. However, it was noted that Toyota disputed the proportion of energy used to make a car compared with how much the vehicle uses during its life; CNW said 80% of the energy a car uses is accounted for by manufacture and 20% in use. Toyota claimed the reverse.

The report has raised controversy. When Oregon radio station KATU asked for comment on the CNW report, Professor John Heywood of the Massachusetts Institute of Technology (MIT) saw merit in the study saying, "It raises...some good questions" but "I can only guess at how they did the detailed arithmetic.... The danger is a report like this will discourage the kind of thinking we want consumers to do – should I invest in this new technology, should I help this new technology?"

The Rocky Mountain Institute alleged that even after making assumptions that would lower the environmental impact of the Hummer H3 relative to the Prius, "the Prius still has a lower impact on the environment. This indicates that the unpublished assumptions and inputs used by CNW must continue the trend of favoring the Hummer or disfavoring the Prius. Since the researchers at Argonne Labs performed a careful survey of all recent life cycle analysis of cars, especially hybrids, our research underlines the deep divide between CNW's study and all scientifically reviewed and accepted work on the same topic."

A report done by the Pacific Institute alleges "serious biases and flaws" in the study published by CNW, claiming that "the report's conclusions rely on faulty methods of analysis, untenable assumptions, selective use and presentation of data, and a complete lack of peer review."

For his part, CNW's Art Spinella says environmental campaigners may be right about SUVs, but hybrids are an expensive part of the automotive picture. The vehicle at the top of his environmentally-friendly list is the Scion xB because it is easy to build, cheap to run and recycle, and carries a cost of 49 cents a mile over its lifetime. "I don't like the Hummer people using that as an example to justify the fact that they bought a Hummer," he said. "Just as it's not for Prius owners to necessarily believe that they're saving the entire globe, the environment for the entire world, that's not true either."

In the June 2008 "From Dust to Dust" study, the Prius cost per lifetime-mile fell 23.5%, to $2.19 per lifetime mile, while the H3 cost rose 12.5%, to $2.33 per lifetime-mile. Actual results depend upon the distance driven during the vehicle's life.

== Greenhouse gas emissions ==
Unmodified, SUVs emit 700 megatonnes of carbon dioxide per year, which causes global warming. While SUVs can be electrified, their (manufacturing) emissions will always be larger than smaller electric cars. They can also be converted to run on a variety of alternative fuels, including hydrogen. That said, the vast majority of these vehicles are not converted to use alternative fuels.

== Civic infrastructure ==
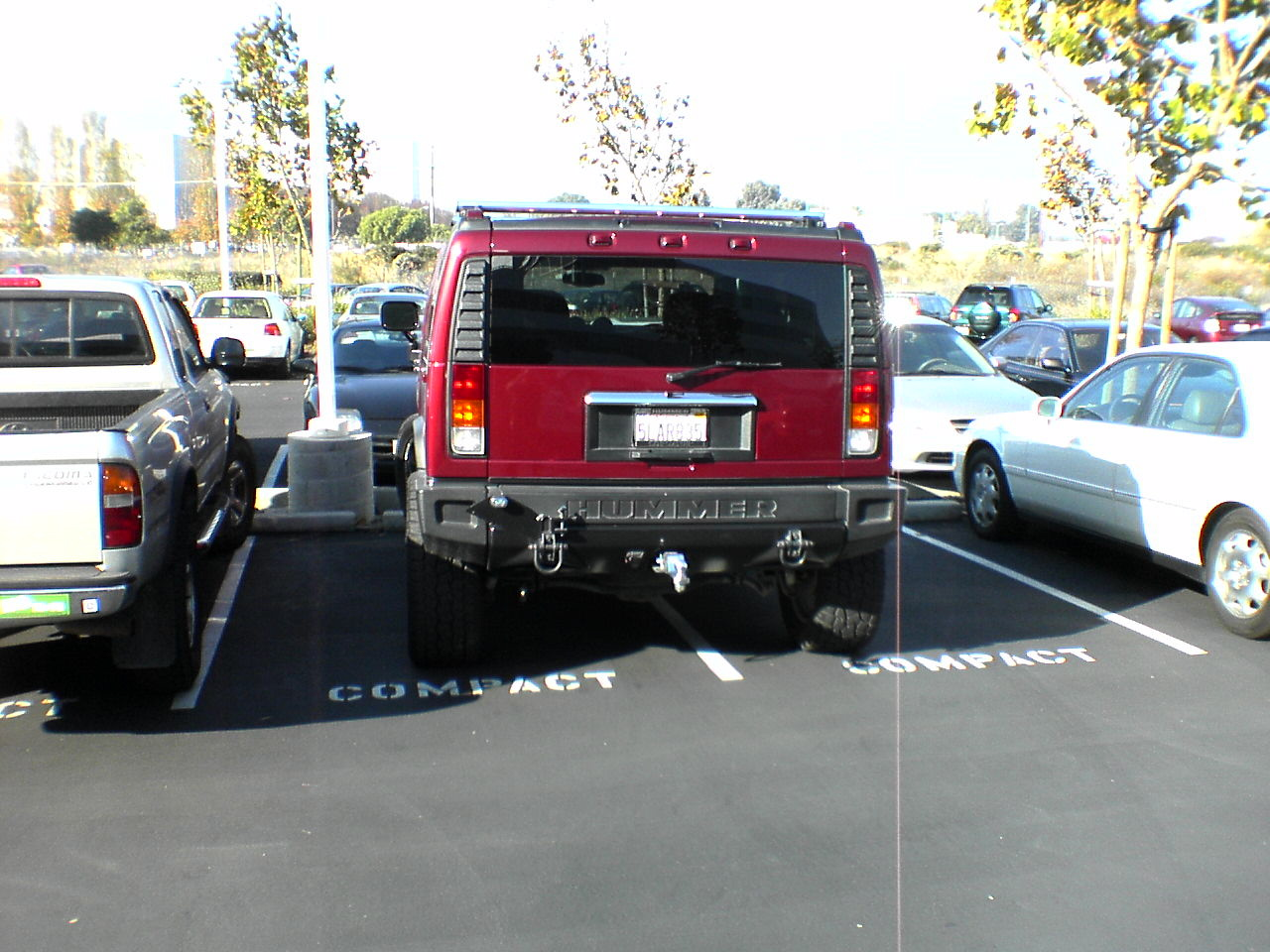
A single Hummer using up two compact car parking spaces

Because SUVs take up more space, they worsen traffic congestion and reduce parking availability. Their increased weight causes them to degrade roads faster, leading to increased civic maintenance costs.

The length and especially width of large SUVs is particularly controversial in urban areas. In areas with limited parking spaces, large SUV drivers have been criticized for parking in stalls marked for compact cars or that are too narrow for the width of larger vehicles. Critics have stated that this causes problems such as the loss of use of the adjacent space, reduced accessibility into the entry of an adjacent vehicle, blockage of driveway space, and damage inflicted, by the door, to adjacent vehicles. As a backlash against the alleged space consumption of SUVs, the city of Florence, has restricted access of SUVs to the center, and Paris and Vienna have debated banning them altogether.

== Activism ==
Siân Berry was a founder of the Alliance against Urban 4×4s, which began in Camden in 2003 and became a national campaign demanding measures to stop 4×4s (or sport utility vehicles) "taking over our cities". The campaign was known for its "theatrical demonstrations" and mock parking tickets, credited to Berry (although now adapted by numerous local groups).

In Sweden, a group which called themselves "Asfaltsdjungelns indianer" (en: The Indians of the asphalt jungle), carried out actions in Stockholm, Gothenburg, Malmö and a number of smaller cities. The group, created in 2007, released the air from the tires on an estimated 300 SUVs during their first year. Their mission was to highlight the high fuel consumption of SUVs, as they thought that SUV owners did not have the right to drive such big vehicles at the expense of others. The group received some attention in media, and declared a truce in December 2007.

Similar activist groups, most likely inspired by the Swedish group, have carried out actions in Denmark, Scotland, and Finland.

== See also ==
- Automobile safety
- Autobesity
- Environmental impact of transport
  - Air pollution
  - Environmental aspects of the electric car
  - Gas-guzzler
- Mobile source air pollution – Air pollution emitted by motor vehicles, airplanes, locomotives, and other engines
  - Exhaust gas – Gases emitted as a result of fuel reactions in combustion engines
