= CNW (disambiguation) =

The Chicago and North Western Transportation Company was a U.S. railroad that existed from 1859 to 1995.

CNW may also refer to:

- China Northwest Airlines
- CNW Group, also Canada NewsWire, a Canadian commercial news release service
- CNW Marketing Research
- CelebrityNetWorth
- Con-way, a freight transportation and logistics company
- Conwy railway station, train request stop in Wales, UK
- Córdoba North Western Railway
- TSTC Waco Airport, in Texas, United States (IATA code)
