= List of music artists by net worth =

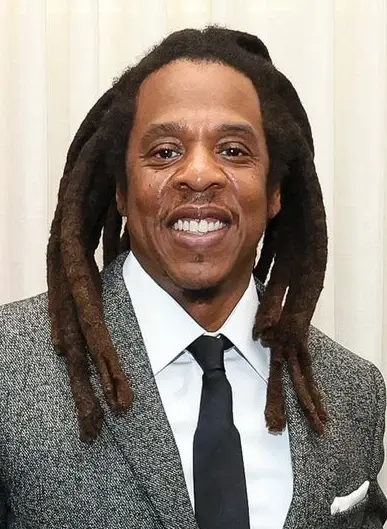
American rapper Jay-Z is the wealthiest music artist in the world, with estimated earnings at US$2.8 billion as of 2026.

The following is a list of music artists with the highest estimated net worth (also known as wealthiest musicians or richest musicians), based on calculations by reputable publications such as Forbes and The Sunday Times Rich List. As of November 2026, eight music artists have reached the billionaire status on Forbes reports, among them: Jay-Z leading the list with $2.8 billion, Taylor Swift—the richest female musician—and then Rihanna, the first female artist to become a billionaire.

Forbes lists are dominated by American artists, while musicians of other nationalities have built their wealth predominantly in the U.S., such as Celine Dion. When Forbes 400 Richest Americans debuted in 1982, Yoko Ono was the only musician listed, with a net worth of $155 million (equivalent to $500 million in 2025), largely due to the music royalties of her late husband John Lennon's band the Beatles. In 1991, Forbes estimated Michael Jackson's net worth at $230 million (equivalent to $544 million in 2025), making him the wealthiest musician and the second-wealthiest entertainer, behind comedian Bill Cosby. According to some insiders, it is estimated that Jackson's estate is worth over $2 billion as of 2024.

Outside of Forbes, net worth estimations vary amid the same artists and different sources, as some media outlets have published estimations from various websites and lists such as CelebrityNetWorth and Bankrate, or other business-related publication. For instance, Bloomberg L.P. valued Selena Gomez at US$1.3 billion in 2024, while Forbes estimated her net worth at only $700 million by 2025. U2 singer Bono and Madonna have been described as a billionaire, though neither have been accorded such status by Forbes.

== Forbes ==
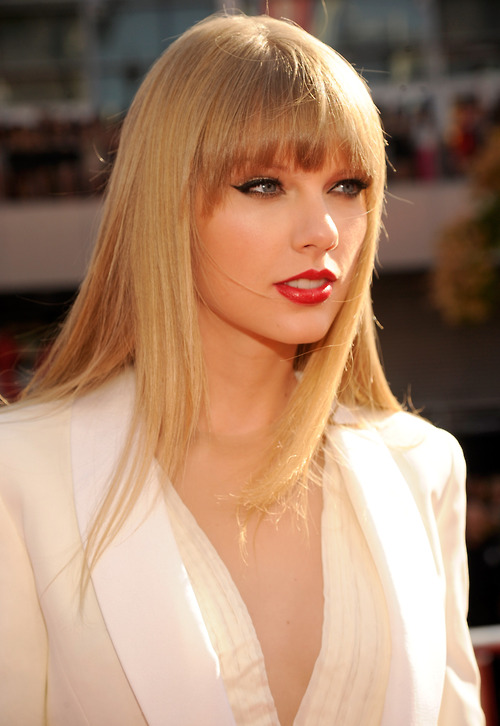
American singer Taylor Swift is the wealthiest female musician, with a net worth of US$2.1 billion as of 2026.

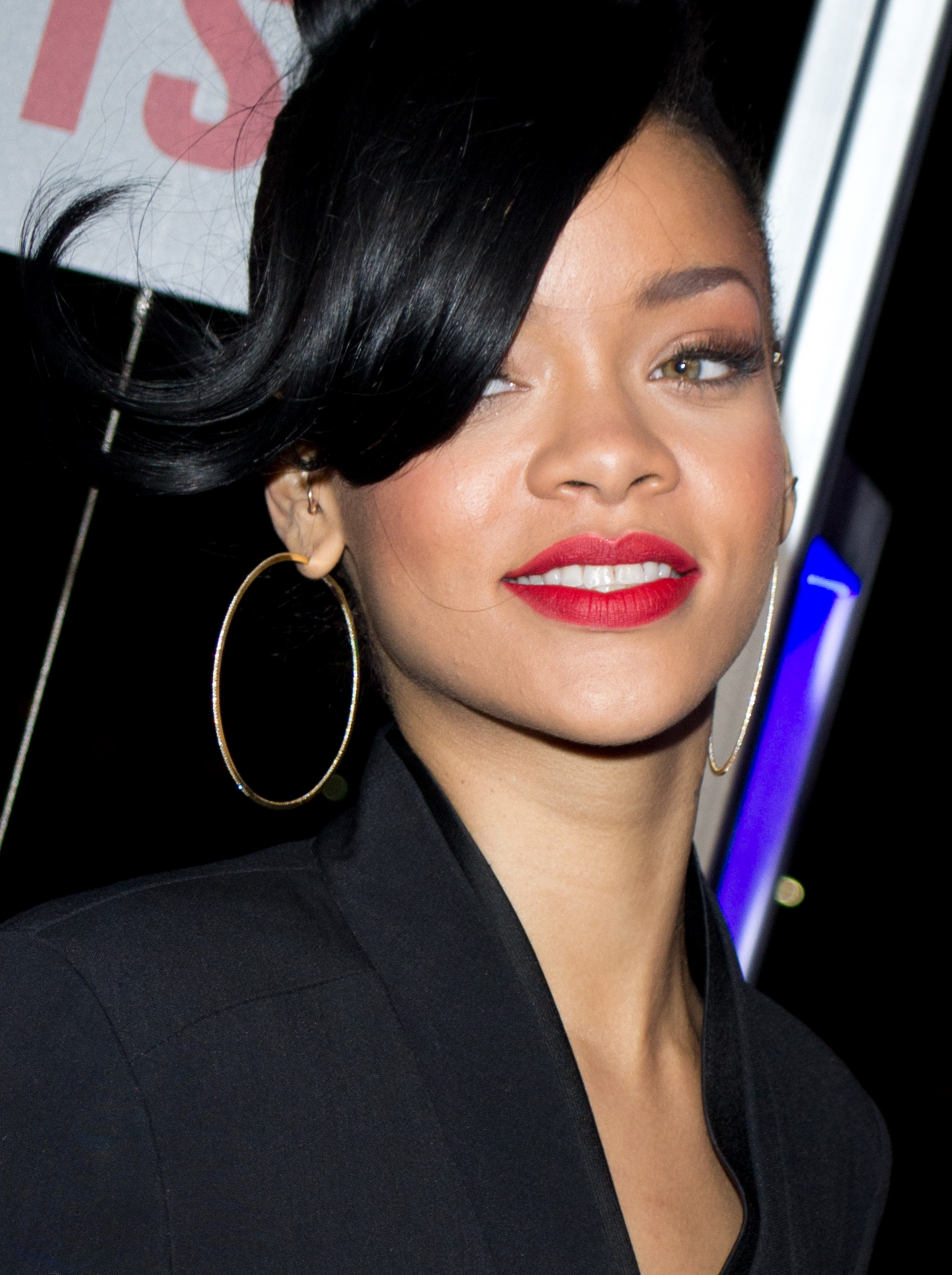
Barbadian singer Rihanna became the first female musician to attain a billionaire status in 2021, with a net worth of $1.7 billion at that time.

Music artists with a net worth of over $300 million (adjusted for inflation) according to Forbes most recent estimate:

Music artists with the highest net worth reported by Forbes
Artists	Nationality	Lifetime	Net worth			Report year		Ref.
Artists	Nationality	Lifetime	Latest estimation	Peak estimation	Peak estimation adjusted in 2026 $	Latest	Peak	Ref.
Jay-Z	United States	1969–present	$2.8 billion		$2.8 billion	2026		
Taylor Swift	United States	1989–present	$2.1 billion		$2.1 billion	2026		
Paul McCartney	United Kingdom	1942–present	$1.4 billion		$1.4 billion	2026		
Bruce Springsteen	United States	1949–present	$1.2 billion		$1.2 billion	2025		
Beyoncé	United States	1981–present	$1 billion		$1 billion	2025		
Rihanna	Barbados	1988–present	$1 billion	$1.7 billion	$2.02 billion	2025	2021	
Dr. Dre	United States	1965–present	$1 billion		$1 billion	2026		
Jimmy Buffett	United States	1946–2023	$1 billion		$1.06 billion	2023		
Madonna	United States	1958–present	$850 million		$850 million	2025		
Selena Gomez (Note: Selena Gomez is a billionaire according to Bloomberg L.P., which estimated her net worth at $1.3 billion as of 2024.)	United States	1992–present	$700 million		$700 million	2025		
Julio Iglesias	Spain	1943–present	$600 million (Note: Julio Iglesias' net worth according to Forbes Spain.)		$634 million	2023		
Celine Dion	Canada	1968–present	$570 million		$570 million	2025		
Barbra Streisand	United States	1942–present	$510 million		$510 million	2025		
Dolly Parton	United States	1946–2026	$450 million		$450 million	2025		
Jon Bon Jovi	United States	1962–present	$410 million		$550 million	2016		
Kanye West	United States	1977–present	$400 million	$2.77 billion (Note: Outside of Forbes, estimates of Kanye West's net worth have been dynamic. The Bloomberg Billionaires Index valued him at $6.6 billion in 2021, while West himself measured at least US$3.3 billion in 2020.)	$3.05 billion	2025	2022	
Sean Combs	United States	1969–present	$400 million	$820 million (Note: Former Forbes editor Zack O'Malley Greenburg estimated Combs' net worth at $1 billion on a Substack report in 2022.)	$1.08 billion	2024	2017	
Katy Perry	United States	1984–present	$360 million		$360 million	2025		
Michael Jackson	United States	1958–2009	$350 million		$613 million	2003		
Mariah Carey	United States	1969–present	$225 million		$349 million	2007		
Yoko Ono	Japan	1933–present	$150 million		$500 million	1982		

== Sunday Times Rich List ==
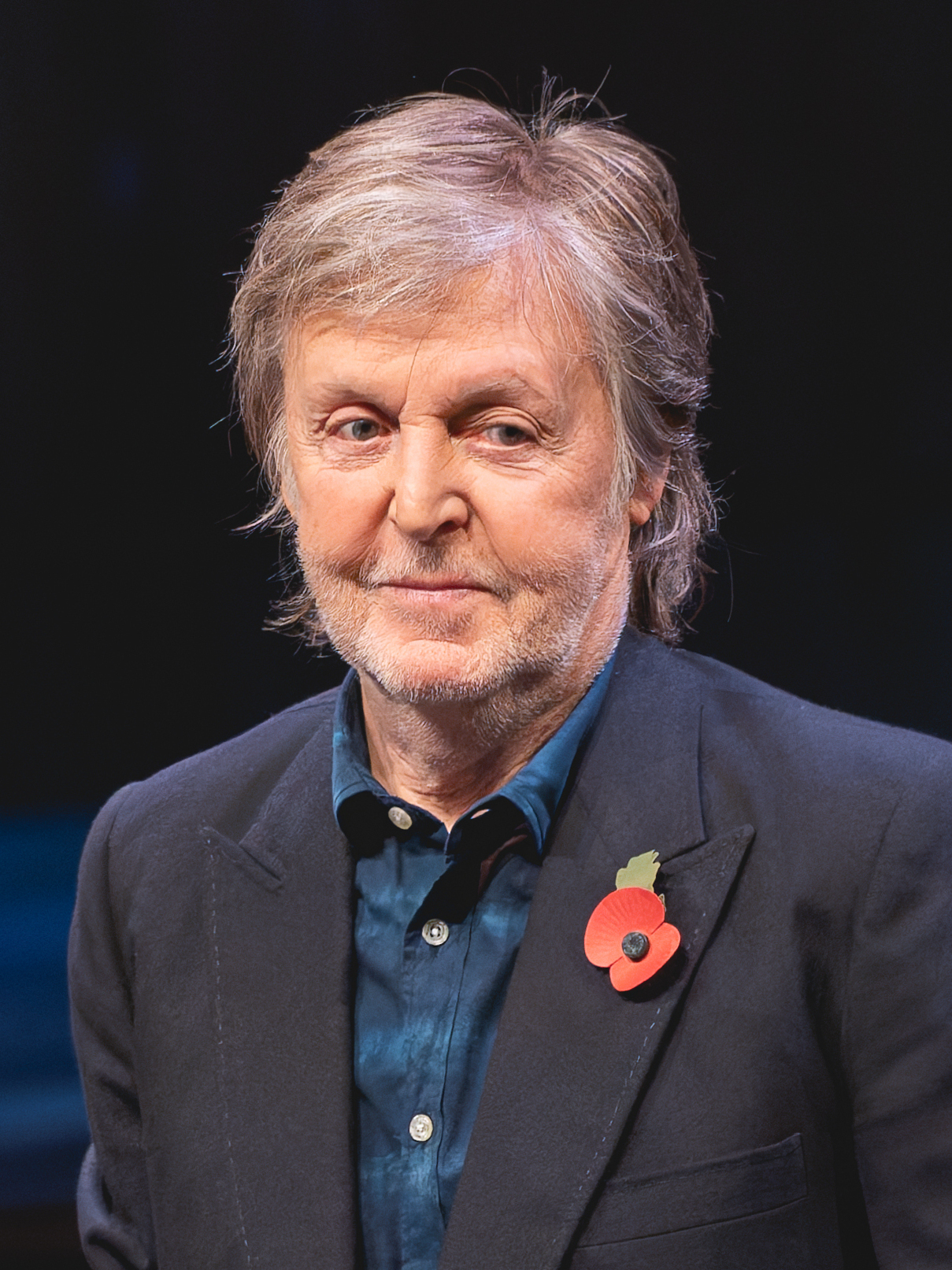
British singer Paul McCartney is a billionaire, according to both Sunday Times Rich List and Forbes.

The following are music artists from the United Kingdom and Ireland with a net worth of over £300 million, according to the Sunday Times Rich List.

Music artists with the highest net worth reported on the Sunday Times Rich List
Artist(s)	Nationality	Lifetime	Net worth			Report year		Ref.
Artist(s)	Nationality	Lifetime	Latest estimation	Peak estimation	Peak estimation adjusted in 2025 £	Latest	Peak	Ref.
Paul McCartney	United Kingdom	1942–present	£1.055 billion		£1.06 billion	2026		
U2	Ireland	1976–present	£625 million		£709 million	2022		
Andrew Lloyd Webber	United Kingdom	1948–present	£516 million	£820 million	£1.05 billion	2026	2019	
Elton John	United Kingdom	1947–present	£480 million		£480 million	2026		
Coldplay (Note: Although The Sunday Times reported the combined net worth of Coldplay, they were not listed collectively as a group on Sunday Times Rich List 2022)	United Kingdom	1997–present	£471 million		£535 million	2022		
Mick Jagger	United Kingdom	1943–present	£450 million		£450 million	2026		
Keith Richards	United Kingdom	1943–present	£450 million		£450 million	2026		
Ed Sheeran	United Kingdom	1991–present	£410 million		£410 million	2026		
Noel and Liam Gallagher	United Kingdom	1967–present	£375 million		£375 million	2026		
Brian May	United Kingdom	1947–present	£360 million		£360 million	2026		
Roger Taylor	United Kingdom	1949–present	£360 million		£360 million	2026		
Sting	United Kingdom	1951–present	£320 million		£363 million	2022		

== Artists' estates ==
In 2020, one Elvis Presley's state executive told Rolling Stone magazine that artist's estate was worth between US$400–500 million. As of 2024, the estate of Michael Jackson has been valued over US$2 billion.

== See also ==
- Hollywood accounting
- Forbes Top 40 (1987–1998)
- Forbes Celebrity 100 (1999–2020)
- Forbes list of the world's highest-paid musicians
- Forbes list of the world's highest-paid dead celebrities
- List of celebrities by net worth
