= Ford Excursion =

American heavy-duty SUV

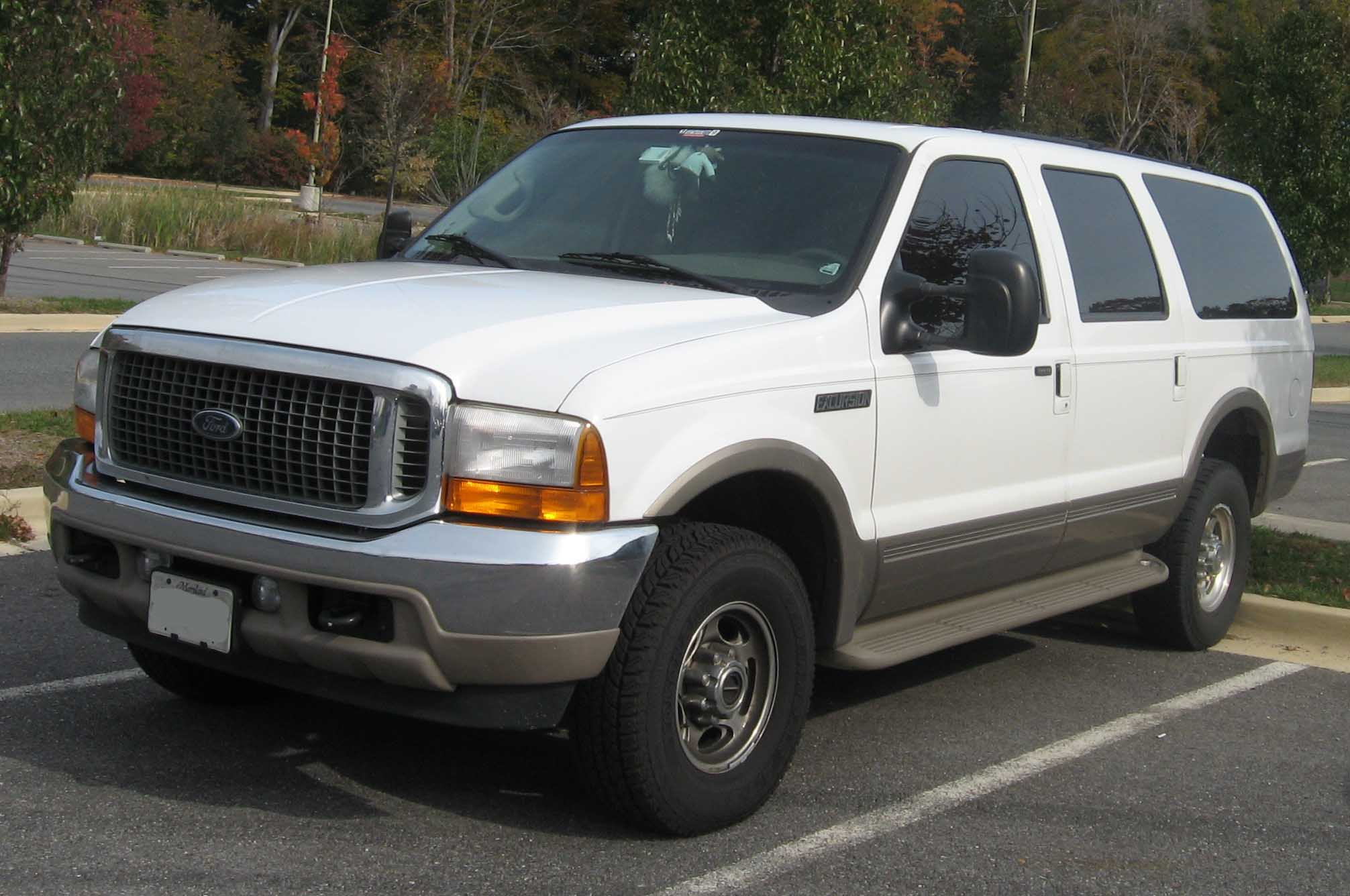
- 2001 Ford Excursion Limited

Overview
- Manufacturer: Ford Motor Company
- Model code: UW137
- Production: 1999 – September 30, 2005
- Model years: 2000–2005; 2000–2006 (Mexico)
- Assembly: Louisville, Kentucky (Kentucky Truck Assembly)

Body and chassis
- Class: Full-size SUV
- Body style: 4-door SUV
- Layout: Front engine, rear-wheel drive / four-wheel drive
- Chassis: Body-on-frame
- Related: Ford Super Duty

Powertrain
- Engine: 5.4 L Triton V8; 6.8 L Triton V10; 7.3 L Power Stroke V8 turbodiesel 6.0 L Power Stroke V8 turbodiesel
- Transmission: Ford 4R100 4-speed automatic Ford 5R110W 5-speed automatic

Dimensions
- Wheelbase: 137.1 in (3,482 mm)
- Length: 226.7 in (5,758 mm)
- Width: 2000–01: 80.0 in (2,032 mm); 2002–05: 79.9 in (2,029 mm)
- Height: 4WD: 80.2 in (2,037 mm); 2WD: 77.2 in (1,961 mm)
- Curb weight: 7,700 lb (3,500 kg) (Turbodiesel); 7,200 lb (3,300 kg) (Gasoline)

The Ford Excursion is a heavy-duty (Class 2) full-size SUV marketed by Ford Motor Company from the 2000 through 2005 model years. The third Ford SUV derived from the Ford F-Series (following the Ford Bronco and the Ford Expedition), the Excursion was derived from the 3/4-ton F-250 Super Duty pickup truck. As with the Expedition, the model line was developed as a competitor for the Chevrolet Suburban, with the Excursion targeting the 2500-series (3/4-ton) Chevrolet Suburban/GMC Yukon XL.

Sharing its chassis with the regular cab, long-bed Ford F-250 Super Duty, the Excursion accommodated heavier-duty powertrains than its Expedition counterpart. For nearly two decades, it was notable as the longest SUV ever mass-produced (matched by the 2023 Jeep Grand Wagoneer L and beaten by the 2021 Cadillac Escalade ESV); it remains the longest-wheelbase SUV ever produced. As of current production, only the GMC Hummer EV SUV is heavier.

Ford assembled the Excursion alongside the Ford Super Duty line at its Kentucky Truck Plant facility (Louisville, Kentucky). Following its discontinuation in the United States and Canada, a shortened model year was offered exclusively for Mexico, with the final example rolling off the assembly line on Kentucky Truck Plant (Louisville, Kentucky). For 2007, Ford repackaged its extended-length SUV as the Ford Expedition EL/MAX (today, Expedition MAX), moving from the Super Duty chassis to the F-150 architecture.

== Origin and concept ==
For the 1973 model year, General Motors redesigned its Suburban utility wagon (branded as both a Chevrolet and GMC) as part of its Rounded-Line C/K trucks. In a central part of the model update, the Suburban adopted a fourth passenger door, matching the configuration of car-based station wagons (GM would market the Suburban as a truck-based station wagon until its 1991 discontinuation). At the time, the model line competed against the similar International Harvester Travelall and the smaller Jeep Wagoneer. Following the 1975 model year, International retired the Travelall wagon, leaving the Suburban essentially to compete between its own Chevrolet and GMC branding (the Jeep Wagoneer was nearly three feet shorter and had begun its rise as a luxury vehicle).

For 1978, Ford released the second generation of the Ford Bronco, repackaging it as a variant of the Ford F-Series. To make the model line more competitive against the Chevrolet K5 Blazer/GMC Jimmy and Dodge Ramcharger, the Bronco grew nearly 2½ feet in length, but returned in its most popular configuration: a three-door half-cab wagon with a removable hardtop. In contrast with GM, the model line was not developed as a five-door wagon to match the Suburban (as the Blazer/Jimmy shared part of its design with the larger wagon). During the 1980s and early 1990s, Ford continued to produce the Bronco as a three-door variant of the F-150, but accommodated demand for five-door vehicles on special-order basis as license-built vehicles from second-party manufacturers. To assemble the design, the rear bodywork of the Bronco was mated to the body of an F-Series crew-cab pickup truck. Examples used the 1-ton F-350 chassis (a first since the IHC Travelall) as a basis, contrasting with the ½-ton or ¾-ton payload series offered by the Suburban.

For 1997, Ford replaced its three-door SUV with a five-door design; after 30 years, the Bronco was replaced by the Ford Expedition (coinciding an industry-wide decline in demand for three-door SUVs). Sharing its design with the redesigned F-150, the Expedition largely adopted the form of the Suburban: a three-row SUV wagon with a permanently mounted roof. The model line was sized between the two-row Chevrolet Tahoe 5-door wagon (which replaced the K5 Blazer during 1995) and the larger Suburban.

For 1999, Ford expanded the F-Series model range, with the F-250 and F-350 pickups (and all larger Ford trucks) becoming Ford Super Duty trucks; in addition to a distinct body design, the larger trucks offered a heavier-duty chassis and suspension along with larger engines, providing Ford a basis to directly match the 2500-series Suburban.

== Design overview ==
The Ford Excursion was introduced for the 2000 model year on September 30, 1999. In contrast to the Expedition (which replaced the Bronco), the Excursion had no direct predecessor in the Ford truck line. In terms of passenger capacity and exterior dimensions within the Ford model line, the Excursion is outranked only by the Ford E-350 Super Wagon (and the Transit 350/350HD that replaced it).

=== Chassis ===
The Ford Excursion shares many body and chassis assemblies with its F-250 pickup truck counterpart. The front suspension and most of the rear suspension were common components, but the Excursion was fitted with different leaf springs and front spring hanger brackets. The Excursion had a distinct frame which differed from the front sway bar mounts rearward, making the model taller and wider than its pickup truck counterpart.

The rear axle for all Excursions was a Sterling 10.5 axle. The four-wheel-drive models had an NV273 transfer case and Dana 50 front axle. Rear axle ratios of 3.73:1 and 4.30:1 were offered.

During the development of the chassis, Ford learned that its initial design caused smaller vehicles (such as a Ford Taurus) to become severely overridden in a head-on collision. In the test, the tire of the Excursion drove up to the windshield of the Taurus (reducing the chance of survival for its driver). As a response, Ford modified the chassis to include an under-bumper "blocker beam"; a safety device the French transportation ministry initially tested in 1971. To prevent underriding during rear-end collisions, a trailer hitch was made standard equipment, essentially performing the same function as the blocker beam.

==== Powertrain ====
During its entire production, the Excursion was offered with two Triton engines (truck versions of the Modular engine family). A 5.4 L V8 was standard, with an optional 6.8 L V10. At its launch, the Excursion offered a Navistar-produced 7.3 L turbodiesel Power Stroke V8. During 2003 production, Ford replaced the 7.3 L engine with a Navistar-produced 6.0 L turbodiesel Power Stroke V8; the all-new engine adopted a variable-geometry turbocharger.

An automatic transmission was paired to all four engines; no manual transmission was offered for the Excursion. A 4-speed 4R100 automatic fitted to the 5.4 L, 6.8 L, and 7.3 L engines; the 6.0 L turbodiesel used a 5-speed 5R110W automatic

Engine	Configuration	Fuel	Production	Power output	Torque output	Transmission
Ford Triton V8	5.4 L (330 cu in) SOHC 2V V8	Gasoline	2000–2005	255 hp (190 kW; 259 PS)	350 lb⋅ft (475 N⋅m)	Ford 4-speed 4R100 automatic
Ford Triton V10	6.8 L (413 cu in) SOHC 2V V10	Gasoline	2000–2005	310 hp (231 kW; 314 PS)	425 lb⋅ft (576 N⋅m)	Ford 4-speed 4R100 automatic
Ford/Navistar Power Stroke V8 (T444E)	7.3 L (444 cu in) OHV 4V V8 turbo	Diesel	2000–2003.5	250 hp (186 kW; 253 PS)	525 lb⋅ft (712 N⋅m)	Ford 4-speed 4R100 automatic
Ford/Navistar Power Stroke V8 (VT365)	6.0 L (365 cu in) OHV 4V V8 turbo	Diesel	2003.5–2005	325 hp (242 kW; 330 PS)	560 lb⋅ft (759 N⋅m)	Ford 5-speed 5R110W "TorqShift" automatic

Though using the 3/4-ton chassis of the F-250, the two-wheel-drive Excursion was rated with a GVWR of 8,600 lb (3,900 kg) when equipped with gasoline engines and 8,900 lb (4,000 kg) when equipped with diesel engines (four-wheel-drive models have a 300 lb (140 kg) higher GVWR with either engine). As its GVWR was above 8,500 lb (3,900 kg), the Excursion was exempt from EPA fuel economy ratings (and the Ford CAFE fleet); with the 6.8 L V10, reviewers cited real-world fuel economy in the range of 12-15 mpg. While its GVWR exempted it from emissions standards applied to light-duty vehicles, Ford designed the powertrains of the Excursion to meet low emissions vehicle (LEV) status.

=== Body design ===
As the smaller Ford Expedition was developed as a wagon counterpart of the Ford F-150, the Excursion adopted a high degree of commonality from the larger F-250 Super Duty. From the B-pillars forward, the Excursion shares nearly its entire body with its pickup truck counterpart, differing with its egg-crate grille (a style established by the Expedition and the third-generation Explorer). The Excursion is fitted with slightly different rear passenger doors than the crew-cab pickup (using forward-canted C-pillars instead of a fully rectangular design); while the rear bodywork is permanently mounted, the wagon body is styled similarly to the 1980-1996 Bronco (with larger, flush-mounted glass). In place of a conventional liftgate, the Excursion was fitted with a three-way cargo door similar to the 1992-2005 Chevrolet Astro, pairing a top-hinged full-width window (with rear wiper) with side-hinged 50/50 split rear doors; larger taillamps were sourced directly from the E-Series van. For 2005, the Excursion underwent a minor front facelift, replacing the eggcrate grille with components shared from the F-250.

Coinciding with its design commonality with the Ford Super Duty crew cab, the Excursion was a mass-produced SUV with four full-length passenger doors. Along with the Chevrolet Suburban (and its GMC/Cadillac counterparts) and the International Travelall, the only mass-produced model lines with the design feature are the Ford Expedition Max/Lincoln Navigator L and the Jeep (Grand) Wagoneer L.

Sharing its dashboard entirely from the F-250 (with the addition of an "Excursion" nameplate badge), the interior was offered in either 8 or 9-passenger seating (with either a front bench seat or front bucket seats). In line with the Suburban and the Bronco (as standard equipment), the spare tire was mounted vertically on the side of the cargo area (behind the third-row seat). For 2002, the instrument panel underwent minor revisions (receiving a digital odometer and a transmission temperature gauge); seating materials underwent revisions.

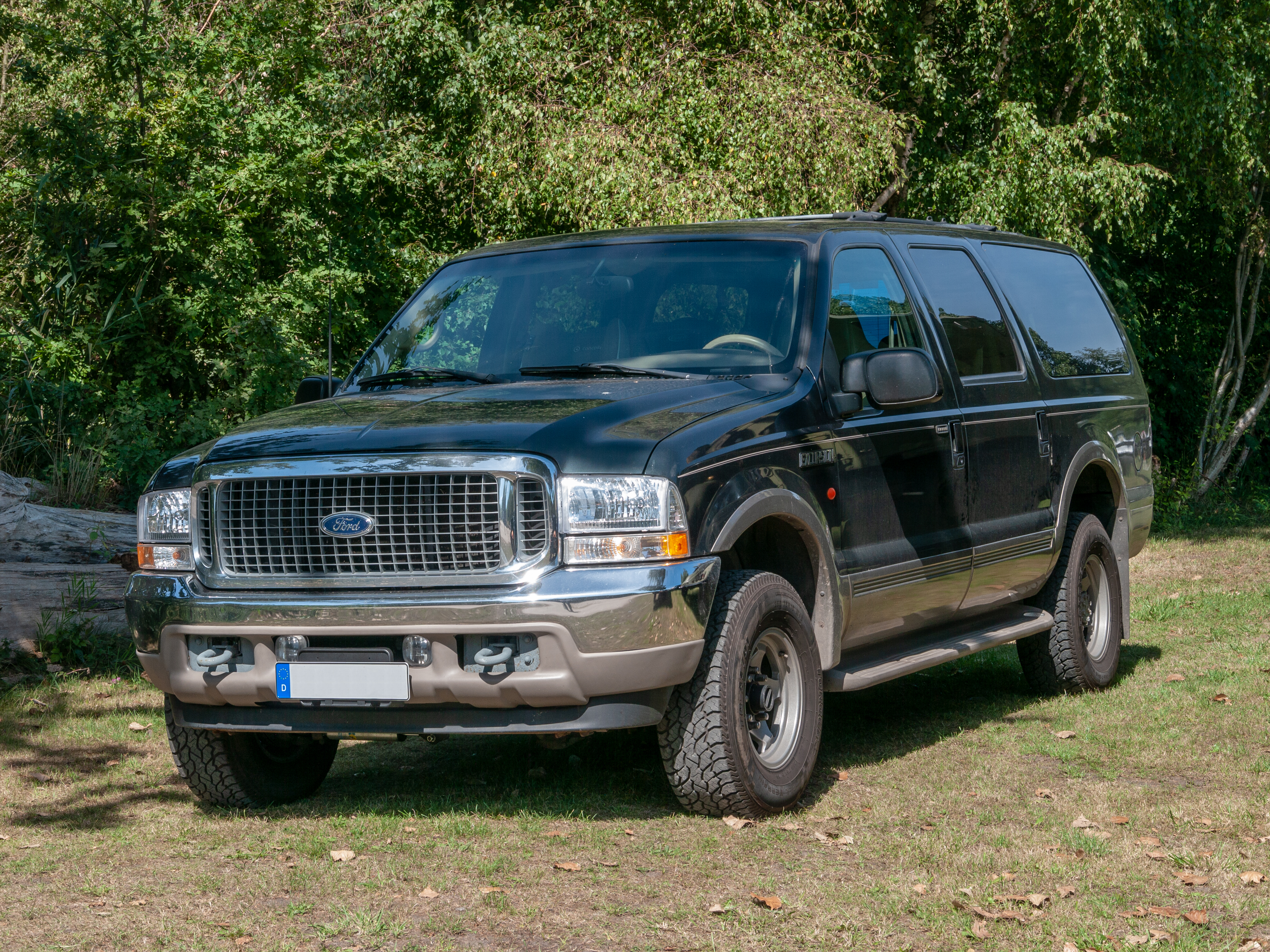
2002–2004 Ford Excursion Limited (Germany)

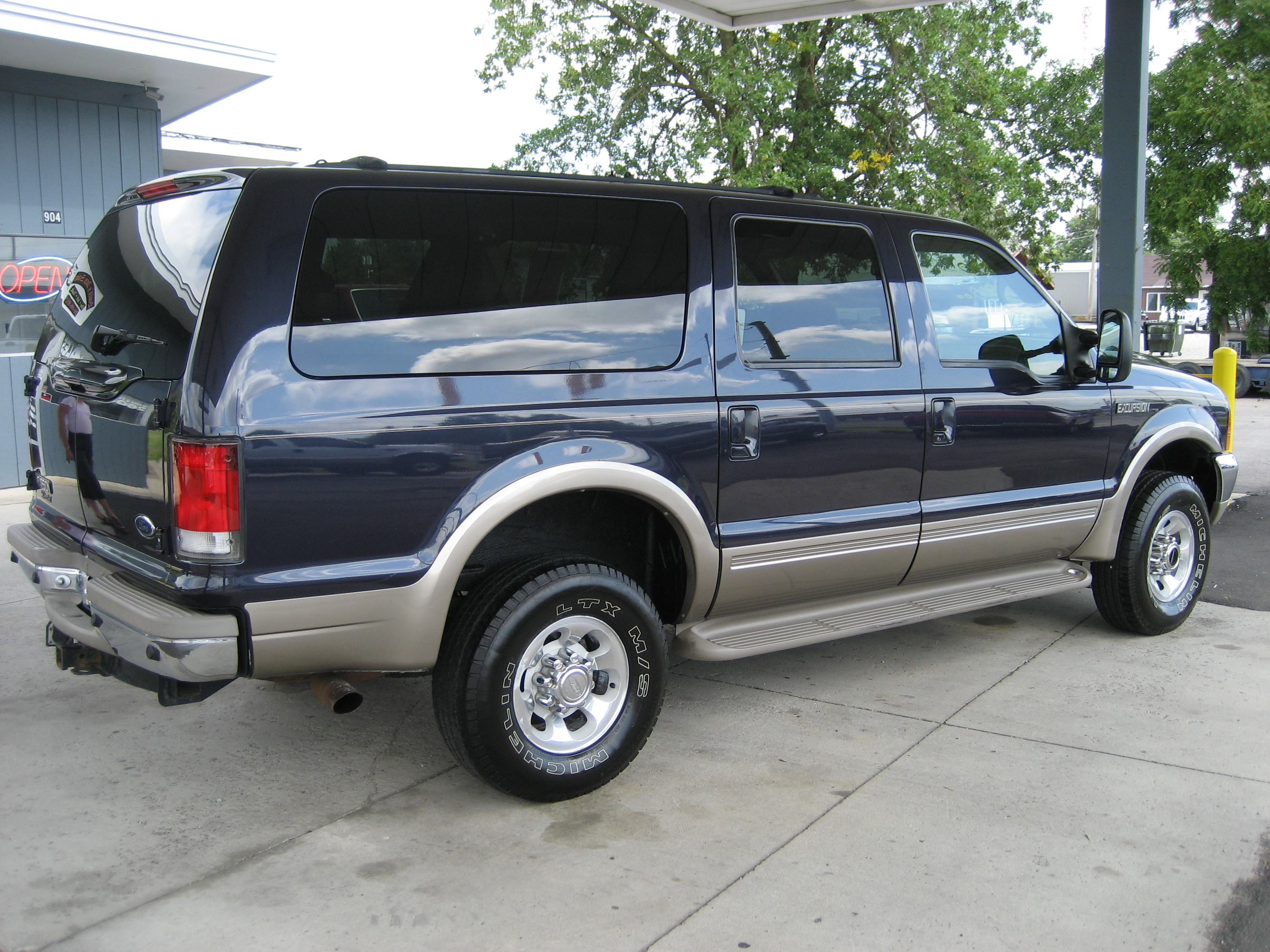
2001 Ford Excursion Limited, rear view

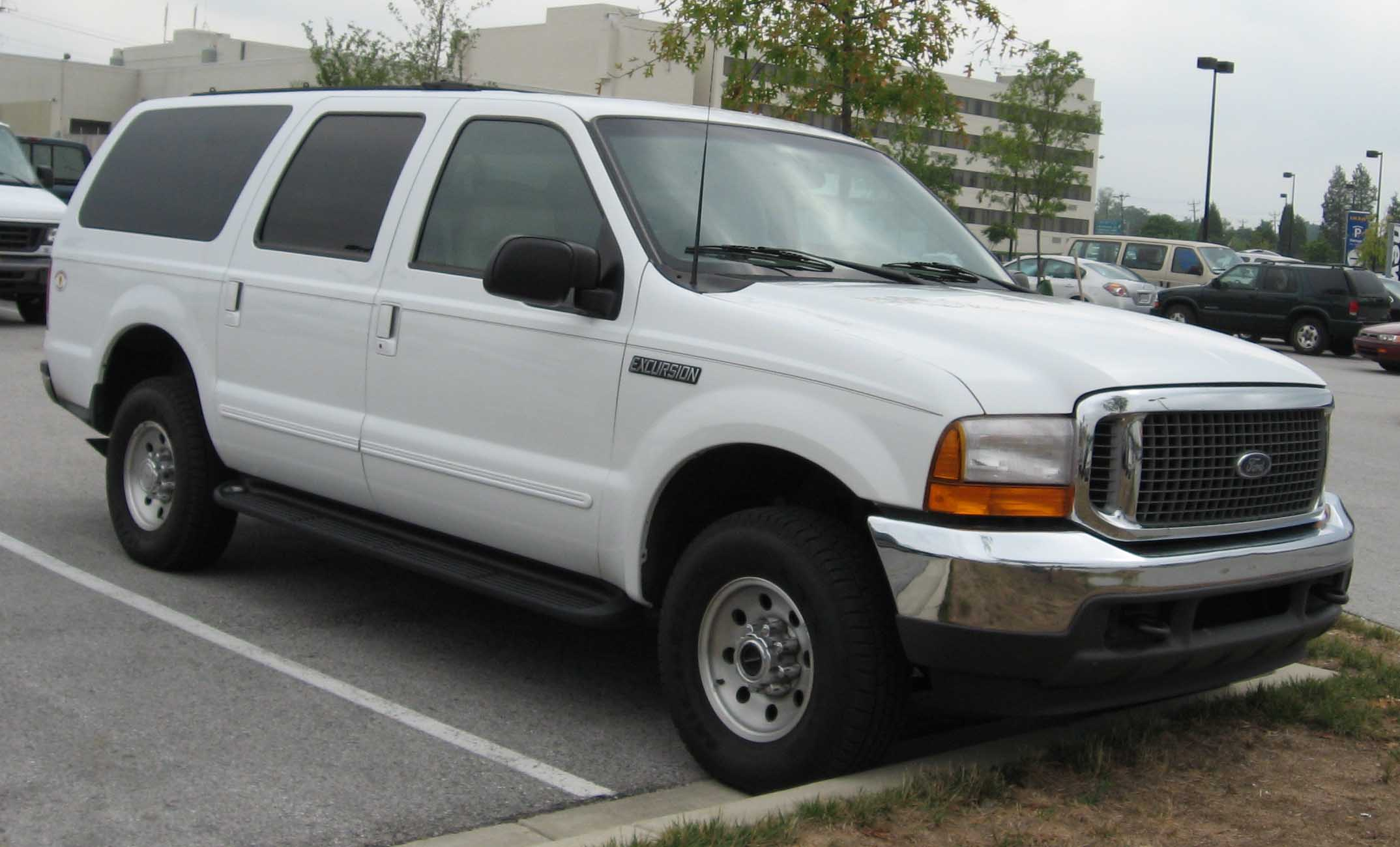
2001 Ford Excursion XLT

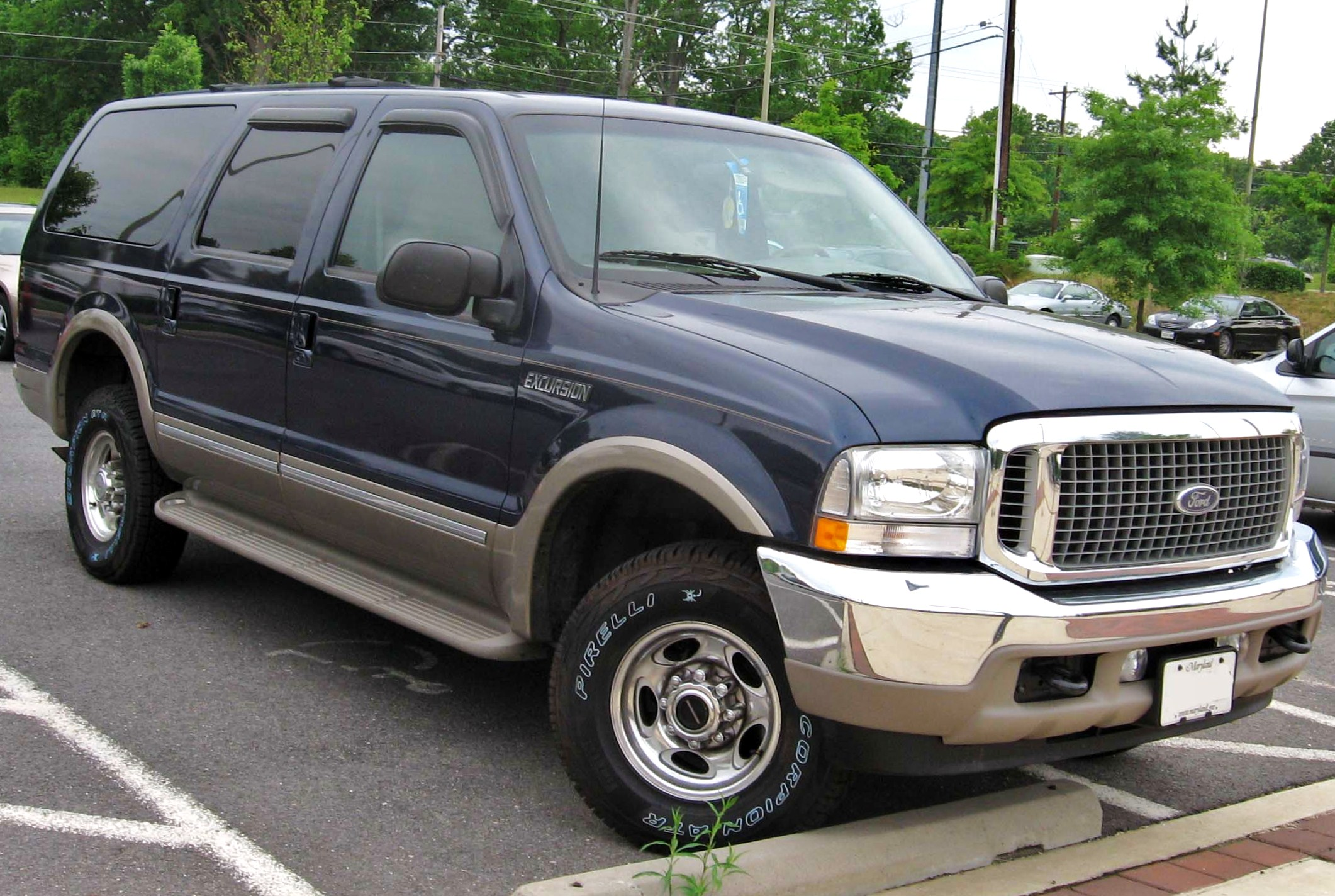
2002 Ford Excursion Limited

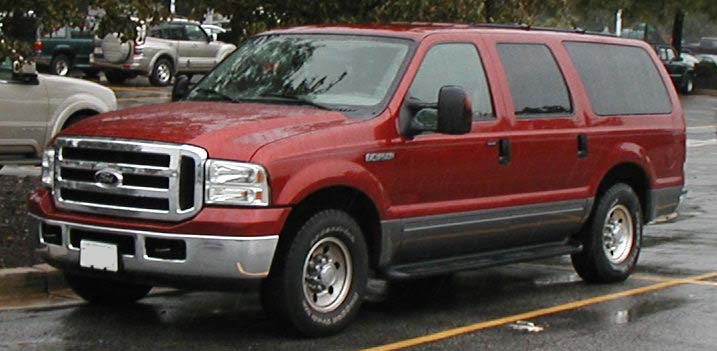
2005 Ford Excursion XLT

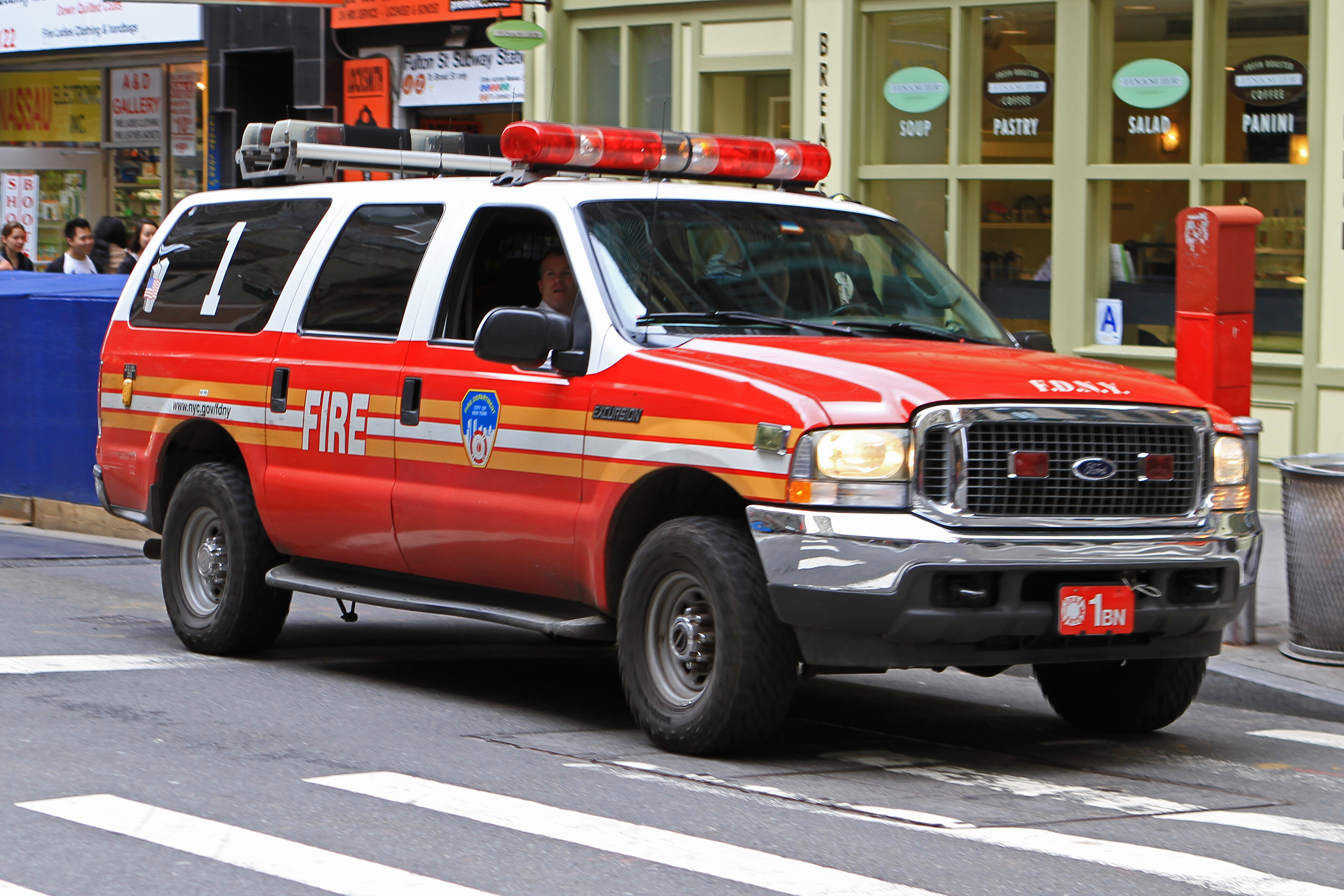
Ford Excursion XLS (FDNY Battalion Chief vehicle)

=== Trim ===
The Excursion adopted the trim nomenclature of the Ford light trucks marketed in North America. The base trim was XL (marketed nearly exclusively for fleet sales), XLT (standard trim in retail markets), and Limited (highest trim line). Following its use across many Ford light trucks, an Eddie Bauer trim package was introduced for the Excursion for 2003 (differing from the Limited primarily in appearance).

XLT: Included three rows of seating, leather-wrapped steering wheel with speed control, a security system, keyless entry, 16 in (41 cm) chrome steel rims or optional alloy rims, trailer towing package, an AM/FM radio with cassette and single-disc CD player with six premium speakers, and air conditioning.

Limited: Included same features as XLT, but adds a power driver's seat, rear audio controls, illuminated running boards, 16 in (41 cm) alloy rims, front-speed sensitive windshield wipers, five power points, ten cupholders, leather seats (with heated first row), and an optional rear entertainment system with DVD player.

== Reception ==
Being launched on September 30, 1999, the 2000 Ford Excursion was described by Popular Science as the "biggest sport utility on the planet." This would be the most successful model year for the Excursion, with nearly 69,000 examples sold. After essentially meeting sales projections at its launch, demand dropped in part because of the energy crisis of the 2000s. Annual production capacity was 70,000, but sales from 2001 barely reach half that number and the model become the lowest-selling SUV marketed by Ford or Lincoln-Mercury.

The large size of the Excursion led to it being dubbed the Ford Valdez by the Sierra Club in 1999 (in reference to the Exxon Valdez supertanker). In 2007, Time selected it as one of the "Fifty Worst Cars of All Time."

== Variants ==
=== F-250 Tropivan ===
From 1998 to 2012, an aftermarket SUV conversion of the Ford F-250 was sold in Brazil. Similar in design and layout to the Excursion, the F-250 Tropivan differed primarily by its assembly as a second-party conversion (similar to the Centurion Classic). In contrast to the Excursion, two different wheelbases of the Tropivan were produced.

As with all Super Duty trucks in Brazil, the Tropivan had a different engine selection throughout its production run, including a 4.2 L Essex gasoline V6 and two types of diesels: a 3.9 L Cummins B-series and the 4.2 L MWM Sprint 6.07TCA straight-6.

=== Aftermarket ===
During and since its production, the Excursion has become a basis for several types of aftermarket vehicles. As a result of its body commonality with the Super Duty model range, the bodywork of the Excursion led to aftermarket conversions of Ford medium-duty truck chassis (Ford F-650 and F-750) to SUVs; to accommodate the longer wheelbase, the body was typically modified with an extra set of doors.

At the other end of the size scale, the Hennessey VelociRaptor SUV was created by mating the rear bodywork of the Excursion with the bodywork of the first-generation Ford Raptor (a practice similar to the creation of the 1990s Centurion Classic C350).

Because the Excursion shares significant design commonality with the 1999 through 2016 Ford F-250, the SUV has been customized by replacing the 2000-2005 front bodywork with the bodywork of 2008–2016 Super Duty pickup trucks.

The Excursion also has served as a basis for stretch limousines. Though Ford imposed a 120-inch length limit on body extensions (on full-frame cars such as the Lincoln Town Car), some Excursions have undergone longer extensions. One such stretched 2001 Excursion was involved in the 2018 Schoharie limousine crash, which killed 20.

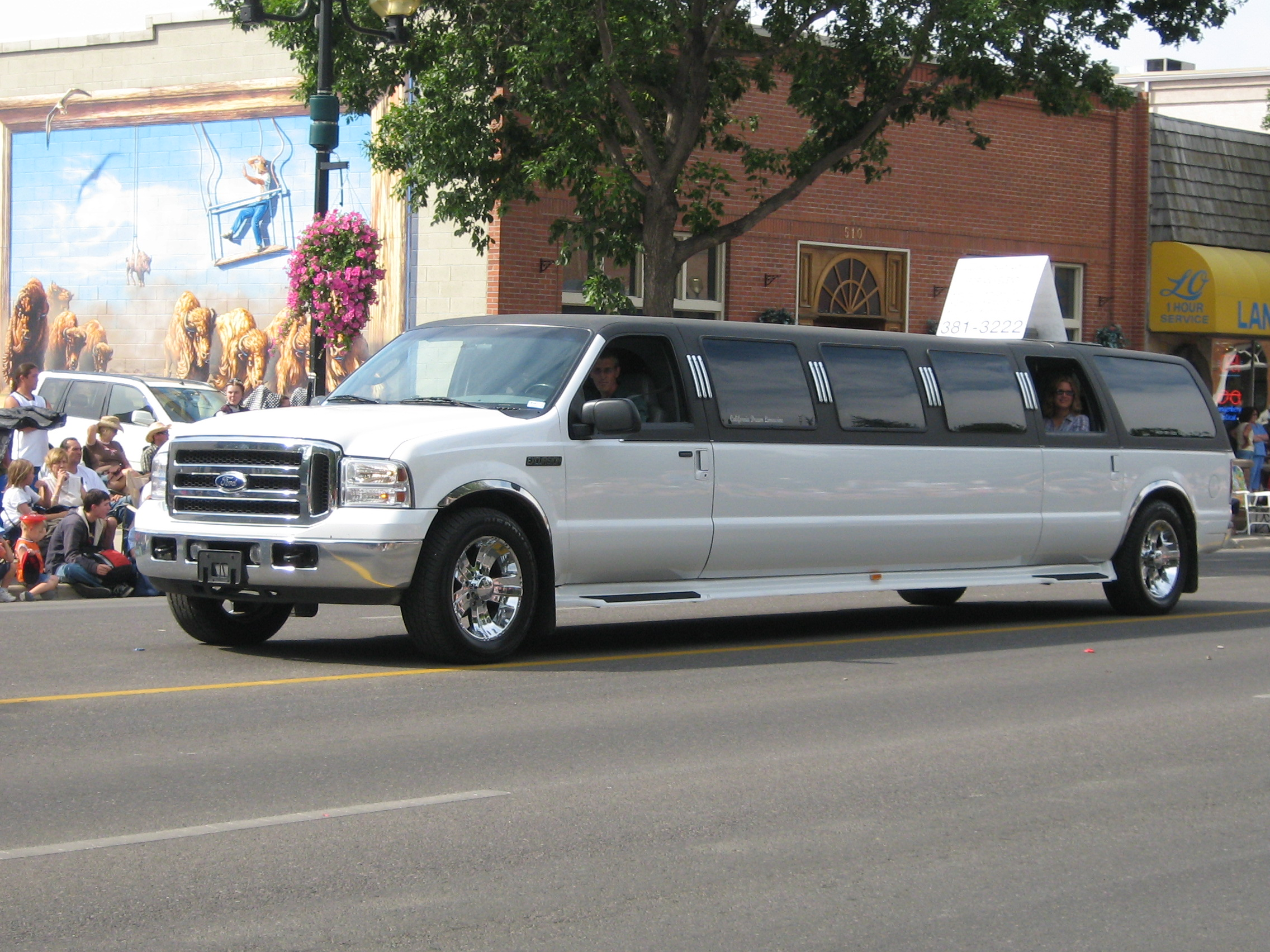
Ford Excursion stretch limousine

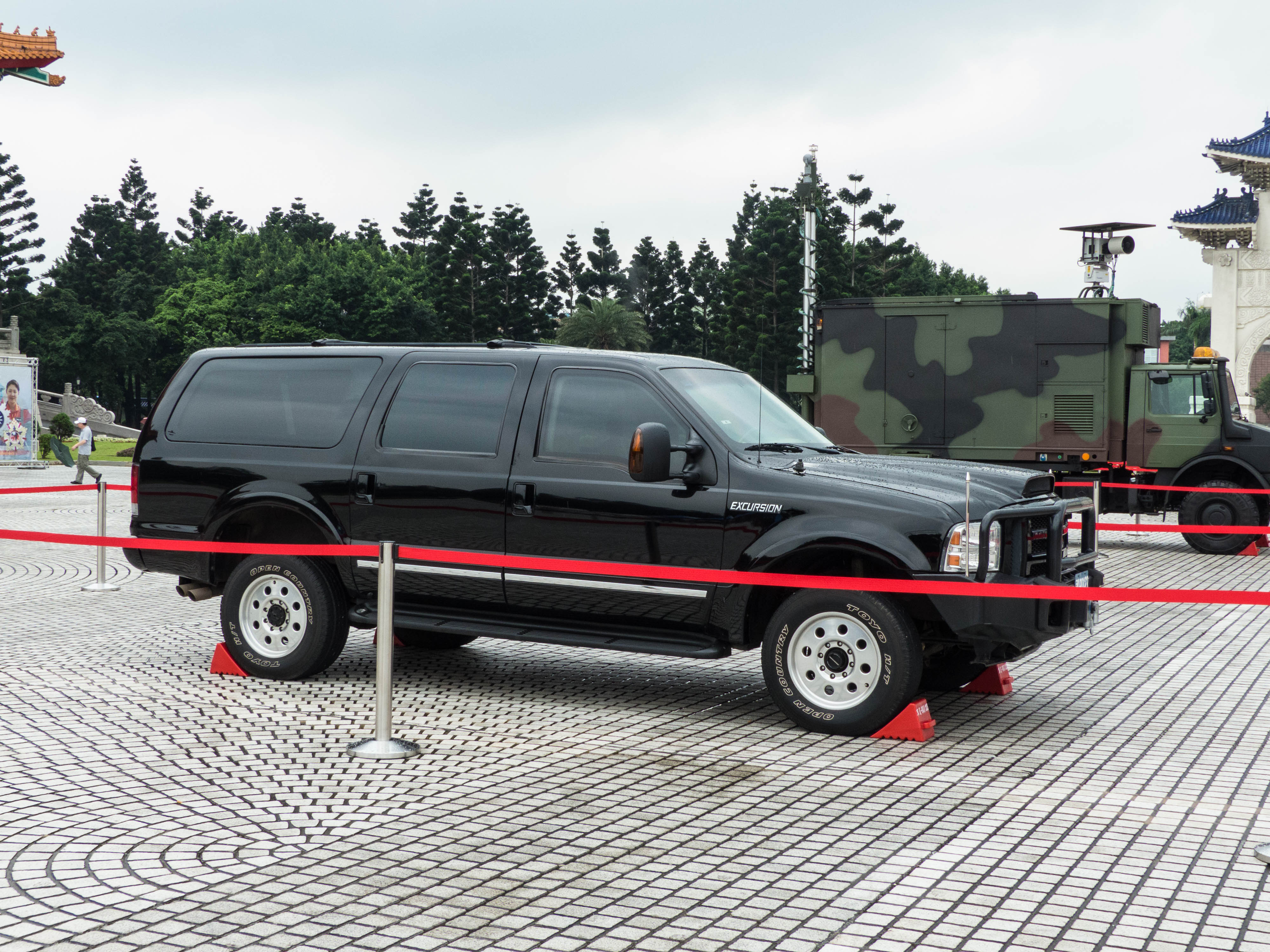
Ford Excursion armored car in use by the Taiwanese military police

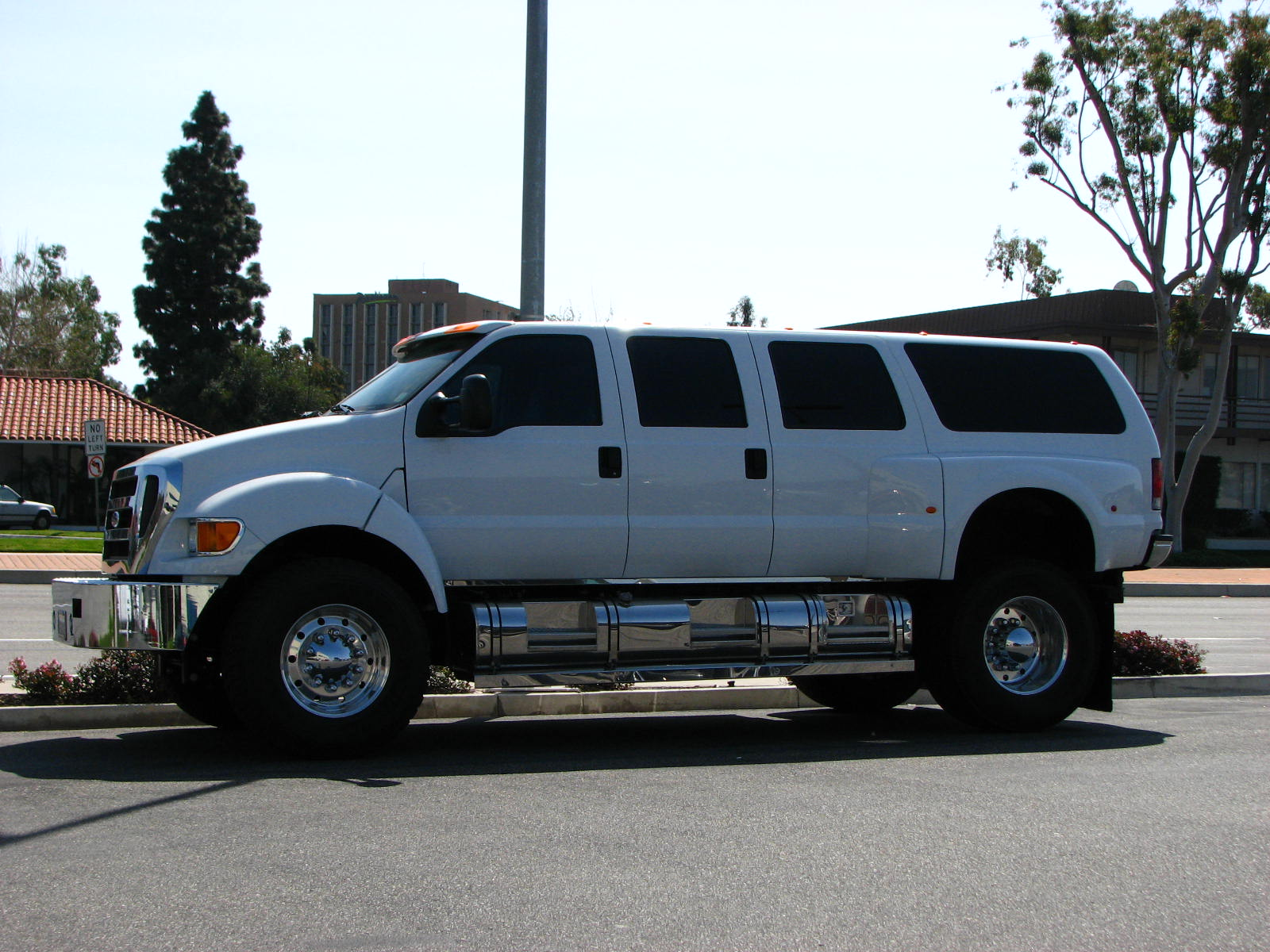
6-door Ford F-650 Super Duty SUV in Australia (Ford Excursion bodywork)

== Yearly U.S. sales ==
Calendar Year	Total American sales
1999	18,315
2000	50,786
2001	34,710
2002	29,042
2003	26,259
2004	20,010
2005	16,283
