= Les Dégonflés =

Les Dégonflés is a French vigilante group launched in 2005 that deflates tyres on SUVs parked on the streets of Paris in order to protest against their sales and the associated high emissions and damage caused to the environment.

They aim to deflate forty tires per week and their actions were not considered to be crimes since property was not damaged.
