= Crash incompatibility =

Imbalance of damage in two-car crashes

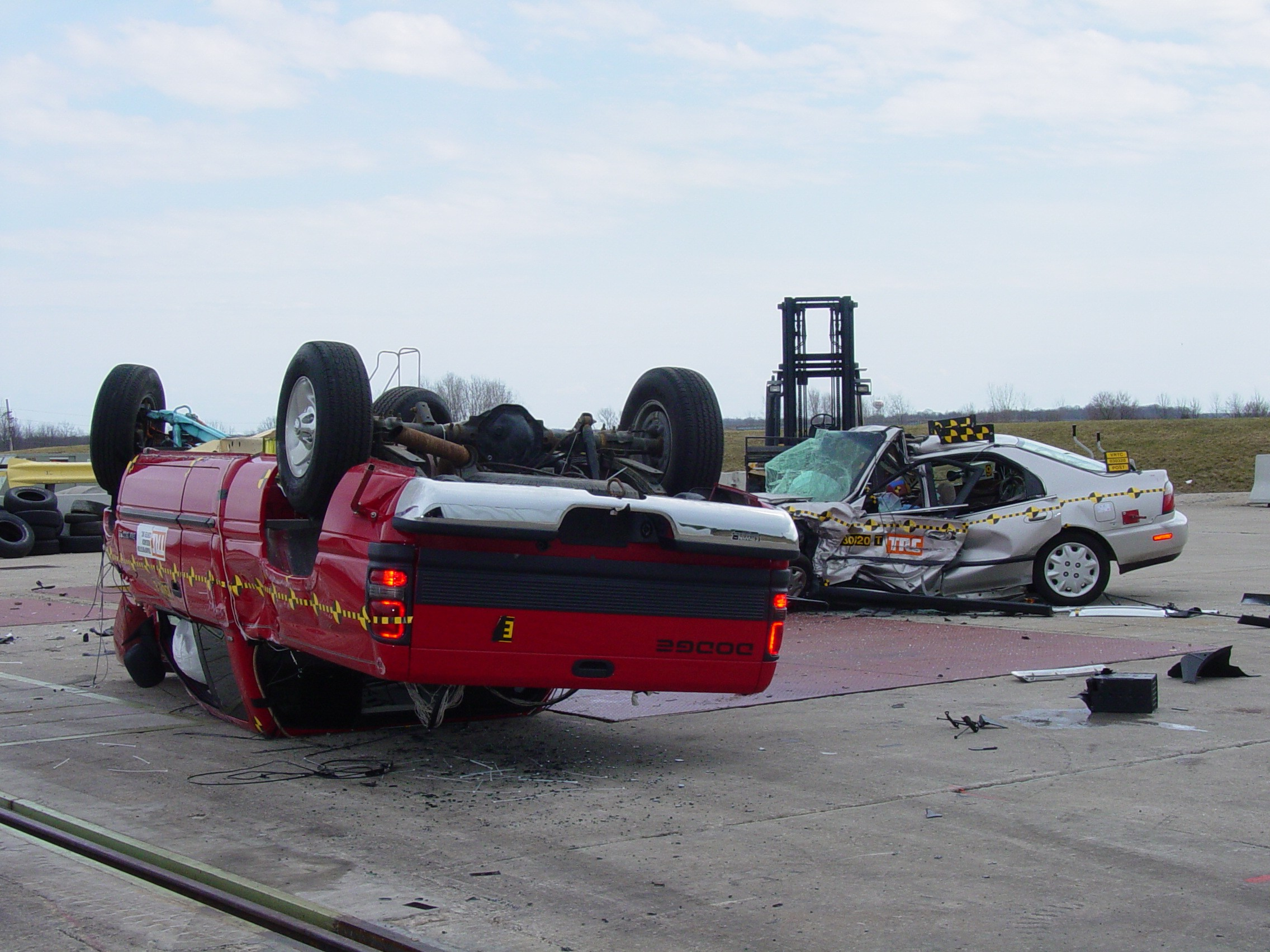
Aftermath of a compatibility test involving a 2001 Dodge Ram 1500 and a 1997 Honda Accord.

Crash incompatibility, crash compatibility, vehicle incompatibility, and vehicle compatibility are terms in the automobile crash testing industry. They refer to the tendency of some vehicles to inflict more damage on another vehicle (the "crash partner vehicle") in two-car crashes. Vehicle incompatibility is said to lead to more dangerous, fatal crashes, while compatibility can prevent injury in otherwise comparable crashes.

== Causes ==
The most obvious source of crash incompatibility is mass; a high-mass vehicle such as a large MPV or SUV will tend to cause much more serious damage in a crash with a lighter vehicle such as a typical sedan or compact car. In particular, research by Michael Anderson and Maximilian Auffhammer suggests that "controlling for own-vehicle weight, being hit by a vehicle that is 1,000 pounds heavier generates a 40-50% increase in fatality risk." Incompatibility may also result from the specific shape, stiffness, or other design aspects of the impacting vehicles. For example, some SUVs and pickup trucks ride higher than cars and lack crumple zones to absorb impact energy. Another source of incompatibility is that heavier vehicles are required to have stronger front ends because of today's test requirements like the NCAP test.

The National Highway Traffic Safety Administration has done studies of the "aggressiveness" of vehicle designs. The term "aggressiveness" is used to denote the average injury risk a vehicle imposes on occupants of other vehicles during collisions. A 2003 NHTSA study estimated that in vehicle to vehicle crashes, the design of minivans was 1.16 times as aggressive as cars, pickups were 1.39 times more aggressive, and SUVs were 1.71 times more aggressive than cars. When weight was included in the analysis, light trucks (including SUVs) were estimated to be 3.3 times more aggressive than cars in head-on crashes and perhaps more so in side impact crashes.

=== Controversy ===
These studies have been controversial as they affect public perception and policy decisions on CAFE standards and light truck safety test standards as they exist today. NHTSA does not define a car or a light truck based on weight (e.g., the Chrysler PT Cruiser is classified as a light truck whereas a Lexus LS 600h L, a vehicle that weighs 66% more per published specifications, is classified as a car). So while there have been no proposals to eliminate light trucks (which includes minivans, SUVs and pickups), doing so would not eliminate incompatibility because there would still be lighter vehicles crashing into heavier vehicles.

== Solutions ==
There has been extensive research and testing done by NHTSA, other governments, research organizations as well as automobile manufacturers to find solutions that improve safety in the small cars when colliding with larger vehicles. In the United States, a group of experts proposed major steps to improve compatibility and these have been accepted as a voluntary regulation by American automotive manufacturers as well as by most other companies selling vehicles in the U.S. The Canadian government has also accepted these recommendations. The recommendations require all manufacturers to either (a) lower the height of the primary structure (also called frame rail) of all SUV and pickup trucks so that they overlap the primary structure of the cars; or (b) add another structure (called Secondary Energy Absorbing Structure) to the SUVs and pickup truck that cannot meet the first option. Latest studies have shown that these have improved the safety in cars when struck by SUVs. However, no such benefit has been observed in pickup truck to car crashes. It is unclear whether or not certain aftermarket modifications are taken into account, such as "lift kits" which raise the frame or suspension of a vehicle for increased ground clearance. Such modifications would likely greatly reduce the effectiveness of modern auto-safety advances due to causing the rigid parts of a pickup or SUV to strike the weaker parts of lower vehicles, rather than the reinforced regions in an accident. State laws regarding the use of such modifications vary widely, and many have laws that aren't enforced. As of now, there are no Federal laws regarding the bumper height of trucks and SUV's.

== History ==
Although much of the crash incompatibility debate in recent years has centered on SUVs, the concept has been around far longer. When subcompact cars were introduced in the 1970s, there was a fear that incompatibilities of mass and design could lead to more serious injuries for drivers of these smaller, lighter vehicles. Crash incompatibility remains an area of active study.

== See also ==
- Car safety
- Insurance Institute for Highway Safety
- Driver safety arms race
