= Autobesity =

Trend towards increasing size of cars

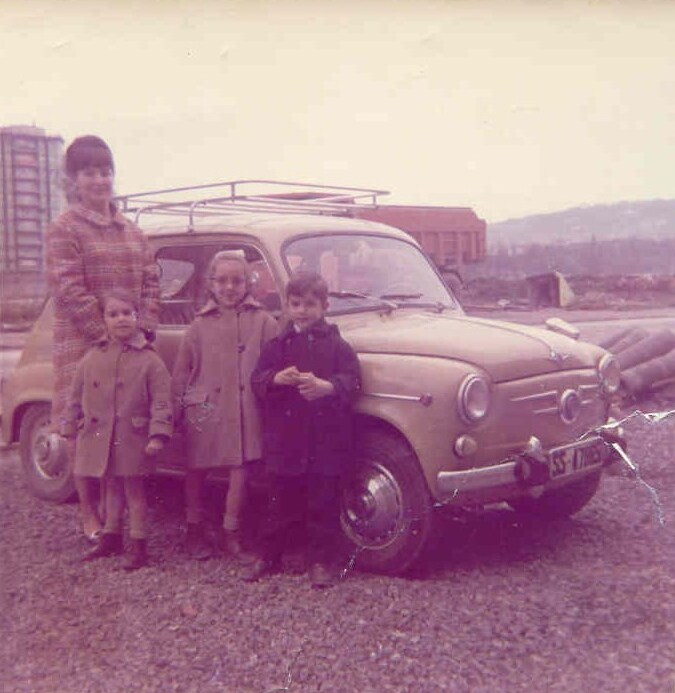
The SEAT 600, at about 600 kg (1,300 lb) and three meters in length, was the best-selling car in Spain in the 1950s and 1960s.

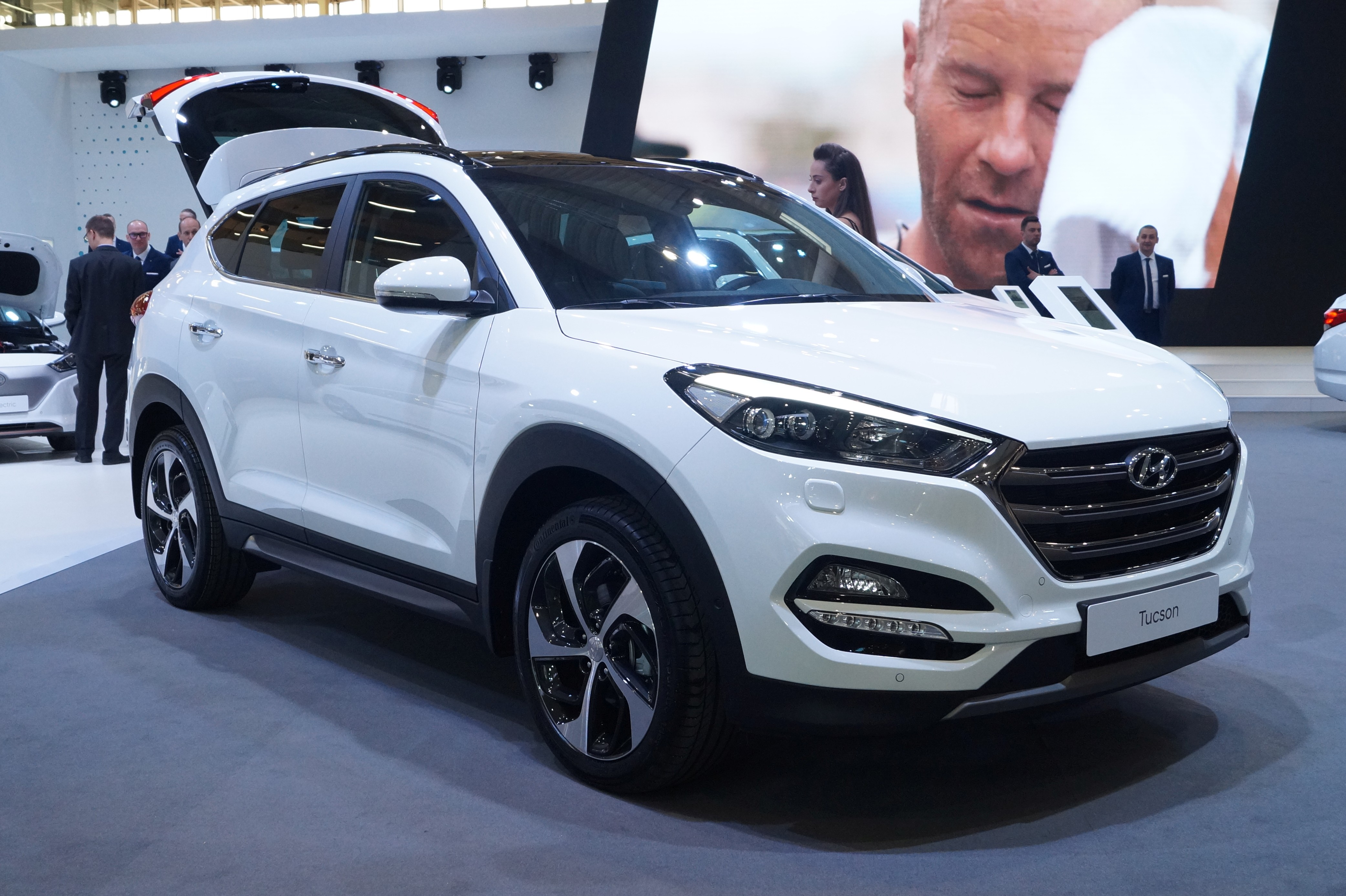
The Hyundai Tucson SUV was the best-selling vehicle in Spain in 2022. It can weigh over 1,800 kg (4,000 lb) and measure over 4.5 m (15 ft) in length.

The size and weight of automobiles have increased over the past few decades.

Trucks' share of US vehicles produced, has tripled since 1975. Though vehicle fuel efficiency has increased within each category, the overall trend toward less efficient types of vehicles has offset some of the benefits of greater fuel economy and reduction in carbon dioxide emissions. Without the shift towards SUVs, energy use per unit distance could have fallen 30% more than it did from 2010 to 2022.

In the U.S., pickup trucks have grown in size and function, from workhorses to family vehicles with many technological features. By the 2010s, small pickups had nearly vanished and in the 2020s full-size trucks made up a majority of U.S. sales. Safety advocates are concerned with larger trucks' mass and driver blind spots.

Autobesity, also known as car bloat, truck bloat and carspreading, is the trend, beginning in about the 1990s, of cars increasing in average size and weight. The average weight of cars sold in Europe increased by 21% between 2001 and 2022. In the United States, SUVs and pickup trucks comprised more than 75% of new sales in 2024 compared to 38% in 2009.

The driver safety arms race is a phenomenon whereby car drivers are incentivized to buy larger auto-vehicles in order to protect themselves against other large auto-vehicles. This has a spiralling effect whereby cars get increasingly larger, which has adverse overall effects on traffic safety. It is an example of a prisoners' dilemma, as it can be individually rational to attain larger vehicles while having adverse outcomes on all traffic users.

== Consequences ==
Among the consequences of increased car weight and size are:

- Poorer air quality, even with electric vehicles, because heavier vehicles have higher energy consumption and release more tyre and brake particles (non-exhaust emissions).
- Reduced road safety, as heavier vehicles have greater kinetic energy, and taller vehicles are more likely to strike pedestrians in the head and torso, or even not be able to see small children who are below the driver's line of sight. Larger vehicles also have longer stopping distances, making it harder to avoid collisions by braking and tending to make the collisions that do happen happen at higher speeds. Additionally, larger vehicles are more likely to hit pedestrians when turning due to poorer visibility. Vehicles with higher front ends and blunt profiles are 45% more likely to cause fatalities in crashes with pedestrians than smaller cars and trucks. In the United States, pedestrian fatalities increased by 57% between 2013 and 2022.
- Parking issues for other vehicles, as they don't fit in typical parking spaces, often occupying multiple spaces.
- Increased consumption of public space, promoting more sprawling cities and further exacerbating energy and automobile dependency.
- Heavier vehicles increase road wear.

== Explanations ==
The underlying incentive of the arms race is crash incompatibility, which refers to the tendency of some vehicles to inflict significantly more damage on another vehicle in a two-car crash. The primary source of this incompatibility is a disparity in mass. A heavier vehicle, such as an SUV or pickup truck, will cause much more serious damage in a crash with a lighter vehicle like a sedan. Research by Michael Anderson and Maximilian Auffhammer suggests that "controlling for own-vehicle weight, being hit by a vehicle that is 1,000 pounds heavier generates a 40-50% increase in fatality risk."

Incompatibility also results from vehicle design. SUVs and pickup trucks often ride higher than cars, and their structural stiffness can be mismatched with smaller vehicles. The National Highway Traffic Safety Administration (NHTSA) studies the "aggressiveness" of vehicles, defined as the average injury risk a vehicle imposes on occupants of other vehicles. A 2003 NHTSA study found that, compared to cars, minivans were 1.16 times as aggressive, pickups were 1.39 times more aggressive, and SUVs were 1.71 times more aggressive. When accounting for weight, light trucks (including SUVs) were estimated to be 3.3 times more aggressive than cars in head-on crashes.

An individual driver may choose a large car for personal safety, though it threatens other road users. This in turn pushes others to choose large cars, creating a vicious circle. A US National Safety Council expert described autobesity as an "arms race".

Even though this is a decisive factor that some buyers do take into account, even the ones who don't actively search for larger vehicles are affected due to the increase in the number of safety features from airbags to crumple zones. These require much more space in the vehicle, even adding areas of apparently empty space just so that the bodywork has a larger crumple zone in case of a collision.

== Government actions ==
- France, Norway, the Netherlands and Washington, D.C. (among others) tax vehicles by weight.
- A 2023 European Parliament report proposes introducing a new "category B+" driving licence for cars heavier than 1,800 kg (4,000 lb).
- From 2024, Paris will charge higher parking fees for SUVs.
- In September 2024, the US National Highway Traffic Safety Administration proposed a rule mandating manufacturers to test their vehicles using pedestrian crash test dummies, with an estimate of saving 67 pedestrian lives per year.
- In 2025, Cardiff council increased the cost of parking permits for vehicles weighing more than 2,400 kilograms (5,300 lb), with plans to lower the weight threshold over time.
