= CelebrityNetWorth =

Website on celebrity finances

- Website type: Private
- Founded: October 2008; 18 years ago
- Headquarters: Chicago, Illinois, US
- Founder: Brian Warner
- Key people: Alex Chan
- Employees: 1-50
- Website: www.celebritynetworth.com
- Current status: Online

CelebrityNetWorth is a website which reports estimates of the total assets and financial activities of celebrities. It is operated by Corte Lodato LLC, which was founded by its CEO Brian Warner in 2008.

The website has been criticized for a lack of transparency for its calculations, with no way to verify the accuracy of the figures.

== Activities ==
CelebrityNetWorth creates web pages that list a celebrity's name, a short biography, and estimates of net worth and salary. The site claims to calculate net worth based on "a proprietary algorithm" based on publicly available information, although, according to The New York Times, there are no computer scientists in their employment. Warner has said of their estimates that "If we end up too far off, there is always some kind of backlash. There have been a handful of cases when we’ve been proved to be off, and we’ve corrected it". The site also provides news articles on financial transactions of celebrities such as the purchase of a home or lawsuits, which are written by freelancers.

CelebrityNetWorth also creates lists ranking wealthy individuals based upon their wealth. In 2012, the company compiled a list of the 25 richest people in history, adjusted for inflation, naming King Mansa Musa of the Mali Empire at the top of the list. That same year, it created a list of the world's richest DJs, and a survey which named Ringo Starr as the world's richest drummer.

== Interactions with Google ==
In 2014, Google requested permission from Warner to include CelebrityNetWorth's data in its Knowledge Graph. Warner declined. However, in February 2016, Google began using information from its search index of CelebrityNetWorth to display featured snippets with net worth at the top of their search result pages for relevant queries. The featured snippets were positioned above the search results, including results for CelebrityNetWorth. As a result, CelebrityNetWorth's web traffic declined by 65% from January 2016 to January 2017.

In July 2019, the site was asked to submit on-the-record testimony to the House Subcommittee on Antitrust as part of its investigation into Google's anti-competitive behavior. The testimony provided a timeline detailing Google's encroachment into CelebrityNetWorth's business through the use of scraped content and "Featured Snippet" answer boxes. The testimony made three primary arguments; 1) That Google used its market power as a monopoly to benefit itself while hurting competitors; 2) That Google's actions have had negative impacts on the open internet; and 3) That these actions harm everyday Internet consumers.

== Criticism ==
The website has been criticized for a lack of transparency for its calculations, with no way to verify the accuracy of the figures. A piece in The New York Times criticized CelebrityNetWorth's accuracy, describing news articles as "clickbait", noting that most content is written by freelance writers, rather than journalists or computer scientists that analyze data. Warner himself has said that the amount is "ballparked" rather than "dollar level accuracy." Despite this, numerous publications often cite the publication. The piece also noted signs of interference; after Geoffrey Owens was spotted working as a retail cashier, his previous net worth of $500K was revised to $300K.
