= CNW Marketing Research =

CNW Marketing Research, Inc.
- Company type: Private
- Industry: Marketing Research/Consulting
- Founded: 1984
- Defunct: 2015
- Fate: Dissolved by remaining founder
- Headquarters: Bandon, Oregon, United States
- Key people: Stephanie Yanez, Art Spinella
- Products: Publications, Data
- Services: Consulting, lease portfolio analysis, executive sessions
- Website: CNWMarketingResearch.com cnwmr.com

CNW Marketing Research, Inc. (CNWMR), known primarily as an automotive marketing research company, was a private company founded in 1984. It operated separate research offices covering the automotive, computer, electronics, housing, and personal investment industries, as well as a research office covering political issues. CNW was a reclusive firm and has been the subject of some controversy (see below), with subscribers in nine countries including government agencies, Wall Street brokerage houses and financial institutions. Major clients included Gannett Newspapers, Time Inc., Meredith Publishing (Better Homes et al.) as well as a long list of corporate clients.

The CNW stands for Coastal Northwest, a consumer magazine founded by Stephanie Yanez Spinella and husband Art Spinella, which was published for only one test issue. Beginning as Coastal Northwest Publishing Company in 1983, according to Art Spinella, it became CNW Marketing/Research in 1984. The slash was dropped with the advent of the internet, making its name CNW Marketing Research, Inc. As of February 2015, after the death of co-founder Art Spinella, the company has closed its doors, according to a statement from Stephanie Yanez Spinella on the main CNW site.

CNWMR performed research into consumer motivations and decisions in automotive purchases, and reports a variety of data related to market forecasting. The company's website states that its research and data publications are provided to more than 10,000 subscribers in print and on-line formats, with annual subscription prices list as beginning at $400. It publishes a monthly Retail Automotive Summary periodical, Home and Shelter Update newsletters, Purchase Path studies, sales forecasting and other industry analyses. Current leasing and other trends are tracked regularly through data gleaned from insurance companies, providing a unique data view used by the automotive industry, industry analysts and government agencies.

== Key personnel ==
Art Spinella was named automotive division president or company president in 2001, 2002, or 2003, according to various accounts, after serving as vice president and general manager since 1992. Often misattributed as the president in articles from 1992 through 2000, he was described as an auto leasing newsletter editor and director of automotive research at the company prior to 1992.

Stephanie Yanez is currently listed as the CEO, previously identified as president of CNWMR in 1995, until as recently as 2003.

== Offices ==
The company's website lists only a Bandon, Oregon P.O. Box as an address, and its "call centers, data center, and field offices are off limits" to clients and other visitors.

== Controversy ==
CNWMR's publication "From Dust to Dust" states that for the 2005 model year a Hummer H2 or H3 (but not the H1) is more efficient in terms of cost per lifetime mile than a Prius. While a Prius is one-third the weight of a Hummer and gets between four and six times better fuel economy, CNWMR argued the Hummer vehicles are built using less costly technology and are driven more over their lifetime. CNWMR calculates most expenses occur during construction and disposal, not during operation. Additionally, their efficiencies are based on Priuses lasting fifteen years during which their owners drive only an average of 109,000 mi (175,000 km) whilst CNWMR expects Hummers to be driven more than 300,000 mi (480,000 km) over their lifespan. Arguments against the claim call the methods of analysis that produced these figures questionable. CNWMR responded to many of these questions with more details about their methods.

CNWMR has since added data for 2007–2008 model year cars in the June 2008 release of their "From Dust to Dust" study and the Prius cost per lifetime mile fell 23.5% to $2.191 per lifetime mile while the H3 cost rose 12.5% to $2.327 per lifetime mile. The Prius and smaller hybrids in general now cost less per mile than any large SUV, but still more than most normal 'economy' cars according to their own data.
