= BYD Song L =

BYD Song L can refer to 2 SUVs by BYD Auto:

- BYD Song L EV, a battery electric SUV
- BYD Song L DM-i, a plug-in hybrid SUV
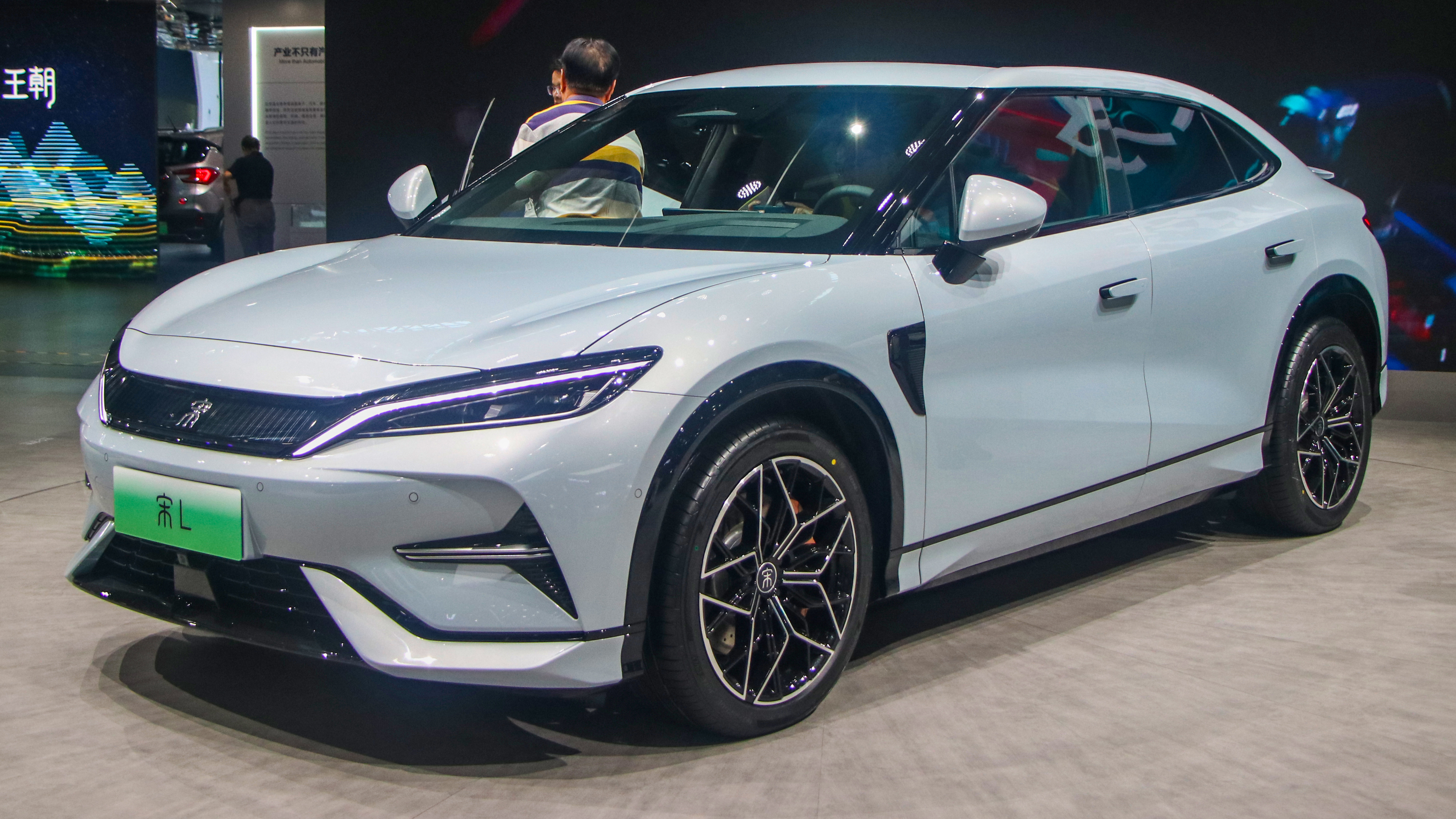
BYD Song L EV

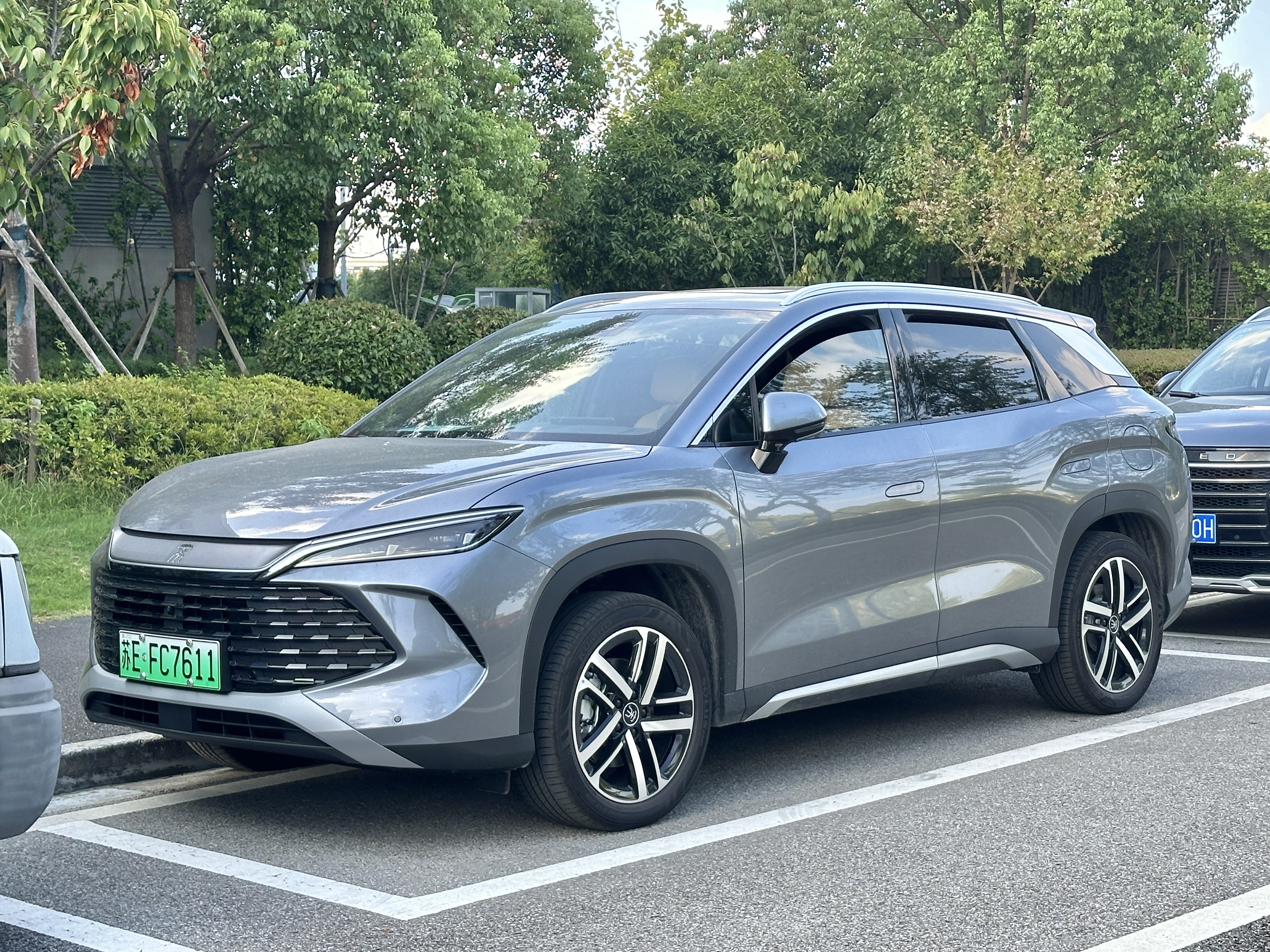
BYD Song L DM-i
