= BYD Seal 07 =

Full-size sedan

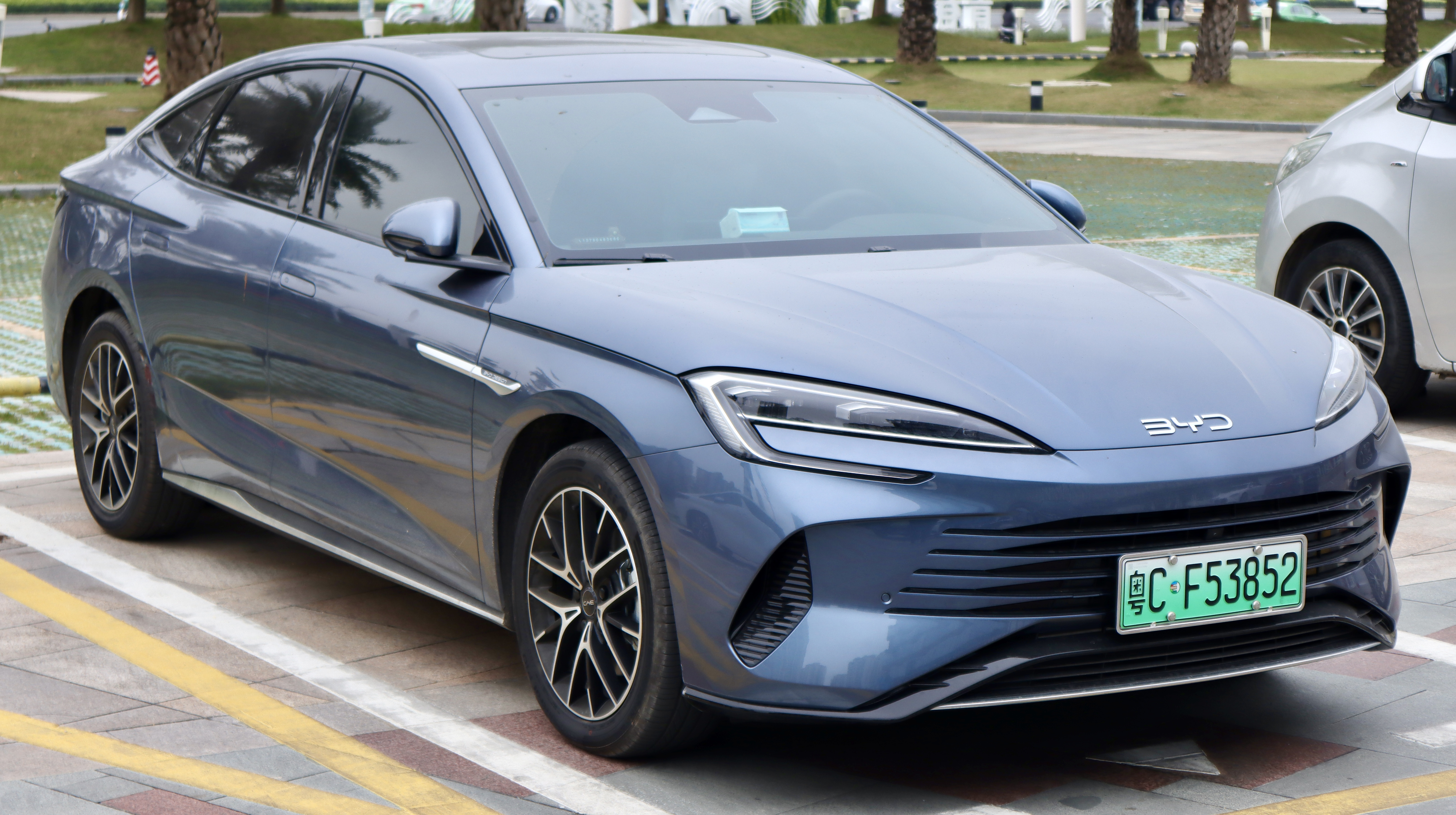

Overview
- Manufacturer: BYD Auto
- Production: July 2023 – present

Body and chassis
- Class: Full-size car (E-segment)
- Body style: 4-door sedan

The BYD Seal 07 (Chinese: 比亚迪海豹07; pinyin: Bǐyǎdí Hǎibào 07), previously the BYD Seal DM-i until 2024, is a full-size sedan manufactured by BYD Auto since 2023. It was only available as a plug-in hybrid known as the Seal 07 DM-i until the 2026 model year, when a battery-electric version known as the Seal 07 EV was introduced.

== First generation (2023) ==
First generation
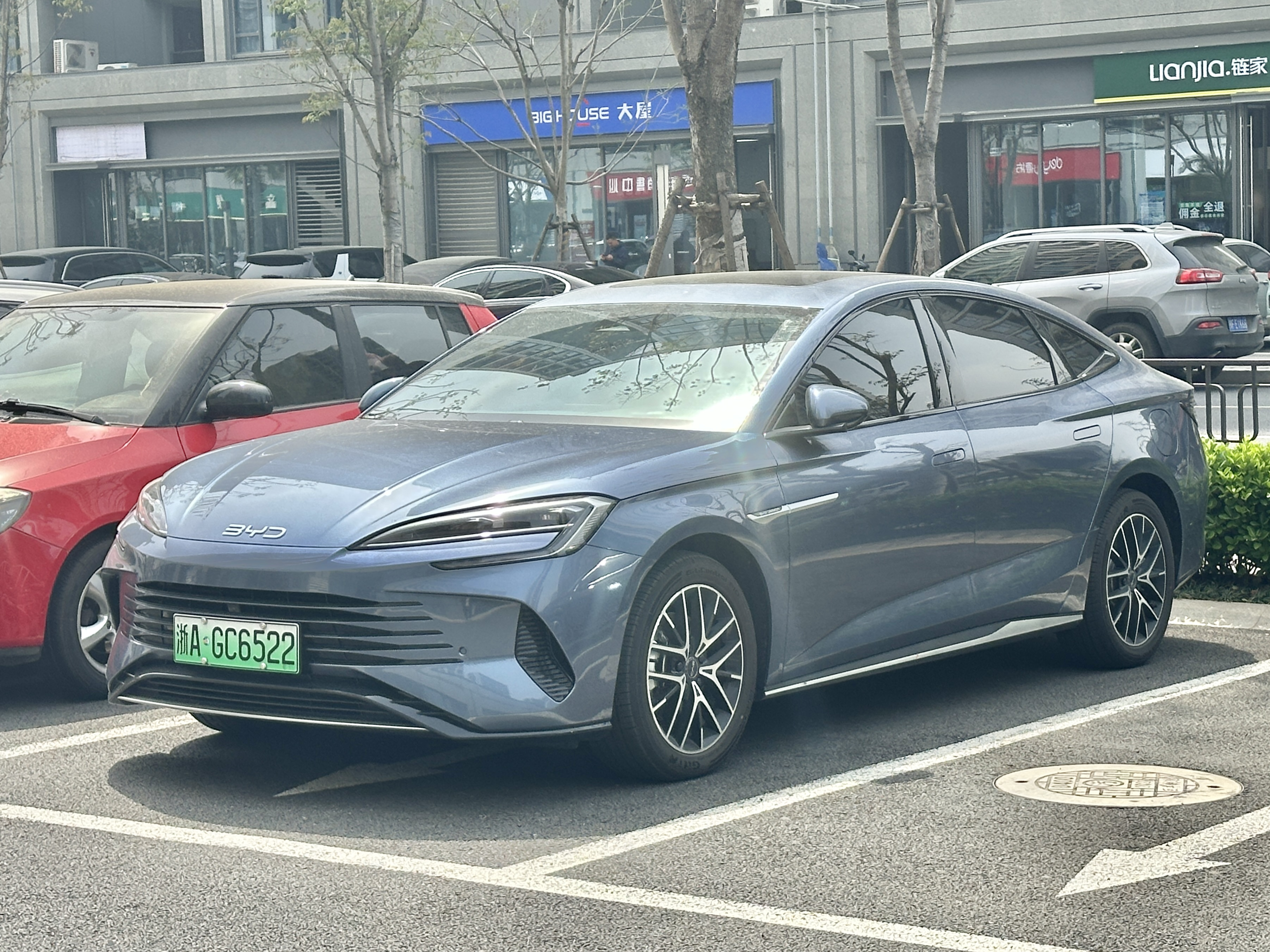

Overview
- Model code: HX
- Also called: BYD Seal DM-i (China, 2023–2024); BYD Seal 7 DM-i (export)
- Production: July 2023 – present
- Model years: 2023–2026 (DM-i, China); 2026 (EV, China)
- Assembly: China: Zhengzhou, Henan; Shenzhen, Guangdong; Hefei, Anhui; Jinan, Shandong
- Designer: Under the lead of Wolfgang Egger

Body and chassis
- Layout: Front-engine, front-motor, front-wheel drive (DM-i); Rear-motor, rear-wheel-drive (EV)
- Related: BYD Han

Powertrain
- Engine: Petrol plug-in hybrid: 1.5 L BYD472QA I4; 1.5 L BYD476ZQC I4 turbo
- Electric motor: AC Permanent magnet synchronus
- Transmission: E-CVT
- Hybrid drivetrain: Plug-in hybrid (DM-i)
- Battery: 17.6 kWh BYD Blade LFP (DM-i); 30.7 kWh BYD Blade LFP (DM-i); 69.0 kWh BYD Blade LFP (EV)

Dimensions
- Wheelbase: 2,900 mm (114.2 in)
- Length: 4,980 mm (196.1 in); 4,995 mm (196.7 in) (facelift)
- Width: 1,890 mm (74.4 in); 1,900 mm (74.8 in) (facelift)
- Height: 1,495 mm (58.9 in)
- Curb weight: 1,795–1,900 kg (3,957–4,189 lb)

=== History ===
The Seal DM-i was first introduced as a prototype at 2023 Auto Shanghai named the BYD Destroyer 07 and was planned to be the third product of the Warship Series model line. However, plans were changed in July 2023 just months before launch and it was launched as the Seal DM-i instead, to integrate it with the Seal series of sedans.

=== Overview ===
Sold through Ocean Network dealerships, the Seal DM-i is positioned in the BYD's range as an alternative to the similar BYD Han, which belongs to Dynasty Network dealerships. It went on sale in September 2023 in China.

The stylistic design by Wolfgang Egger was maintained in the next generation of aesthetics already known from the electric Seal, distinguished, among others, muscular wheel arches, slim roofline and boomerang-shaped headlights. The rear lamps took the shape of water drops, dominating the band in the composition with a chrome strip. The cabin has a design identical to other models in BYD's Ocean Series product line. The central element of the dashboard is the 15.6-inch touchscreen of the multimedia system.

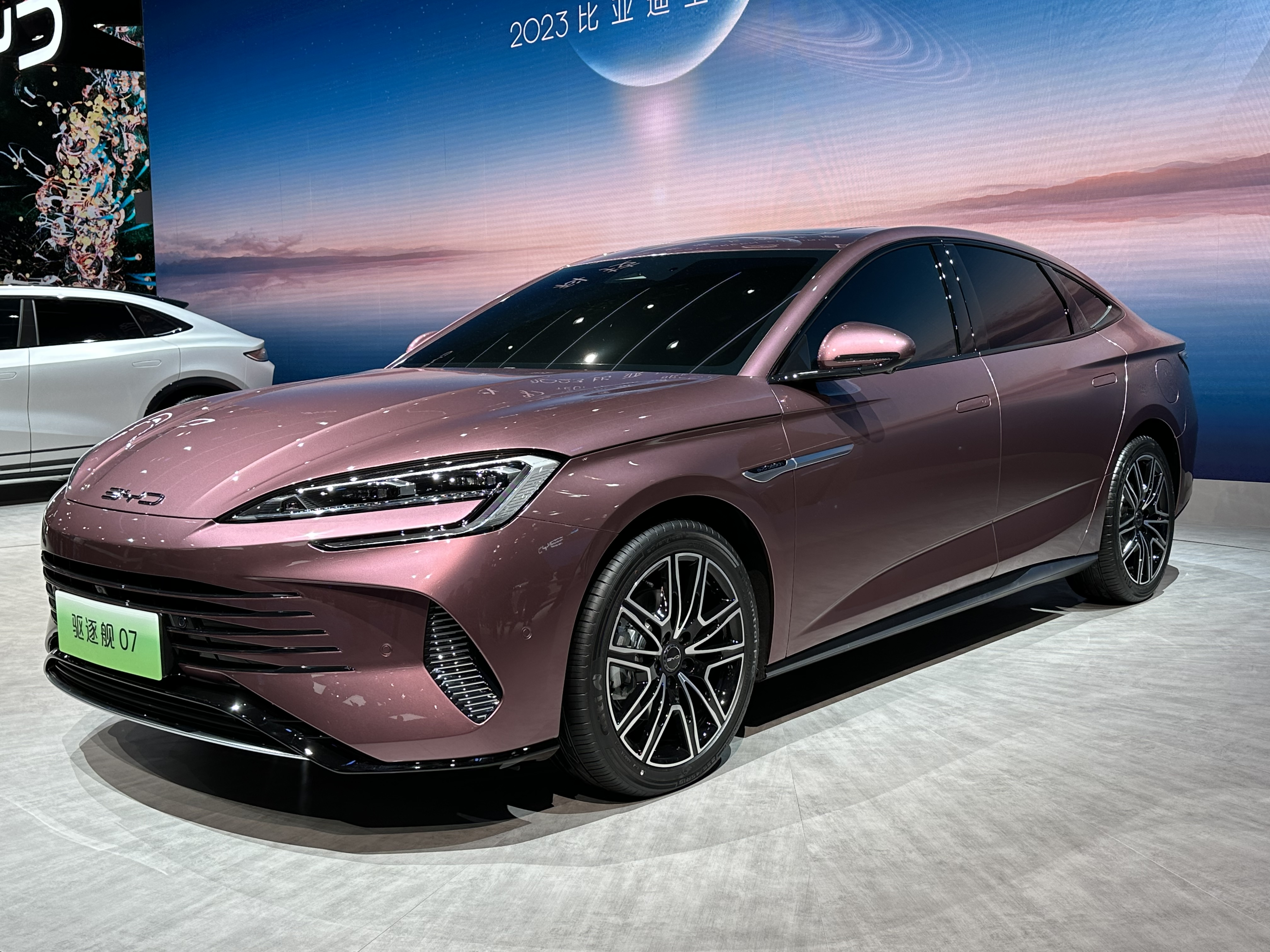
BYD Destroyer 07 (near-production model)

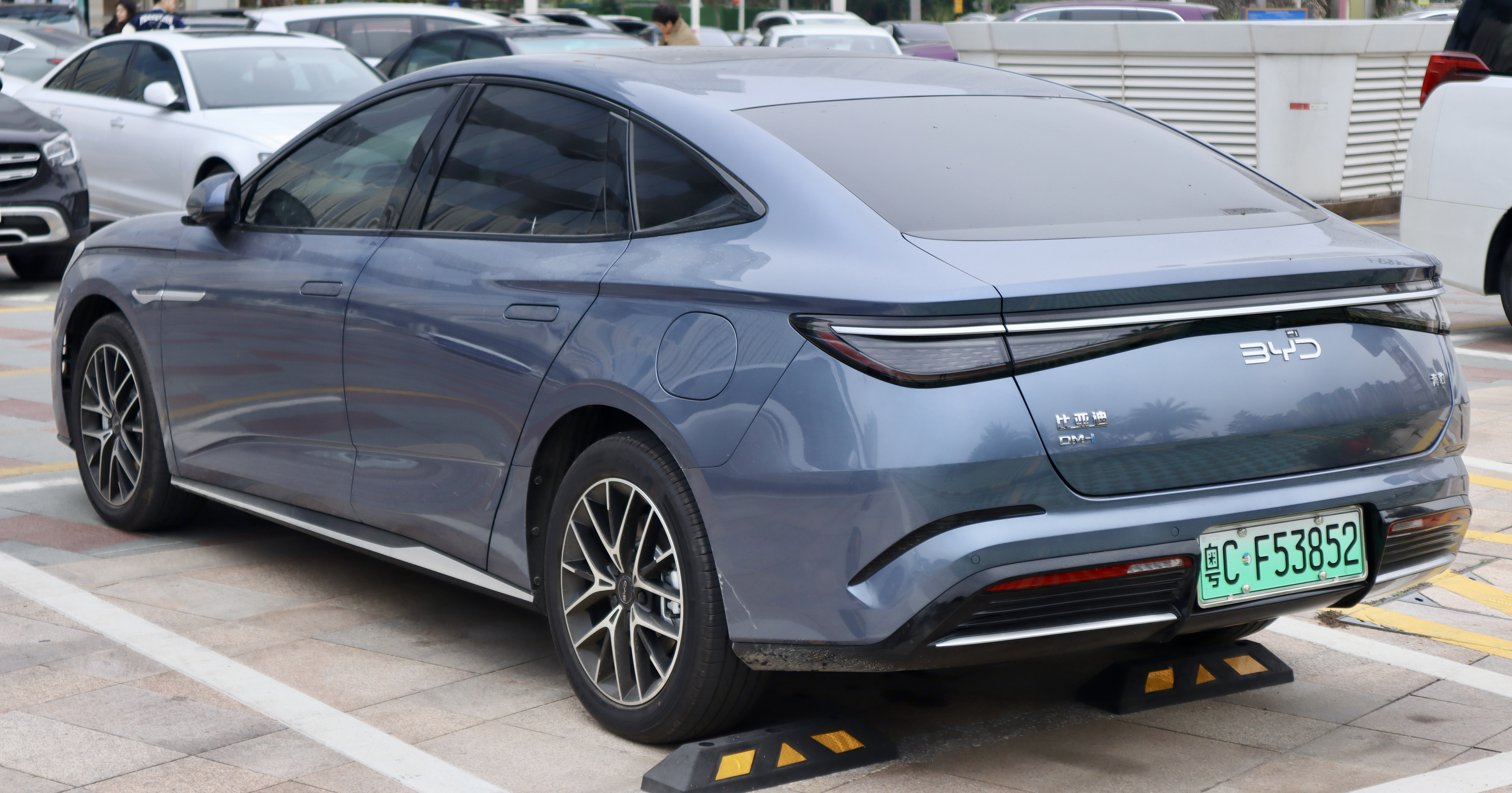
Rear view

=== 2025 facelift ===
On 21 August 2025, BYD officially introduced the facelifted Seal 07 DM-i in China, marketed as the BYD Seal 07 DM-i. The facelift brings a slight increase of dimensions, and brings the Seal 07 DM-i more in line with recent BYD Ocean series models, such as redesigned headlights and a grille repositioned to the lower air intake. The integration of a roof-mounted lidar sensor allows for BYD's “God’s Eye-B” (DiPilot 300) intelligent driving assistance system. It carries over the 5th-generation DM-i powertrain from the pre-facelift model.

=== Seal 07 EV (2026) ===
For the 2026 model year, BYD officially introduced the Seal 07 EV in China on 1 March 2026. It went on sale during BYD's Technology Day on March 5, 2026. It shares its body and design with the Seal 07 DM-i, which continues to be sold.

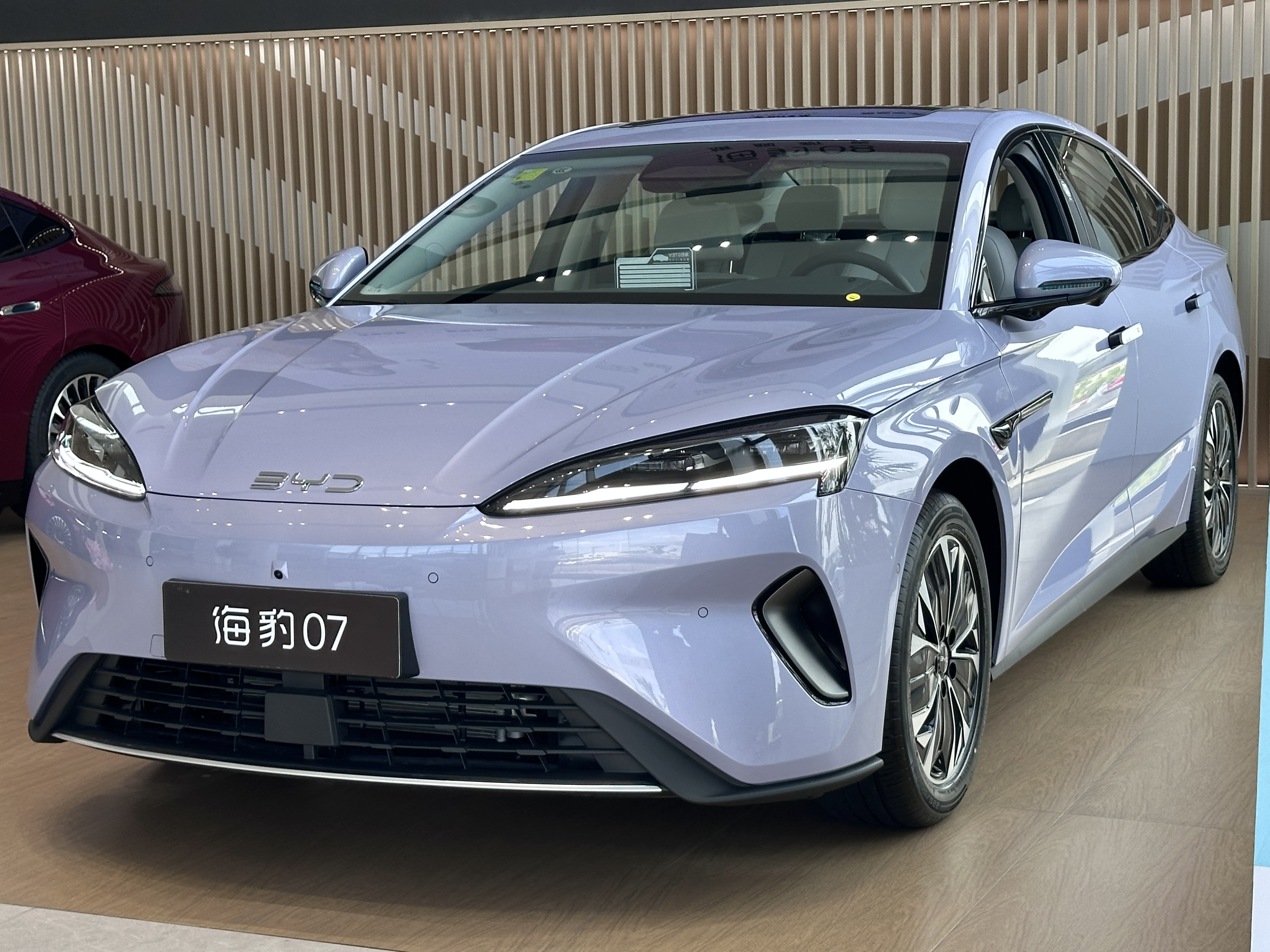
BYD Seal 07 EV

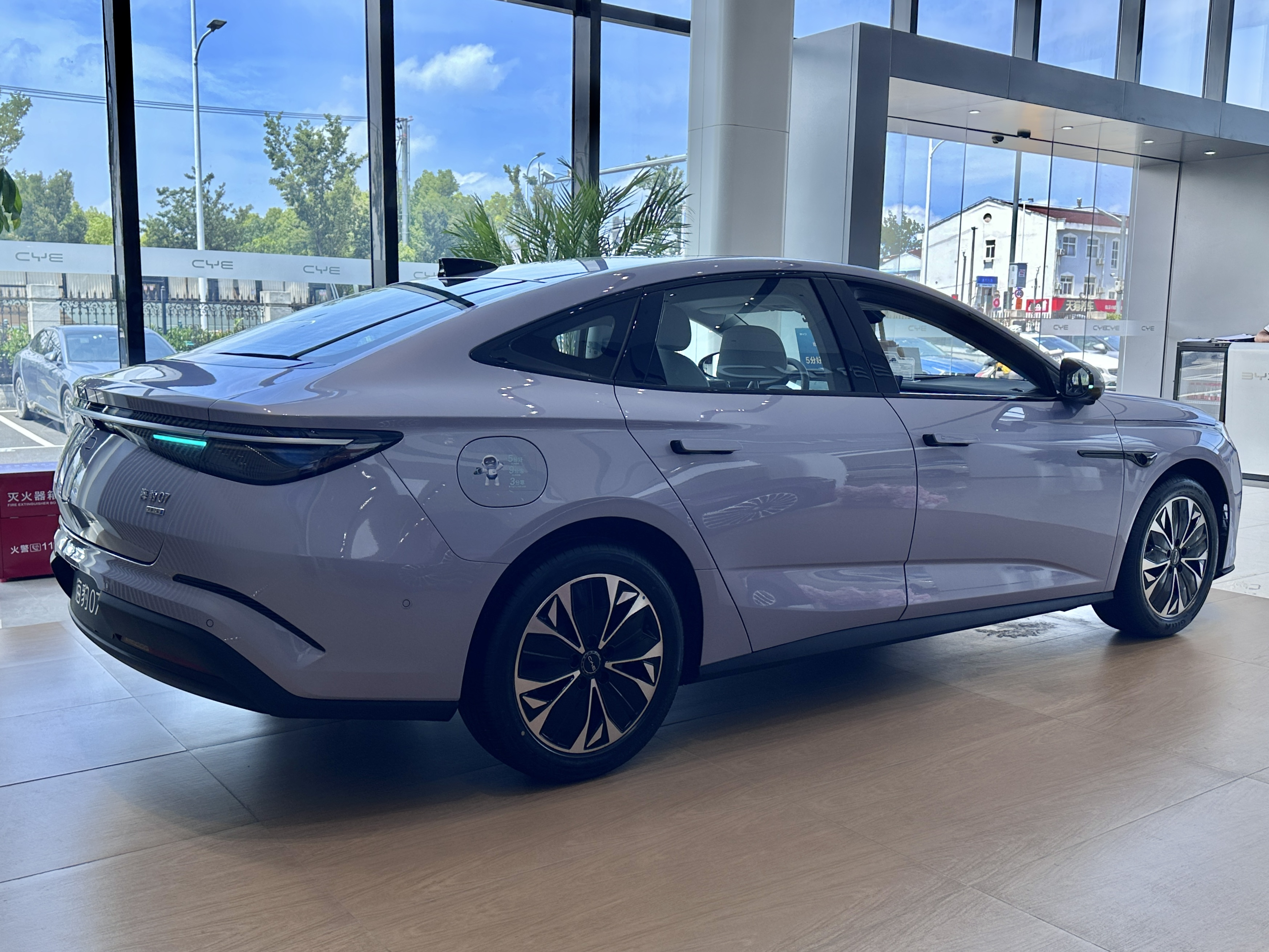
Rear view

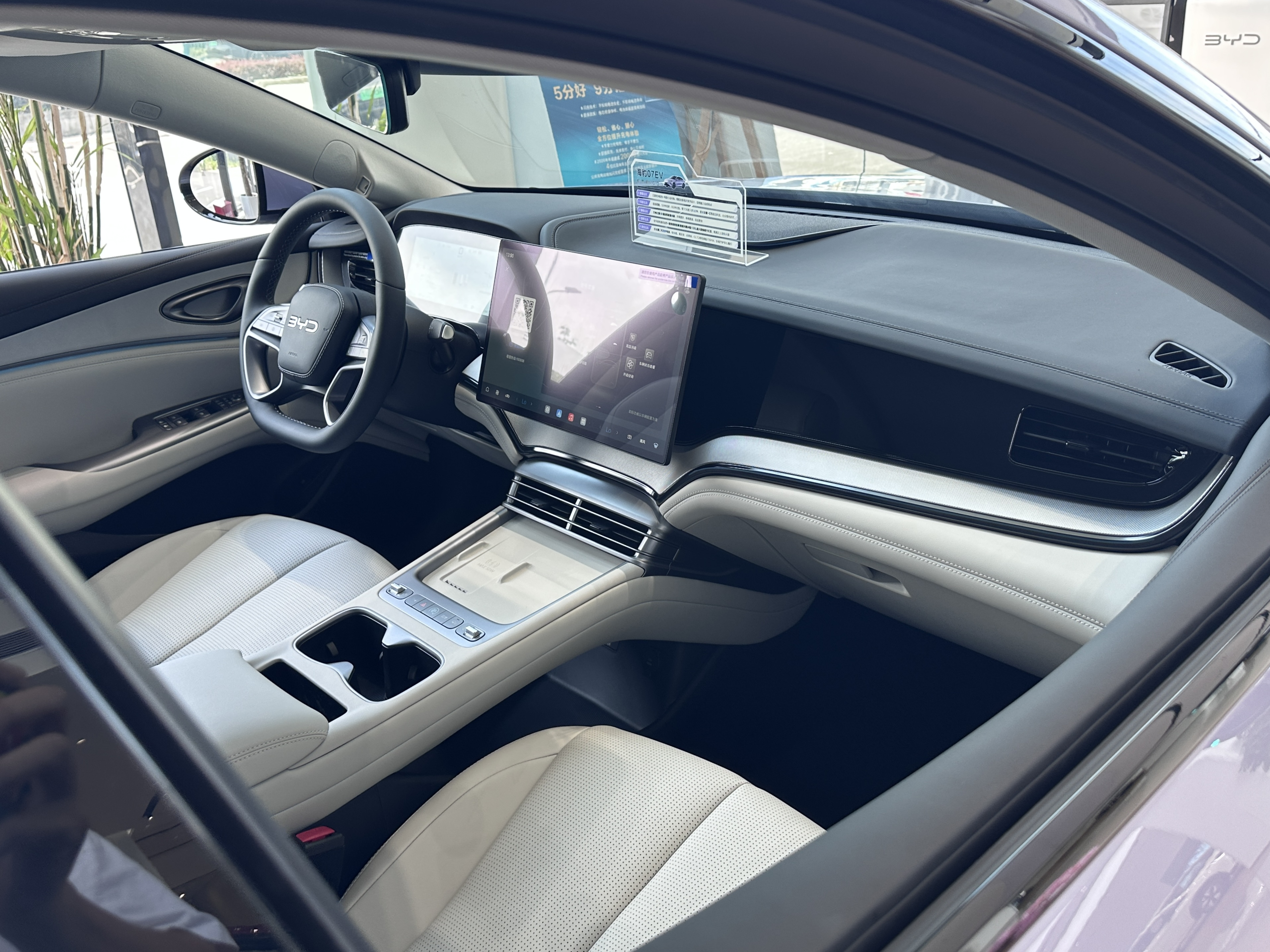
Interior

=== Powertrain ===
Unlike the BYD Han, the BYD Seal 07 DM-i only uses a front wheel drive instead of both available as a DM-p or DM variant and all-wheel drive which allows the fullsize car turning radius fits into narrow space.

The electric version of a BYD Seal 07 EV powertrain details isn't released, which uses an e-Platform 3.0 Evo platform that is expected to available in rear-motor rear-wheel drive or dual-motor all-wheel drive.

The Seal DM-i was launched with a choice of two different petrol engine options. The standard engine was a 1.5-liter naturally aspirated inline-4 with port injection, a compression ratio of 15.5:1 and set in Atkinson cycle, and outputs 81 kW (109 hp) (78 kW (105 hp) net power) at 6,000rpm and 135 N⋅m (100 lb⋅ft) of torque at 4,500rpm. The upgraded engine is a 1.5-liter turbocharged inline-4 with direct injection, a compression ratio of 12.5:1, and set in Miller cycle, which outputs 102 kW (137 hp) (96 kW (129 hp) net power) at 5,200rpm and 231 N⋅m (170 lb⋅ft) of torque from 1,350–4,000rpm.

In August 2024, both engine options were updated as part of the 2025 facelift. The standard engine now outputs 74 kW (99 hp) (70 kW (94 hp) net power) at 6,000rpm and 126 N⋅m (93 lb⋅ft) of torque at 4,500rpm, and has a compression ratio of 16:1 a peak thermal efficiency of 46.1%. The upgraded engine now outputs 115 kW (154 hp) (110 kW (148 hp) net power) at 5,500rpm and 225 N⋅m (166 lb⋅ft) of torque from 2,500–4,500rpm, and has a compression ratio of 14:1 and a peak thermal efficiency of 45.03%.

Type	Engine			Trans.	Battery			Layout	Electric motor			0–100 km/h (62 mph)	Electric range			Calendar years
Type	Displ.	Power	Torque	Trans.	Type	Weight	Peak charge	Layout	Type	Power	Torque	0–100 km/h (62 mph)	NEDC	WLTC	CLTC	Calendar years
1.5 L 121 km DM-i	BYD472QA 1,498 cc (1.5 L) I4	78 kW (105 hp)	135 N⋅m (13.8 kg⋅m; 99.6 lb⋅ft)	E-CVT	17.6 kWh LFP	178 kg (392 lb)	38 kW	FWD	PMSM	145 kW (194 hp)	325 N⋅m (33.1 kg⋅m; 240 lb⋅ft)	8.2 sec	121 km (75 mi)	101 km (63 mi)	—	2023–24
1.5 T 121 km DM-i	BYD476ZQC 1,497 cc (1.5 L) I4 turbo	96 kW (129 hp)	231 N⋅m (23.6 kg⋅m; 170 lb⋅ft)	E-CVT	17.6 kWh LFP	178 kg (392 lb)	38 kW	FWD	PMSM	160 kW (215 hp)	325 N⋅m (33.1 kg⋅m; 240 lb⋅ft)	7.9 sec	121 km (75 mi)	101 km (63 mi)	—	2023–24
1.5 T 200 km DM-i	BYD476ZQC 1,497 cc (1.5 L) I4 turbo	96 kW (129 hp)	231 N⋅m (23.6 kg⋅m; 170 lb⋅ft)	E-CVT	30.7 kWh LFP	270 kg (595 lb)	69 kW	FWD	PMSM	160 kW (215 hp)	325 N⋅m (33.1 kg⋅m; 240 lb⋅ft)	7.9 sec	200 km (124 mi)	160 km (99 mi)	—	2023–24
07 1.5 L 70 km DM-i	BYD472QC 1,498 cc (1.5 L) I4	70 kW (94 hp)	126 N⋅m (93 lb⋅ft)	E-CVT	10.08 kWh LFP	106 kg (234 lb)	—	FWD	PMSM	160 kW (215 hp)	260 N⋅m (192 lb⋅ft)	8.5 sec	67 km (42 mi)	55 km (34 mi)	70 km (43 mi)	2024–25
07 1.5 L 135 km DM-i	BYD472QC 1,498 cc (1.5 L) I4	70 kW (94 hp)	126 N⋅m (93 lb⋅ft)	E-CVT	17.6 kWh LFP	178 kg (392 lb)	40 kW	FWD	PMSM	160 kW (215 hp)	260 N⋅m (192 lb⋅ft)	8.0 sec	—	110 km (68 mi)	135 km (84 mi)	2024–present
07 1.5 T 135 km DM-i	BYD472ZQB 1,498 cc (1.5 L) I4 turbo	110 kW (148 hp)	225 N⋅m (166 lb⋅ft)	E-CVT	17.6 kWh LFP	178 kg (392 lb)	40 kW	FWD	PMSM	200 kW (268 hp)	315 N⋅m (232 lb⋅ft)	6.9 sec	—	110 km (68 mi)	135 km (84 mi)	2024–present
07 1.5 T 230 km DM-i	BYD472ZQB 1,498 cc (1.5 L) I4 turbo	110 kW (148 hp)	225 N⋅m (166 lb⋅ft)	E-CVT	29.46 kWh LFP	266 kg (586 lb)	69 kW	FWD	PMSM	200 kW (268 hp)	315 N⋅m (232 lb⋅ft)	6.9 sec	—	180 km (112 mi)	230 km (143 mi)	2025–present
07 EV	—			1-speed	69.07 kWh LFP	490.6 kg (1,082 lb)		RWD	PMSM	240 kW (322 hp)	305 N⋅m (225 lb⋅ft)	6.5 sec	—	—	705 km (438 mi)	2026–present

== Second generation (2026) ==
Second generation

Overview
- Production: 2026–present
- Model years: 2027
- Designer: Under the lead of Wolfgang Egger

Body and chassis
- Layout: Front-engine, front-motor, front-wheel-drive; Rear-motor, rear-wheel drive

Powertrain
- Engine: Petrol plug-in hybrid: 1.5 L BYD472QB turbo I4
- Electric motor: Permanent magnet synchronous
- Power output: 234 kW (314 hp) (DM-i); 245 kW (329 hp) (EV; RWD)
- Hybrid drivetrain: Plug-in hybrid (DM-i)
- Battery: 38.029 kWh Blade LFP; 76.744 kWh Blade 2.0 LFP
- Electric range: 245 km (152 mi) (PHEV, WLTP); 330 km (205 mi) (PHEV, CLTC); 775 km (482 mi) (BEV, CLTC)

Dimensions
- Wheelbase: 2,960 mm (116.5 in)
- Length: 5,080 mm (200.0 in)
- Width: 1,960 mm (77.2 in)
- Height: 1,495 mm (58.9 in)
- Curb weight: 1,960–2,060 kg (4,321–4,542 lb)

The second generation Seal 07 was revealed through China's MIIT filings on 7 Aug 2026. Similar to its predecessor, both DM-i (plug-in hybrid) and EV (battery electric) variants share the same body and dimensions, only differing in badging The Seal 07 went on sale on 5 November 2026.

The exterior design of the Seal 07 takes cues from the BYD Ocean series' latest Ocean Aesthetics 2.0 design language seen in the larger Seal 08 and Sealion 08, including split headlights in the front with a distinctive dual light signature, and wave-shaped taillights.

The Seal 07 uses a double-wishbone front and five-link independent rear suspension geometry, and is equipped with the DiSus-C adaptive damper system as standard, with the DiSus-M magnetorheological damper system optional. Electric variants have a turning radius of 5.5 metres (18.0 ft) and DM-i variants are capable of 5.6 m (18.4 ft).

The interior is completely redesigned based on the "Ocean Rhythm" cockpit design. The dashboard features a three-spoke flat-bottom steering wheel used across flagship Ocean series models, a column-mounted gear shifter, a 10.25-inch digital instrument cluster supplemented by an optional 26-inch heads-up display, and 15.6-inch floating central infotainment display. The center console features a row of physical controls, a 50-watt wireless charging pad, a tissue dispenser slot, two cupholders, and a storage compartment with a refrigerator with a temperature range of −6–6 °C (21–43 °F). It comes standard with a 16-speaker sound system, while a 20-speaker Devialet sound system is optional. The front-row seats are heated and ventilated as standard, while pneumatic massaging function for the front row, driver's 'zero-gravity' recline, and rear seat heating and ventilation are optional.

DM-i variants have 595 litres (21.0 cu ft) of rear cargo space, while electric variants have 618 litres (21.8 cu ft) and are supplemented with a 160-litre (5.7 cu ft) frunk.

The Seal 07 is available with the God's Eye-C ADAS system with DiPilot 100, with a sensor suite consisting of three mmWave radars, 11 cameras, and 12 ultrasonic sensors and is powered by an Nvidia Orin-N chip providing 84 TOPS, and is capable of Level 2 supervised autonomous driving in highway conditions only. It can be upgraded to the God's Eye-B system with DiPilot 300, which adds a roof-mounted LiDAR and uses an Nvidia Orin-X chip capable of 254 TOPS, and is also capable of Level 2 supervised autonomous driving in urban conditions. Models without the ADAS system come with standard cruise control and a 360-degree surround view camera system as standard.

=== Powertrain ===
The second generation Seal 07 is available with either battery electric or plug-in hybrid powertrains.

The battery-electric variants are equipped with a rear motor producing 328 hp (245 kW; 333 PS) and 365 N⋅m (269 lb⋅ft) of torque. It is equipped with a 76.74 kWh Blade 2.0 LFP battery pack which provides 775 kilometres (482 mi) of range and is capable or recharging 10–70% in 5 minutes and 10–97% in 9 minutes.

The plug-in hybrid (DM-i) variant uses a 1.5-liter turbocharged engine producing a peak power of 115 kW (154 hp) (110 kW (148 hp) net power) at 5,500 rpm and 225 N⋅m (166 lb⋅ft) of torque at 2,500–4,500 rpm and an electric motor producing 214 hp (160 kW; 217 PS) and 260 N⋅m (192 lb⋅ft) of torque. It is equipped with a 38.03 kWh lithium iron phosphate (LFP) battery. It has an electric-only WLTP range of 245 km (152 mi) and CLTC range of 330 km (205 mi).

Specifications
Model	Battery		Engine	Motor			Electric range		0–100 km/h (62 mph)	Top speed	Kerb weight
Model	Type	Weight	Engine	Type	Power	Torque	WLTP	CLTC	0–100 km/h (62 mph)	Top speed	Kerb weight
DM-i	38.029 kWh Blade LFP	280 kg (617 lb)	1.5 L turbo I4; 147 hp (110 kW; 149 PS)	Front: 160 kW (70 kW rated) TZ210XYC PMSM	214 hp (160 kW; 217 PS)	260 N⋅m (192 lb⋅ft)	245 km (152 mi)	330 km (205 mi)	7.7 s	190 km/h (118 mph)	1,960 kg (4,321 lb)
EV	76.744 kWh Blade 2.0 LFP	539 kg (1,188 lb)	—	Rear: 245 kW (115 kW rated) TZ205QYD PMSM	328 hp (245 kW; 333 PS)	365 N⋅m (269 lb⋅ft)	—	775 km (482 mi)	5.5 s	240 km/h (149 mph)	1,975 kg (4,354 lb)

== Sales ==
Year	China
Year	DM-i
2023	32,380
2024	65,000
2025	26,451

== See also ==
- List of BYD Auto vehicles
