= BYD Seal 06 GT =

Battery electric mid-size hatchback

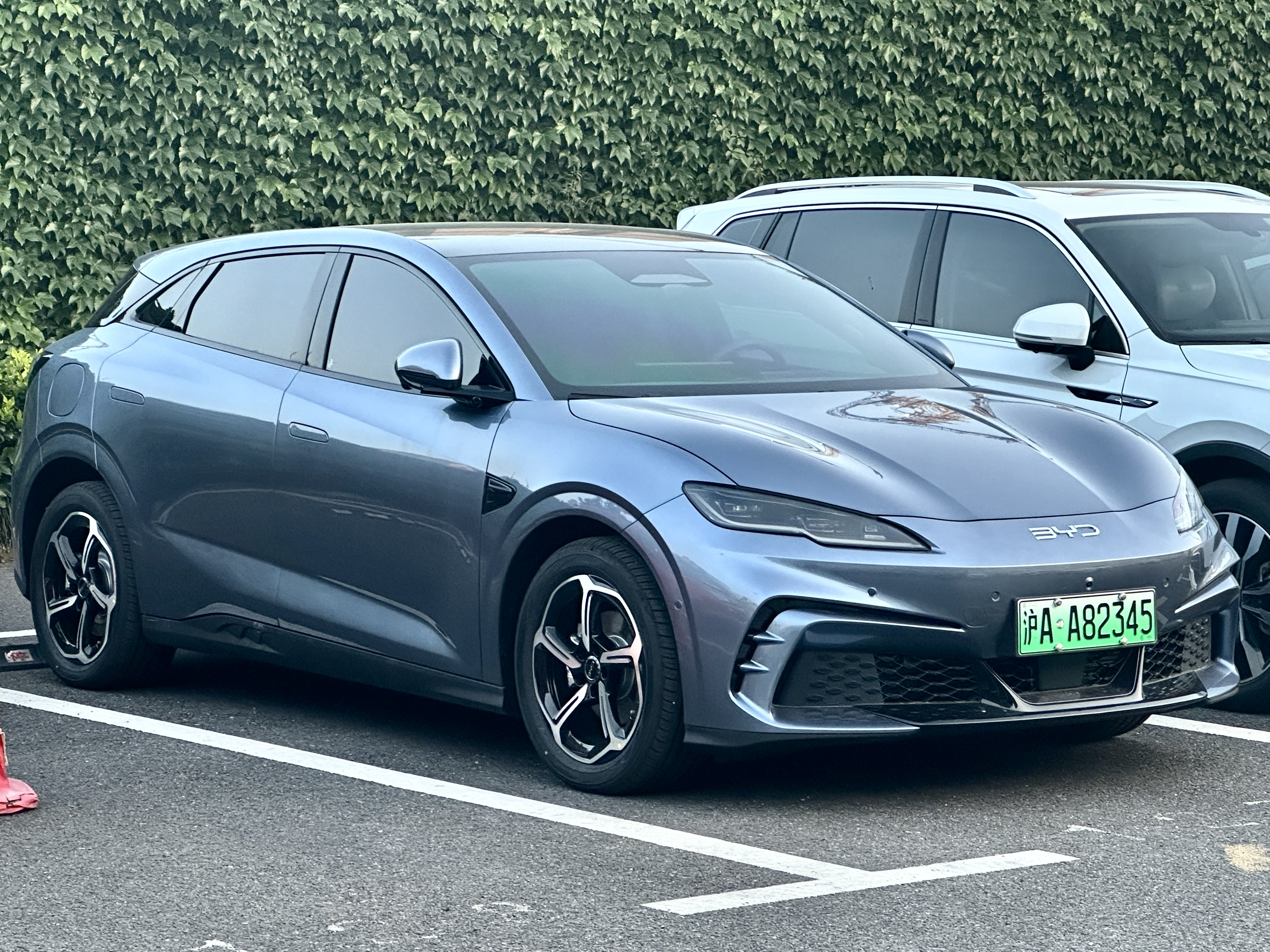

Overview
- Manufacturer: BYD Auto
- Model code: EHE
- Production: October 2024 – present
- Assembly: China: Zhengzhou, Henan; Hefei, Anhui; Changsha, Hunan; Jinan, Shandong
- Designer: Under the lead of Wolfgang Egger

Body and chassis
- Class: Mid-size car (D-segment)
- Body style: 5-door hatchback
- Layout: Rear-motor, rear-wheel-drive; Dual-motor, all-wheel-drive
- Platform: e-Platform 3.0 Evo
- Related: BYD Seal; BYD Song L EV; BYD Sealion 07 EV; Denza N7

Powertrain
- Electric motor: AC permanent magnet synchronous (rear); Squirrel cage induction asynchronous motor (front, AWD)
- Power output: 150–310 kW (204–421 PS; 201–416 hp)
- Battery: 59.52 kWh BYD Blade LFP; 72.96 kWh BYD Blade LFP
- Electric range: 505–605 km (314–376 mi) (CLTC)

Dimensions
- Wheelbase: 2,820 mm (111.0 in)
- Length: 4,630 mm (182.3 in)
- Width: 1,880 mm (74.0 in)
- Height: 1,490 mm (58.7 in)
- Curb weight: 1,850–2,060 kg (4,079–4,542 lb)

The BYD Seal 06 GT (Chinese: 比亚迪海豹06GT; pinyin: Bǐyǎdí Hǎibào 06 GT) is a battery electric mid-size hatchback produced by BYD Auto. Part of the Seal family under the Ocean Series product line-up, the Seal 06 GT is positioned below the Seal battery electric sedan.

== History ==
The model was first showcased as a concept car called the BYD Ocean-M at the Beijing Auto Show in April 2024. The production model was launched in August 2024 at the Chengdu Motor Show as the Seal 06 GT, and was launched in China on 18 October 2024.

== Design and equipment ==
The exterior of the Seal 06 GT adopts a low mounted closed grille design on the front fascia, the lower section of the front fascia is matched with a honeycomb-shaped grille, the rear taillight bar adopts a wave shape design echoes BYD's Ocean vehicle series, illuminated BYD logo on the rear and four exterior colour choices.

Inside, the Seal 06 GT features BYD’s DiLink 100 smart cockpit, with a 10.25-inch full LCD instrument panel, a 12-inch wide heads-up display (W-HUD), and a 12.8-inch (for entry-level variants) or 15.6-inch rotatable central touchscreen infotainment system.

For safety, the Seal 06 GT is equipped with the BYD’s DiPilot 5 intelligent driving assistance system which uses up to 12 ultrasonic radars, five millimetre-wave radars, four panoramic cameras, one smart driving camera and 16 driving assistance capabilities.

The Seal 06 GT is based on the e-Platform 3.0 Evo, an evolution of the previous e-Platform 3.0, with an option of rear-wheel drive and dual-motor, all-wheel drive drivetrains. There are four standard driving modes and the AWD model comes with BYD’s iTAC (intelligent torque adaptation control) system.

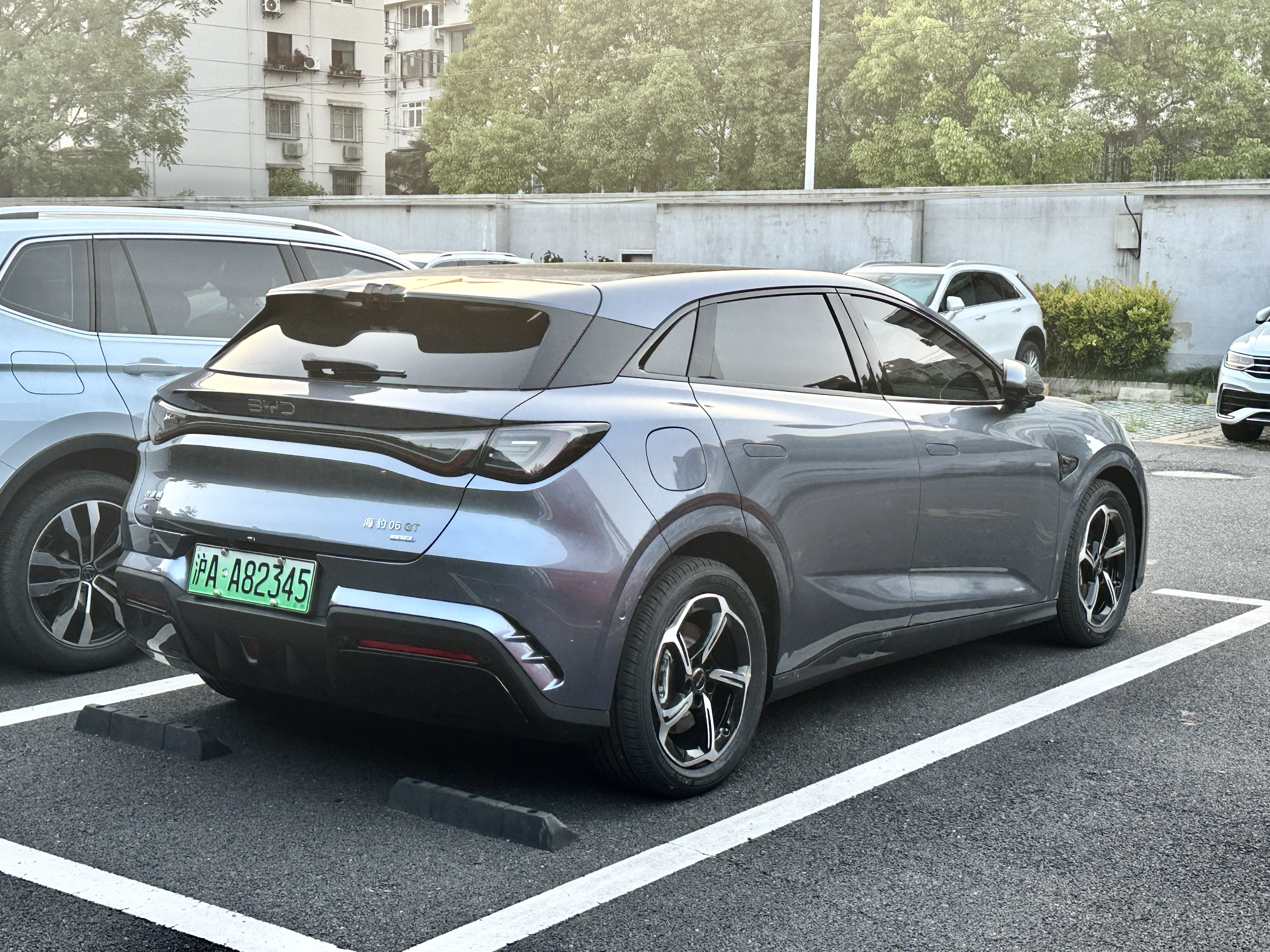
Rear view

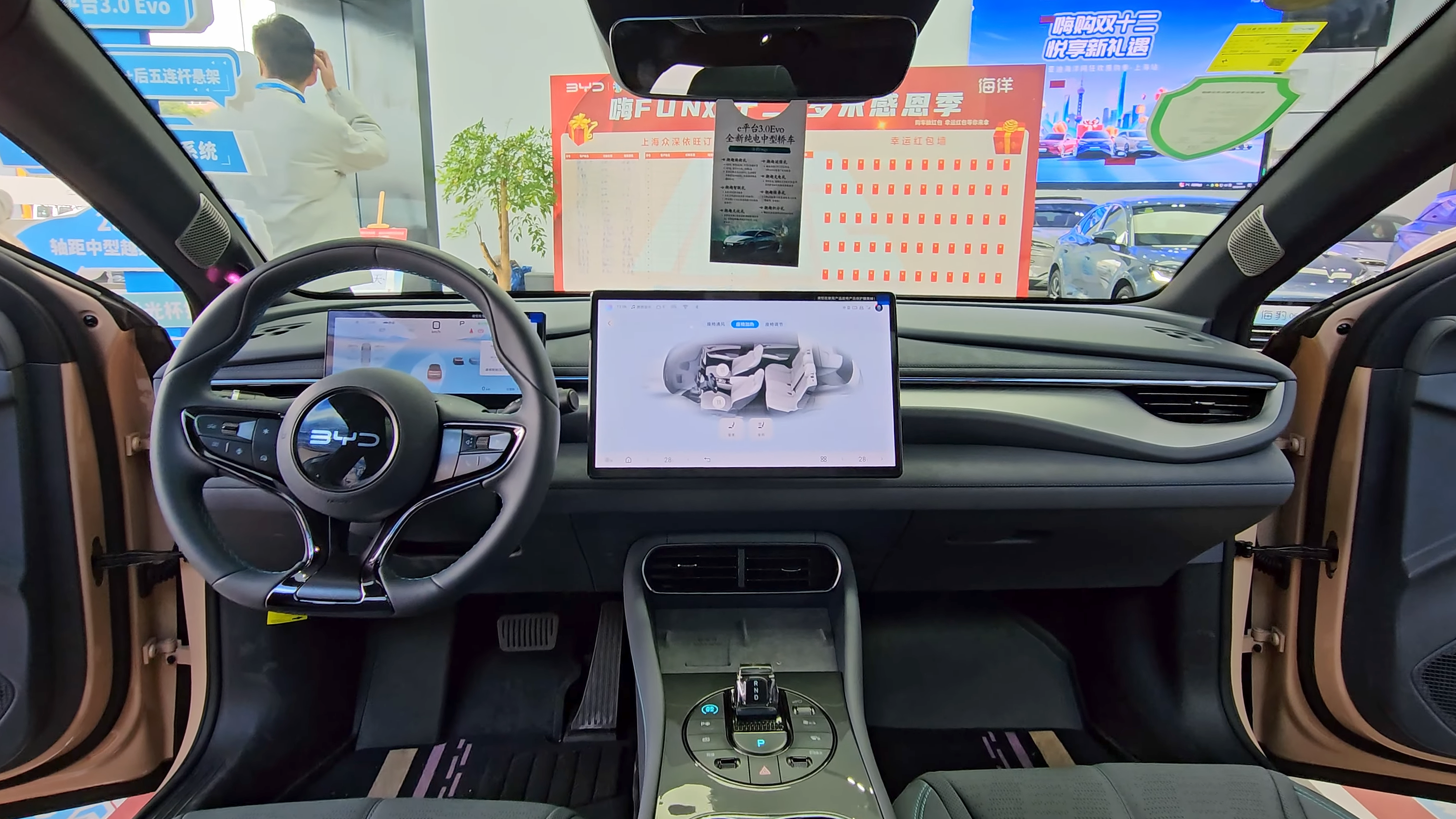
Interior

== See also ==
- List of BYD Auto vehicles
