= BYD Seal =

Battery electric mid-size fastback sedan

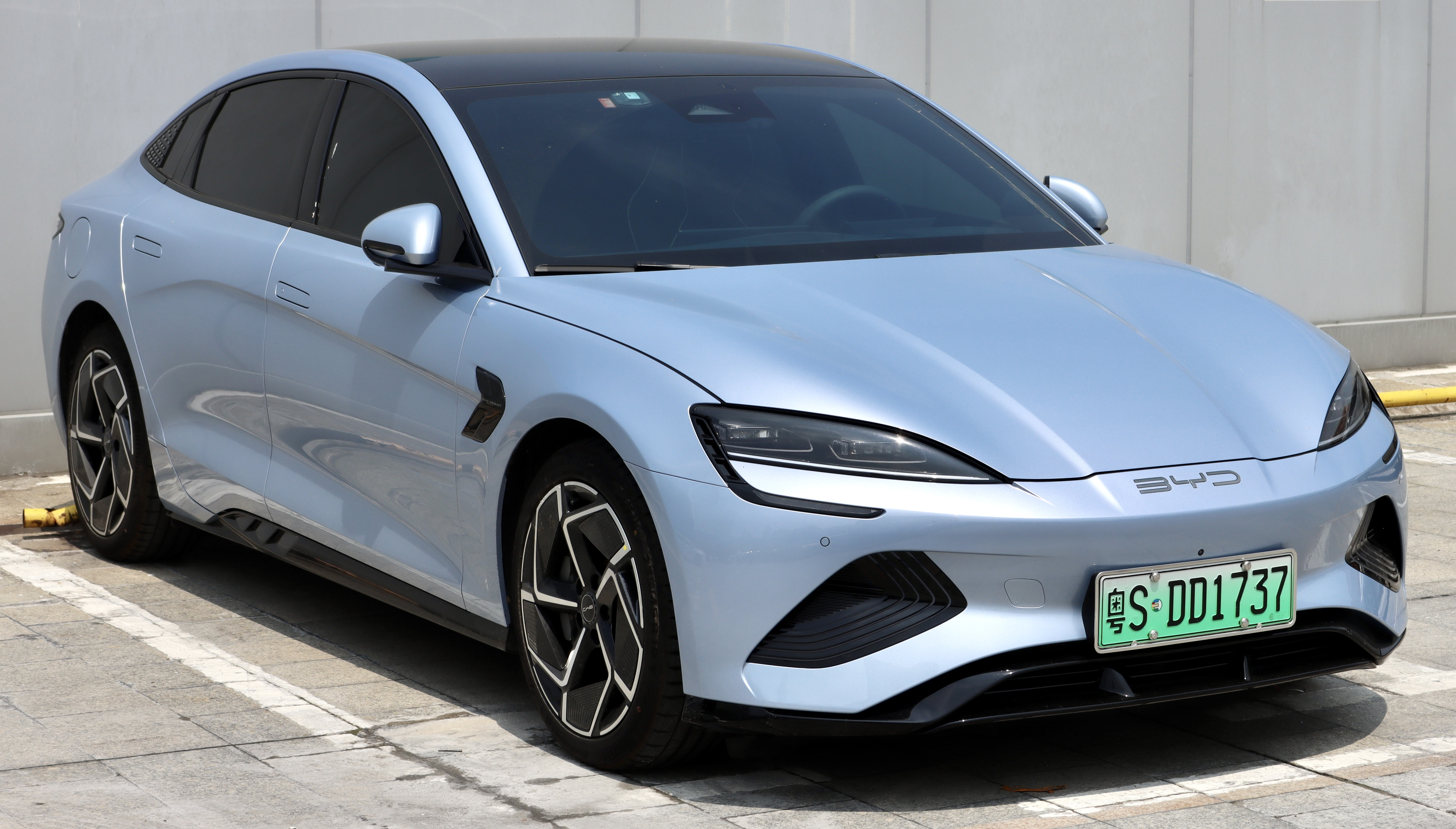

Overview
- Manufacturer: BYD Auto
- Model code: EK
- Production: August 2022 – 2026 (China); 2023–present (export)
- Model years: 2022–2025 (China)
- Assembly: China: Changzhou, Jiangsu; Xi'an, Shaanxi
- Designer: Under the lead of Wolfgang Egger

Body and chassis
- Class: Mid-size car (D-segment)
- Body style: 4-door sedan
- Layout: Rear-motor, rear-wheel-drive; Dual-motor, all-wheel-drive
- Platform: e-Platform 3.0; e-Platform 3.0 Evo (China, 2024–present)
- Related: BYD Seal 06 GT; BYD Song L EV; BYD Sealion 7; Denza N7

Powertrain
- Electric motor: AC permanent magnet synchronous (rear); Squirrel cage induction asynchronous motor (front, AWD)
- Power output: 150–390 kW (204–530 PS; 201–523 hp)
- Battery: 61.4 kWh BYD Blade LFP; 82.5 kWh BYD Blade LFP
- Electric range: 460–570 km (286–354 mi) (WLTP)
- Plug-in charging: 7 kW single-phase (AC); 11 kW three-phase (AC) (Europe); 110–150 kW (DC)

Dimensions
- Wheelbase: 2,920 mm (115.0 in)
- Length: 4,800 mm (189.0 in)
- Width: 1,875 mm (73.8 in)
- Height: 1,460 mm (57.5 in)
- Curb weight: 1,885–2,185 kg (4,156–4,817 lb)

Chronology
- Successor: BYD Seal 07 EV (China)

The BYD Seal (Chinese: 比亚迪海豹; pinyin: Bǐyàdí Hǎibào) is a battery electric mid-size sedan produced by BYD Auto. It is the second car of BYD's "Ocean Series" after the smaller BYD Dolphin hatchback, and is built on BYD's e-Platform 3.0 and an 800-volt electrical platform.

BYD also markets other models using the Seal nameplate, such as the Seal 08 electric and plug-in hybrid full-size sedan, Seal 07 electric and plug-in hybrid sedans, Seal 06 DM-i and Seal 05 DM-i plug-in hybrid sedans, Seal 06 EV electric sedan, Seal 06 GT electric hatchback and the Seal U SUV.

== Overview ==
The BYD Seal was announced in China in May 2022, with deliveries in August 2022. Its design was previewed as the BYD Ocean-X Concept in September 2021. As part of the "Ocean Series" line of products, the Seal adopts many ocean-inspired design features. The exterior design features low hood, pop-out door handles, and long taillamp unit. The dashboard air vents of the Seal have a wavy pattern.

The battery of the Seal is structural, giving the unibody chassis higher torsional rigidity (40,500 Nm/deg compared with an industry average of around 25,000) and a lower floor compared to other electric cars. The Seal has a drag coefficient of just 0.219 C_{d}. BYD claims a 50:50 weight distribution between the front and the rear for the Performance AWD variant.

The Seal is available with a rotatable 15.6-inch infotainment screen, 10.25-inch digital instrument panel, 12-speaker Dynaudio audio system, panoramic glass roof, quilted vegan leather upholstery, dual wireless smartphone chargers and heated and ventilated front seats. The Seal also has a 53-litre front trunk (frunk). Some models are equipped with Intelligent Torque Adaption Control (iTAC) system (a torque vectoring system) and adaptive dampers.

Initial plans were to market the Seal as the Atto 4 in export markets, however the car ended up retaining its original name.

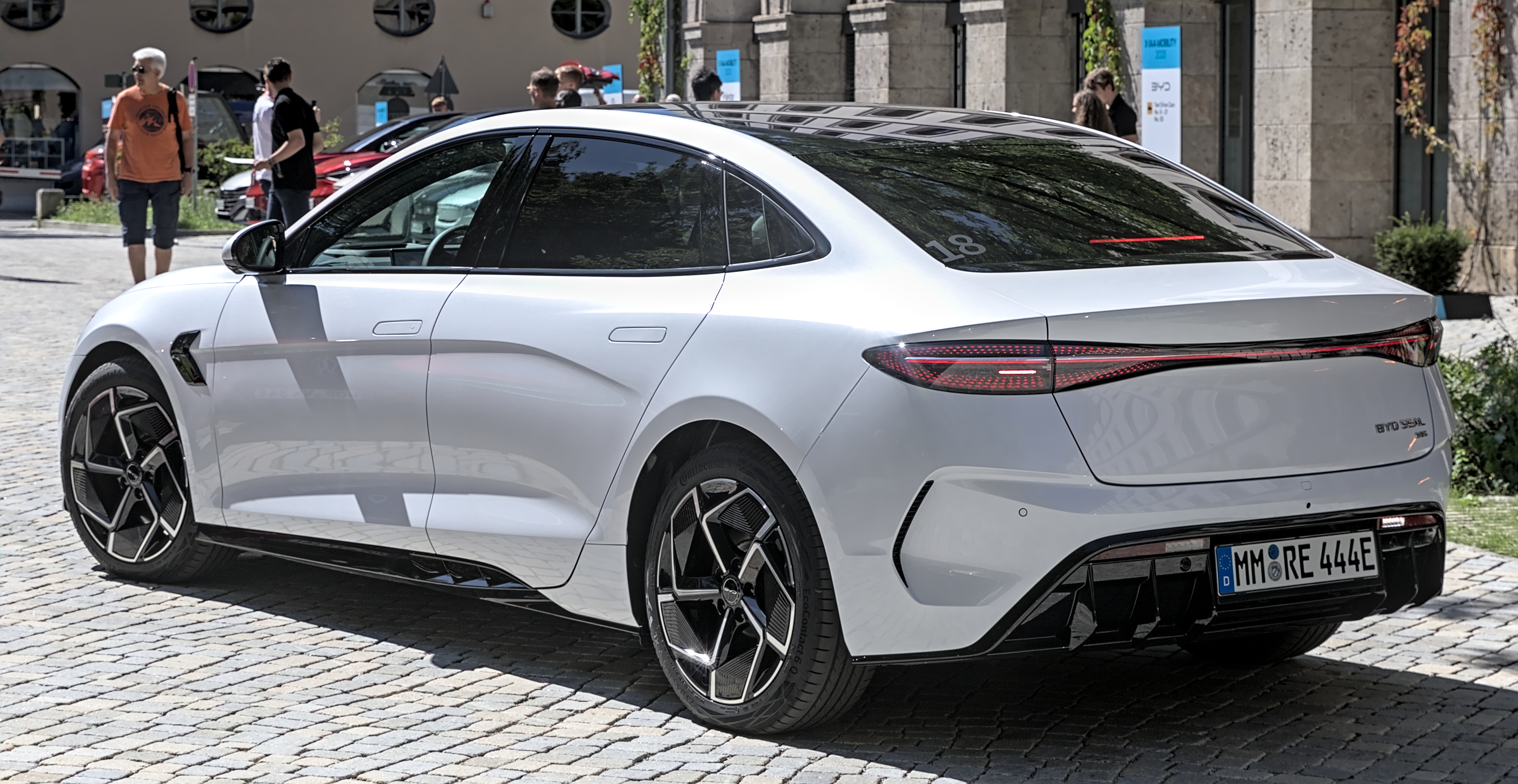
Rear view

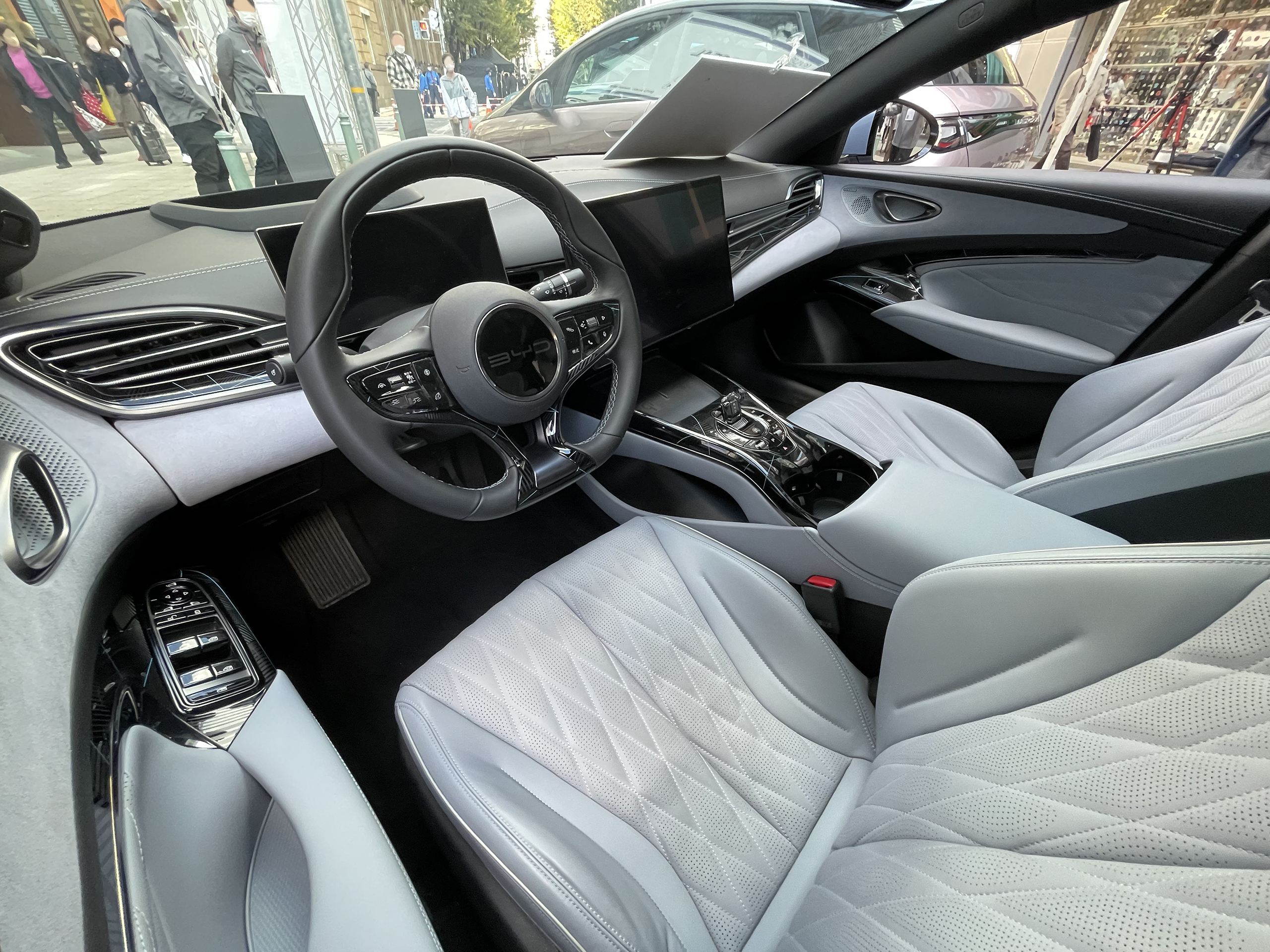
Interior

== Powertrain ==
The Seal is equipped with either a 61.4 kWh or an 82.5 kWh LFP blade battery pack, which can be charged by a 220 V AC power source at 7 kW (11 kW in Europe), or a DC fast charger at 110 or 150 kW (depending on the model). It has a CLTC driving range between 550 and 700 kilometres (340 and 430 mi). The battery pack reportedly can be fast charged from 30 to 80% in 30 minutes, and the car has vehicle-to-load capability.

The Seal's top speed is limited to 180 kilometres per hour (112 mph), and the 0–100 km/h (62 mph) acceleration is claimed to be around 7.5 seconds for the standard models and 3.8 seconds for the AWD Performance model. BYD claims the Seal AWD energy consumption is 12.7 kWh/100 km (0.74 MJ/mi).

Type	Battery	Layout	Electric motor		Power	Torque	0–100 km/h (0–62 mph) (claimed)	Range (claimed)			Calendar years	Note
Type	Battery	Layout	Electric motor		Power	Torque	0–100 km/h (0–62 mph) (claimed)	CLTC	NEDC	WLTP	Calendar years	Note
Standard Range	61.44 kWh LFP Blade battery	RWD	Rear	PMSM	150 kW (201 hp)	310 N⋅m (31.6 kg⋅m; 229 lb⋅ft)	7.5 seconds	550 km (342 mi)	510 km (317 mi)	460 km (286 mi)	2022–present	
700 km Prestige	82.56 kWh LFP Blade battery	RWD	Rear	PMSM	170 kW (228 hp)	330 N⋅m (33.7 kg⋅m; 243 lb⋅ft)	N/A	700 km (435 mi)	N/A	N/A	2023–2026	China only
Extended (Design)	82.56 kWh LFP Blade battery	RWD	Rear	PMSM	230 kW (308 hp)	360 N⋅m (36.7 kg⋅m; 266 lb⋅ft)	5.9 seconds	700 km (435 mi)	650 km (404 mi)	570 km (354 mi)	2022–present	
Performance (Excellence)	82.56 kWh LFP Blade battery	AWD	Front	Squirrel cage induction asynchronous motor	160 kW (215 hp)	310 N⋅m (31.6 kg⋅m; 229 lb⋅ft)	3.8 seconds	650 km (404 mi)	580 km (360 mi)	520 km (323 mi)	2022–present	
Performance (Excellence)	82.56 kWh LFP Blade battery	AWD	Rear	PMSM	230 kW (308 hp)	360 N⋅m (36.7 kg⋅m; 266 lb⋅ft)	3.8 seconds	650 km (404 mi)	580 km (360 mi)	520 km (323 mi)	2022–present	
Performance (Excellence)	82.56 kWh LFP Blade battery	AWD	Combined:		390 kW (523 hp)	670 N⋅m (68.3 kg⋅m; 494 lb⋅ft)	3.8 seconds	650 km (404 mi)	580 km (360 mi)	520 km (323 mi)	2022–present	

== Markets ==
=== China ===
The Seal went on sale in China in July 2022, with deliveries in the following month. There were four models of powertrains offered in China, starting with a standard "Elite" model (精英型) powered by a 150 kW (204 PS; 201 hp) single-motor rear wheel drive (RWD), "Prestige" model (尊贵型) producing 170 kW (231 PS; 228 hp) with single-motor RWD, "Performance" model (性能型) powered by a single 230 kW (313 PS; 308 hp) RWD motor, and the "4WD Performance" model (四驱性能型) with a 390 kW (530 PS; 523 hp) dual-motor (160 kW (218 PS; 215 hp) + 230 kW (313 PS; 308 hp)) all wheel drive system.

In May 2023, BYD introduced the Seal Champion Edition in China. The version introduces lower pricing, with adjusted and upgraded equipment list such as leather seats, rear privacy glass, an adjustable cup holder in the armrest box. It also received an additional "700 km Prestige" trim level with 700 kilometres (430 mi) of range. In March 2024, BYD further dropped the price of the Seal by 5 percent by introducing the Seal Honor Edition.

In August 2024, BYD introduced the refreshed Seal for the Chinese market. Initially it would be renamed to the Seal 07 EV, but BYD abandoned the rebrand after receiving feedback from consumers. The "Seal 07 EV" moved its name to larger battery electric variant BYD Seal 07 DM-i plug-in hybrid fullsize car as the Seal 07 EV. The updated model is equipped with new wheels, a roof-mounted LiDAR produced by RoboSense, and the "Build Your Dreams" badge on the rear was replaced with a BYD logo with a red backlight. The updated BYD Seal exterior remains unchanged from the facelift version, which features an redesigned interior, four-spoke steering wheel, and a new exterior body colors replacing the arctic light blue color.

=== Europe ===
The Seal became available in several European countries in September 2023, occupying the D-segment.

=== Hong Kong ===
The Seal went on sale in Hong Kong in October 2023. Available trim levels match the Thai and Singaporean market Seal, which are Dynamic RWD, Premium RWD and Performance AWD.

=== Latin America ===
==== Brazil ====
The Seal went on sale in Brazil in August 2023. The only variant available is the dual-motor AWD version with an output of 390 kW (530 PS; 523 hp).

==== Mexico ====
The Seal was launched in Mexico on 29 November 2023, as the fifth BYD model to be marketed in Mexico. It is available with either rear-wheel drive (61.44 kWh) and four-wheel drive (82.56 kWh) variants.

=== South Africa ===
The Seal was launched in South Africa on 4 October 2024, with two variants: Lux EXT RWD and Lux Performance AWD. At the time of its introduction, the Seal became the cheapest battery electric sedan on sale in South Africa.

=== Southeast Asia ===
The Seal went on sale in Thailand and Singapore in September 2023. In both countries, the available trim levels are Dynamic RWD, Premium RWD and Performance AWD. The former is equipped with a 61.4 kWh LFP Blade battery which powers a single 150 kW (204 PS; 201 hp) rear motor. The Premium RWD uses a larger 82.5 kWh LFP battery, powering a single 230 kW (313 PS; 308 hp) rear motor. The Performance AWD (badged '3.8s' denoting the 0–100 km/h (62 mph) acceleration time of 3.8 seconds) uses a dual-motor setup with a maximum output of 390 kW (530 PS; 523 hp), with the same 82.5 kWh LFP battery.

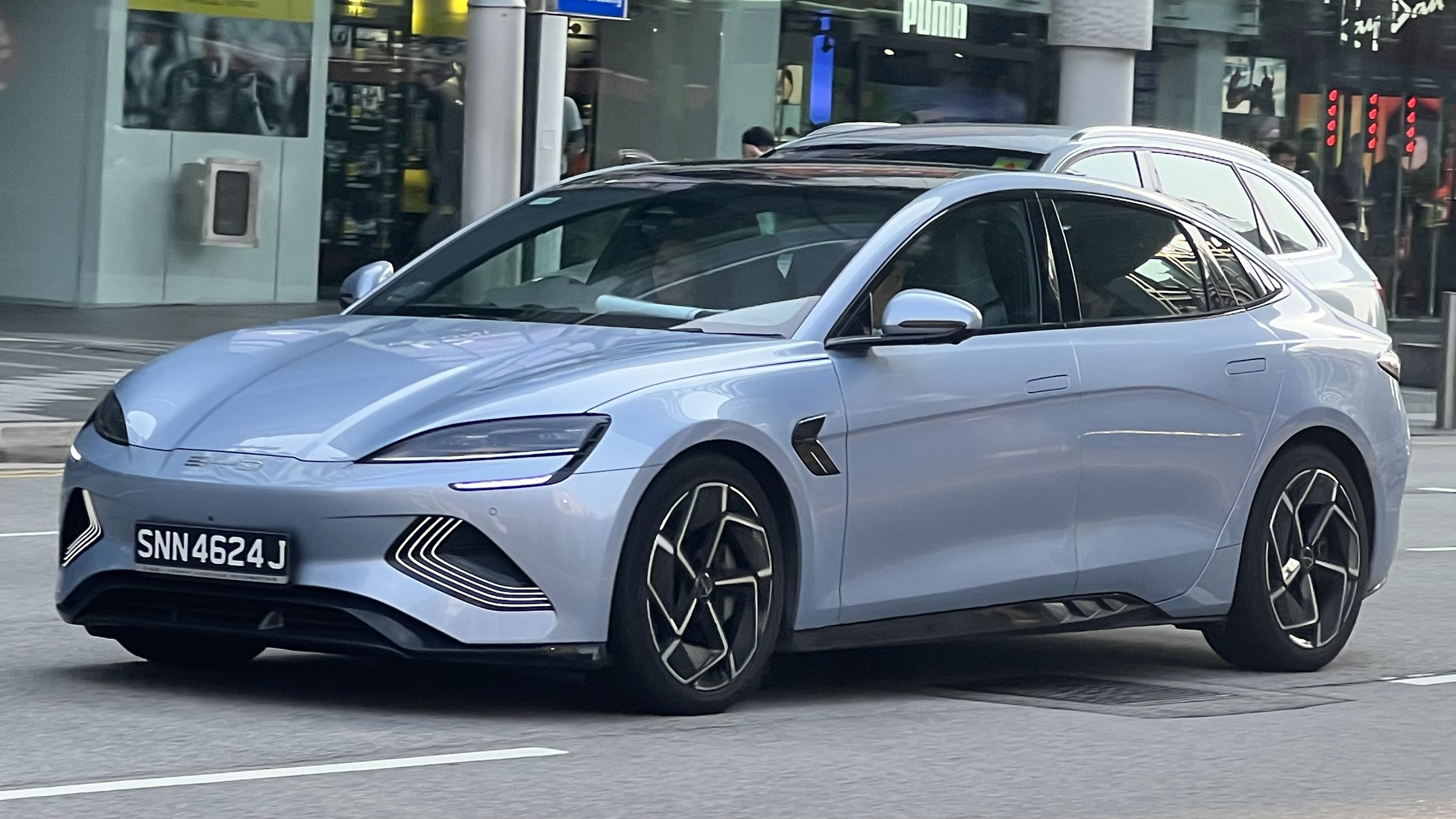
2024 BYD Seal Electric Premium (Singapore)

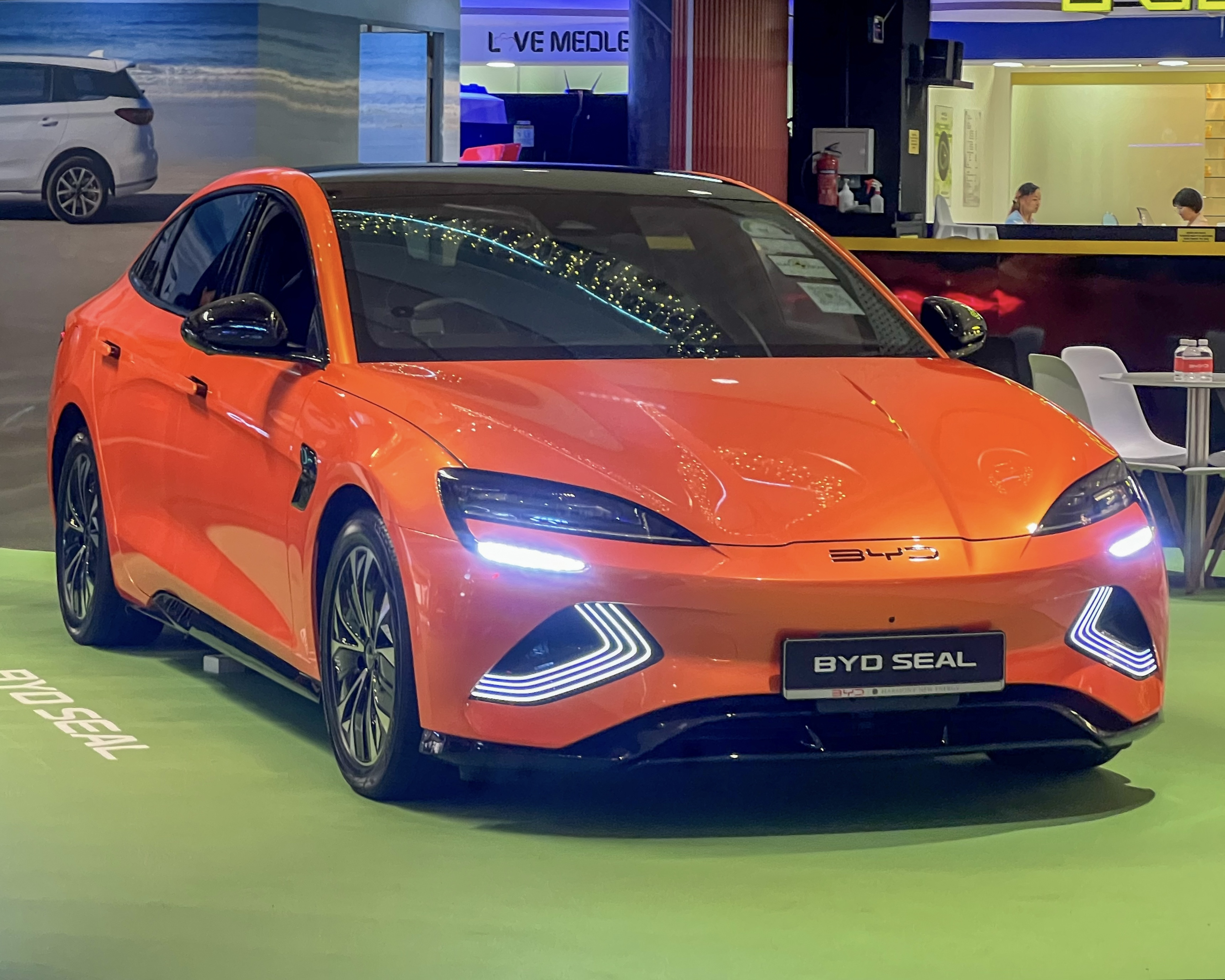
2024 BYD Seal Electric Dyanmic (Singapore)

The Seal was introduced in Indonesia in January 2024 alongside the Atto 3 and Dolphin, as part of BYD's entry to the Indonesian passenger car market. Pricing was announced at the 31st Indonesia International Motor Show in February 2024. At launch, it was available with three variants: Dynamic, Premium and Performance AWD.

The Seal was introduced in Malaysia in February 2024. It is available in two trim levels, which are Premium RWD and Performance AWD. The Dynamic RWD variant was added in September 2024 using the Standard Range powertrain. In August 2025, the Seal line-up in Malaysia was updated and the entry-level Dynamic RWD variant was discontinued.

The Seal has been launched in Brunei on 15 June 2024 and the car was offered only in the Performance AWD trim.

The Seal was introduced in Vietnam on 18 July 2024 alongside the Atto 3 and Dolphin, as part of BYD's entry to Vietnam, and is available in Advance and Performance variants.

The Seal was introduced in the Philippines on 25 October 2024 in a sole Performance AWD variant. The Advanced RWD variant was added in January 2025.

==== Australia ====
The Seal was launched in Australia in 2023 with three variants, Dynamic, Premium and Performance.

The Dynamic variant was dropped in 2026.

== Safety ==
=== ANCAP ===
ANCAP test results BYD Seal (2023, aligned with Euro NCAP)
Test	Points	%
Overall:	5 /5 stars	
Adult occupant:	35.78	89%
Child occupant:	43	87%
Pedestrian:	51.68	82%
Safety assist:	13.56	75%

=== ASEAN NCAP ===
ASEAN NCAP test results BYD Seal RWD (650KM) (2025)
Test	Points
Overall:	5 /5 stars
Adult occupant:	38.44
Child occupant:	16.60
Safety assist:	19.52
Motorcyclist Safety:	17.50

=== Euro NCAP ===
Euro NCAP test results BYD Seal Design RWD (LHD) (2023)
Test	Points	%
Overall:	5 /5 stars	
Adult occupant:	35.8	89%
Child occupant:	43	87%
Pedestrian:	51.7	82%
Safety assist:	13.8	76%

== Awards ==
In December 2024, the BYD Seal became the first Chinese-made car shortlisted in the top 10 for 2024-2025 Japan Car of the Year.

In 2024, the BYD Seal was ranked in the top 3 of the 2024 World Car of the Year Award.

In March 2025, BYD Seal won the Japan EV of the Year 2024 award.

== Sales ==
Year	Sales						Total production
Year	China	Australia	Thailand	Brazil	Indonesia	Malaysia (Note: Figures based on registration (Malaysia))	Total production
2022	51,200						51,200
2023	62,079	471	1,810	1,040			84,277
2024	17,528	6,393	5,156	3,524	4,828	2,958	60,607
2025	6,189	3,784	1,575		1,195	1,056	

== See also ==
- List of BYD Auto vehicles
- Plug-in electric vehicles in India
