= BYD Sealion 7 =

Battery electric mid-size crossover SUV

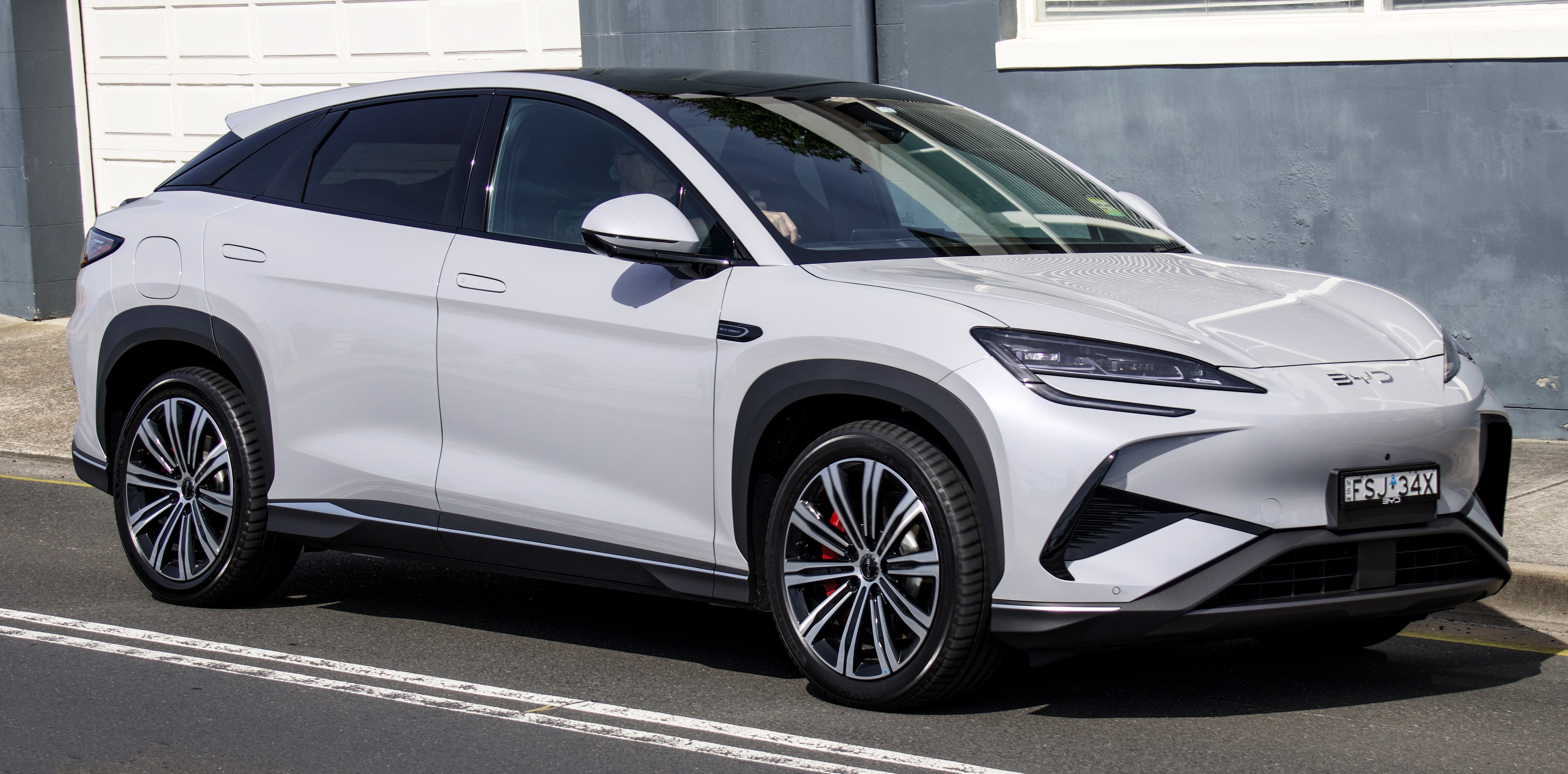
- BYD Sealion 7 Performance

Overview
- Manufacturer: BYD Auto
- Model code: UKE
- Also called: BYD Sealion 07 EV (China)
- Production: May 2024 – present
- Model years: 2024–2025 (China)
- Assembly: China: Xi'an, Shaanxi; Changzhou, Jiangsu
- Designer: Under the lead of Wolfgang Egger

Body and chassis
- Class: Mid-size SUV
- Body style: 5-door crossover SUV
- Layout: Rear-motor, rear-wheel-drive; Dual-motor, all-wheel-drive
- Platform: e-Platform 3.0; e-Platform 3.0 Evo (China and European 91.3 kWh model)
- Related: BYD Song L EV; Denza N7; BYD Seal; BYD Seal 06 GT

Powertrain
- Electric motor: Permanent magnet synchronous
- Power output: 170 kW (228 hp; 231 PS); 230 kW (308 hp; 313 PS); 390 kW (523 hp; 530 PS)
- Battery: 71.8 kWh BYD Blade LFP; 80.64 kWh BYD Blade LFP; 82.56 kWh BYD Blade LFP; 91.3 kWh BYD Blade LFP
- Plug-in charging: 11 kW (AC); 150 kW (DC); 230 kW (DC, 91 kWh AWD); 180–240 kW (DC, China)

Dimensions
- Wheelbase: 2,930 mm (115.4 in)
- Length: 4,830 mm (190.2 in)
- Width: 1,925 mm (75.8 in)
- Height: 1,620 mm (63.8 in)
- Kerb weight: 2,155–2,435 kg (4,751–5,368 lb)

The BYD Sealion 7, also sold in China as the BYD Sealion 07 EV (Chinese: 比亚迪海狮07 EV; pinyin: Bǐyǎdí Hǎishī 07 EV), is a battery electric mid-size SUV manufactured by BYD Auto since 2024. It is the first vehicle of the Sealion (海狮; Hǎishī) family of SUVs under the Ocean Series product line-up.

== History ==
The Sealion 7 was first introduced on 17 November 2023 at the 2023 Guangzhou Auto Show as the Sealion 07 EV. It was launched at the 2024 Beijing Auto Show in April 2024 and went on sale in the following month. It was developed with the Tesla Model Y as its main competitor benchmark.

The model first went on sale outside mainland China in Hong Kong in September 2024 as the BYD Sealion 7, before rolling out to other Asian markets and Europe later that year.

The model was removed from BYD's Chinese domestic market line-up in 2026.

== Design and equipment ==
The exterior of the Sealion 07 EV features the brand's Ocean Aesthetics design language. The front fascia features the Ocean Series’ signature ‘X face’ motif with U-shaped LED headlights and sculpted curves to evoke ocean waves. The side features flushed door handles and a rounded roofline. The rear fascia features a fastback design with subtle ducktail spoiler, and the Ocean Series’ ‘water-drop’ full-width LED taillights.

The interior features a 10.25-inch digital instrument panel, a 15.6-inch rotatable touchscreen infotainment system with Android Auto and Apple CarPlay integration, dual wireless charging pads, a number of physical buttons on the centre console, high quality materials used for the dashboard, door panels and seats, and optional 12-speaker Dynaudio audio system. The boot space stands at 520 L (18 cu ft) and expands to 1,789 L (63.2 cu ft) when the rear seats are folded down. The model is also equipped with a 58 L (2.0 cu ft) frunk storage.

The Chinese market Sealion 07 EV is based on the e-Platform 3.0 Evo, an evolution of the previous e-Platform 3.0. The notable changes include a 12-in-1 electric drive system, which improves integration over the 8-in-1 of the e-Platform 3.0. It also supports electric motors that spin up to 23,000 rpm, higher than any other motors ever produced by BYD. Like the BYD Seal, the Sealion 07 EV utilizes BYD's cell-to-body (CTB) technology.

The Sealion 07 EV features BYD's new DiSus-C intelligent damping body control system, an adaptive suspension that senses the road condition and reactively adjust the rigidity of the wheel dampers. It is the first BYD vehicle to be equipped with the DiPilot 100 (nicknamed "God's Eye") advanced driver-assistance system (only equipped for the Chinese market), which is reportedly integrated with 12 ultrasonic sensors, 5 mm-wave radars and 11 omniview cameras. It also features Nappa leather upholstery, 50W wireless charger and a 50-inch AR-HUD, with electrochromic sunroof being an optional feature.

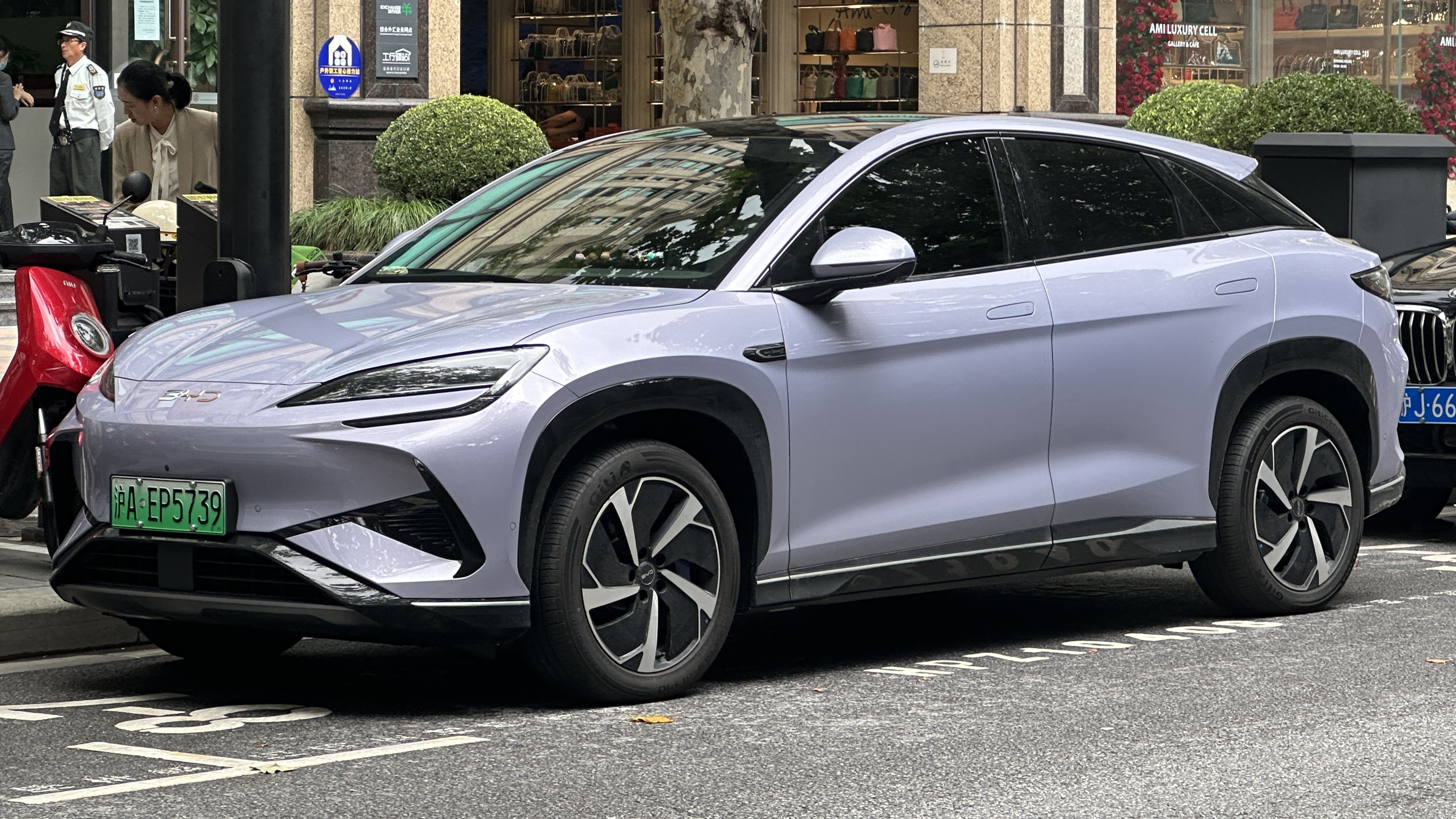
BYD Sealion 07 EV (China)

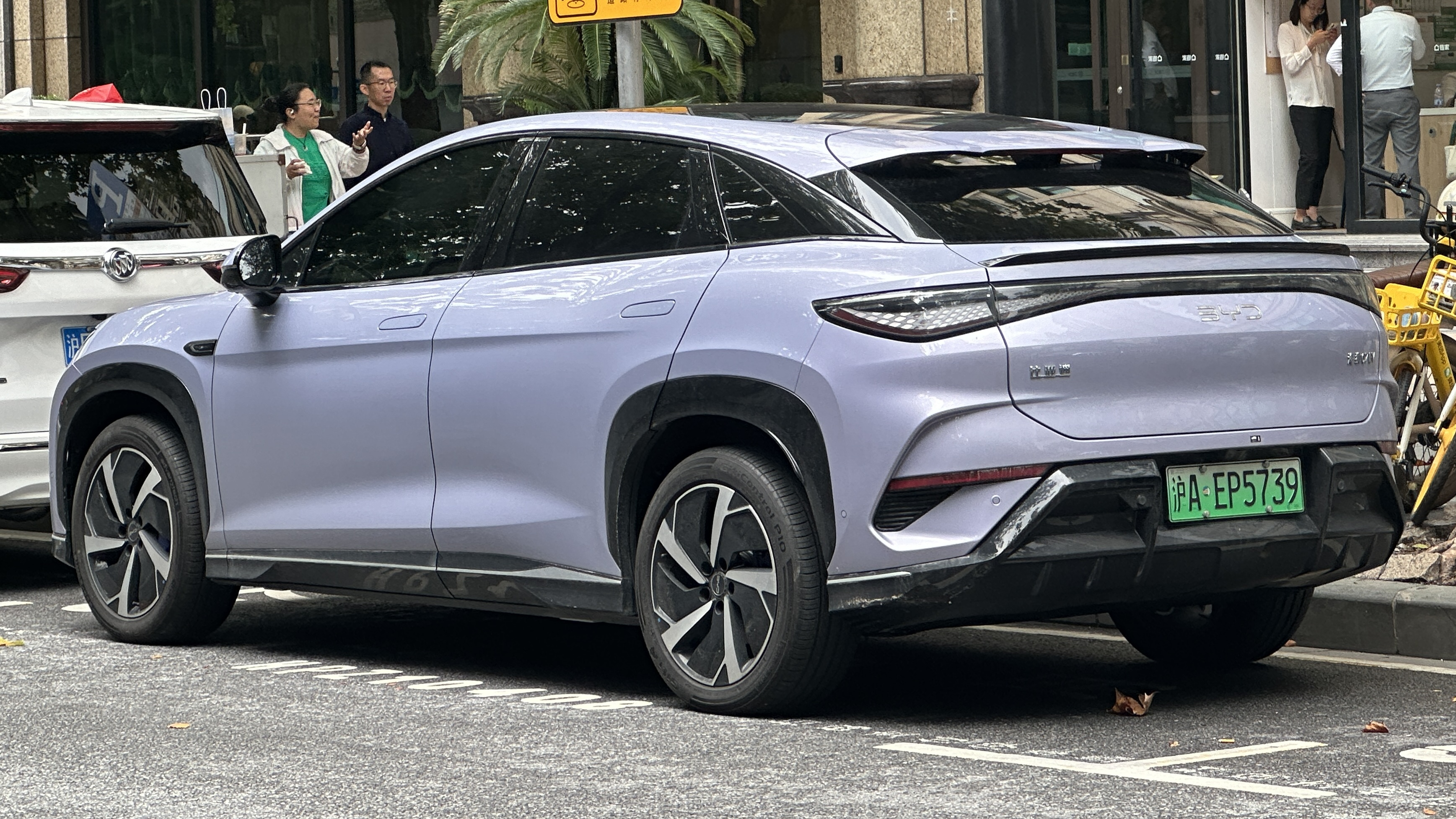
Rear view

== Export markets ==
Outside China, BYD marketed the model as the Sealion 7. In September 2024, the model was introduced in Hong Kong, Mauritius, and Nepal. The European launch of the model was held in October 2024.

The export-market Sealion 7 uses the older e-Platform 3.0 with a 400V electrical architecture, except for the top-spec European version with a 91.3 kWh battery, which is based on the more advanced e-Platform 3.0 Evo featuring an 800V electrical architecture similar to the Chinese-market Sealion 07 EV. The DC fast charging speed is limited to 150 kW for the standard export model, while the top-spec European version supports up to 230 kW, and the Chinese-market model supports up to 240 kW.

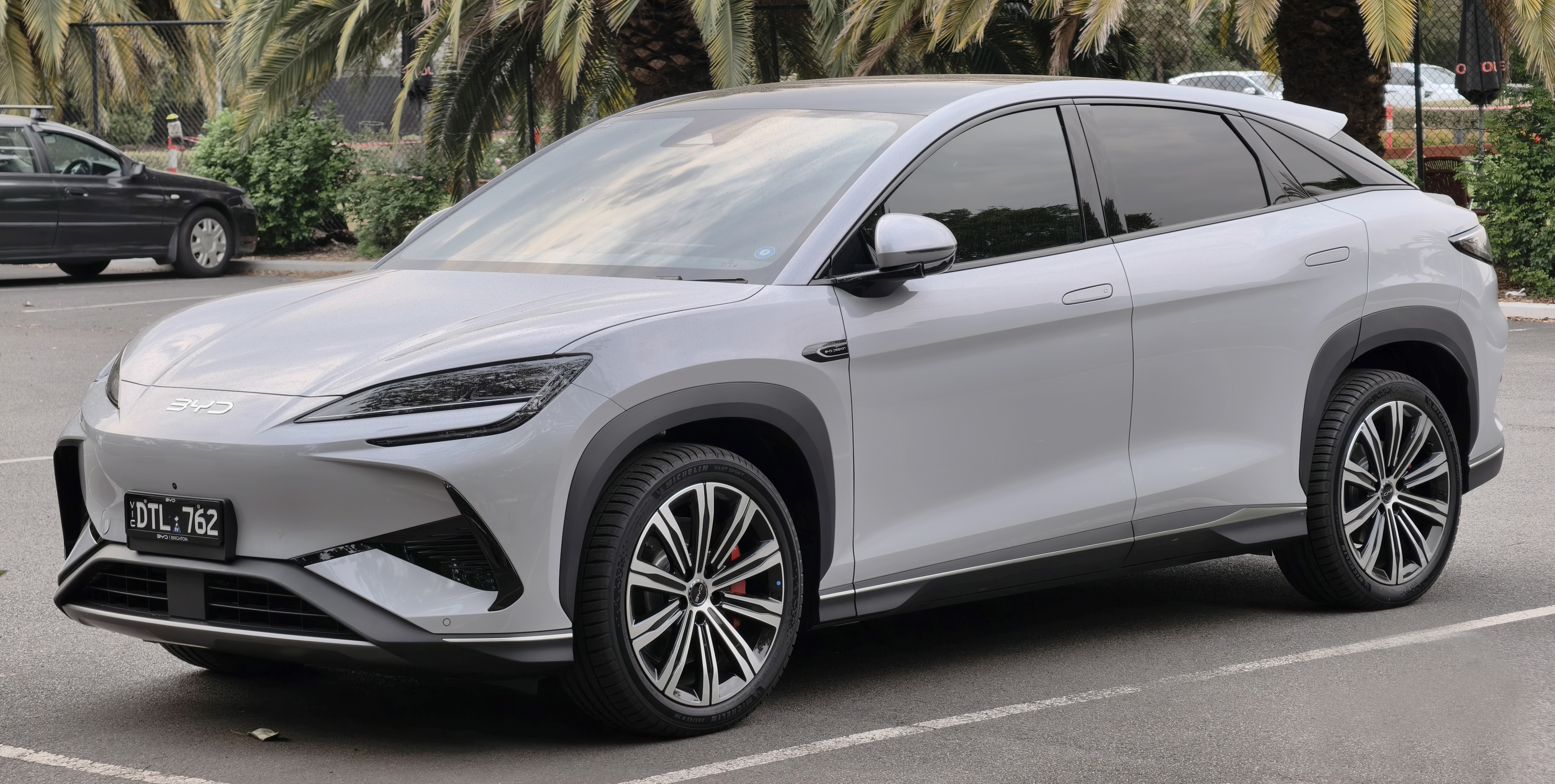
Front three-quarter view

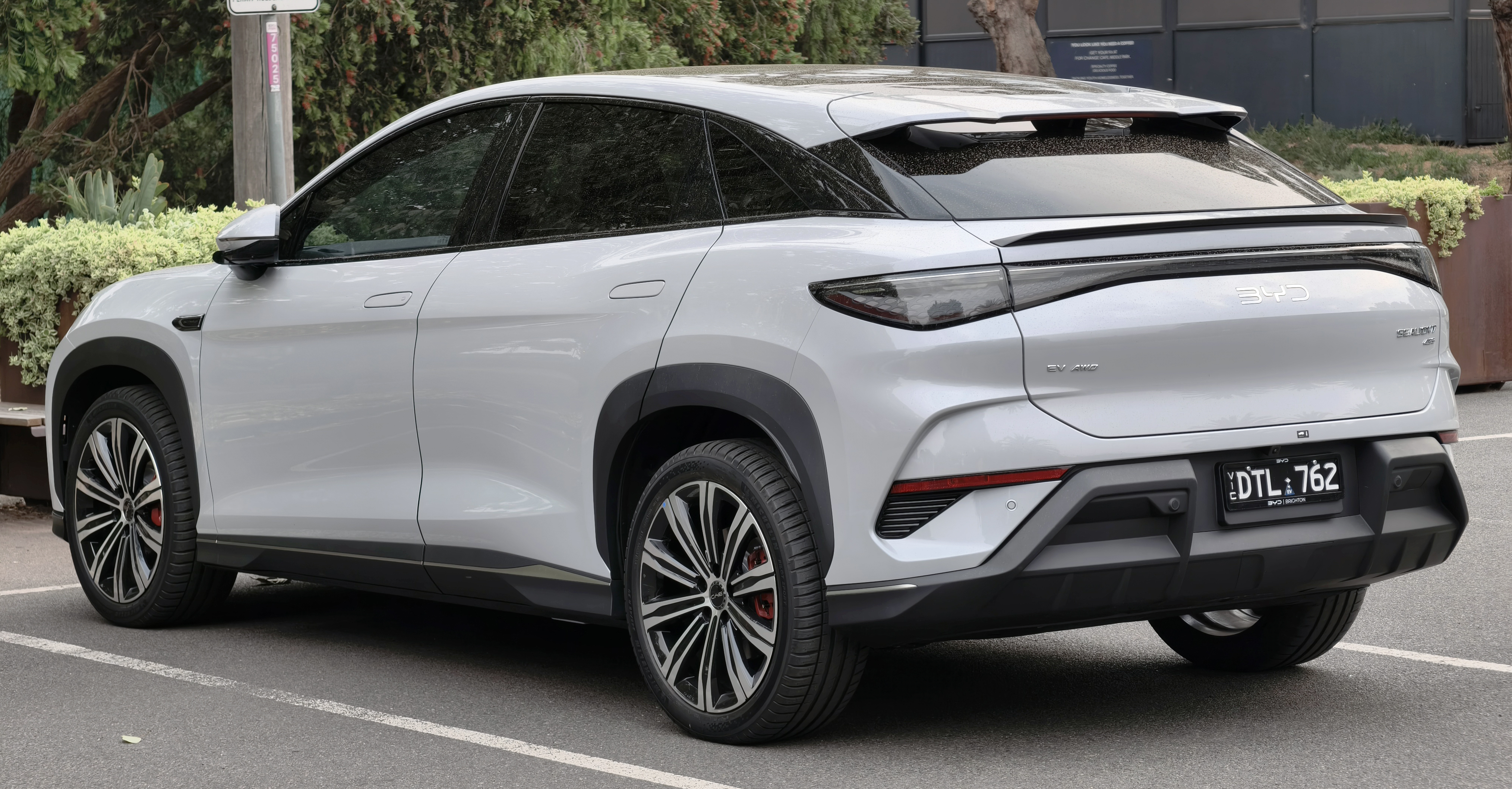
Rear three-quarter view

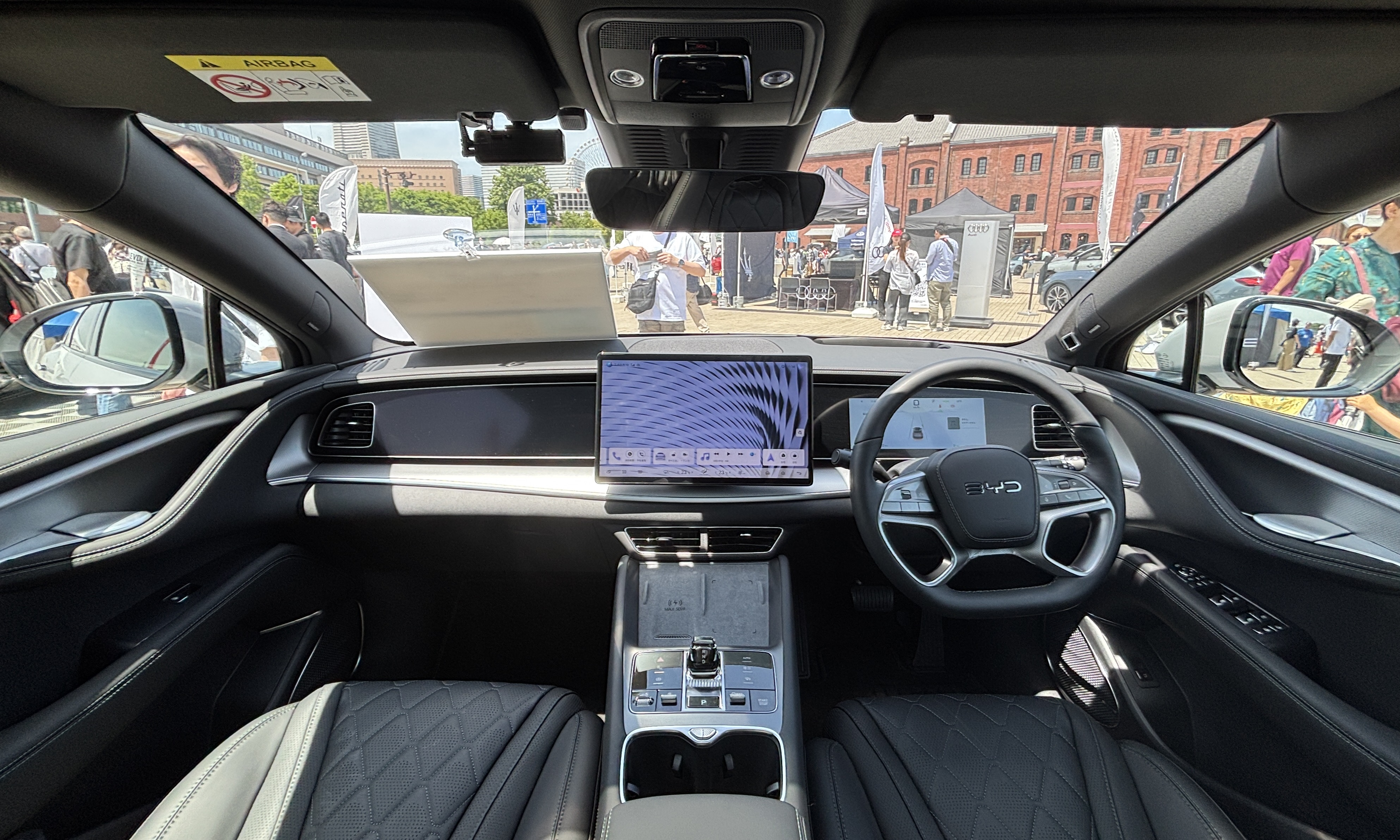
Interior

=== Asia ===
==== Brunei ====
The Sealion 7 was launched in Brunei on 21 May 2025 in the sole variant: Performance AWD.

==== Hong Kong ====
The Sealion 7 went on sale in Hong Kong, its first major export market, on 30 September 2024. It is available with a 230 kW (308 hp; 313 PS) rear-wheel drive model and a 390 kW (523 hp; 530 PS) all-wheel drive model.

==== India ====
The Sealion 7 was launched in India on 17 February 2025 with deliveries later commenced on 7 March 2025, in two variants: Premium RWD and Performance AWD.

In August 2026, the entry-level Dynamic RWD trim using the smaller 91.3 kWh battery pack was introduced to the line-up.

==== Indonesia ====
The Sealion 7 was launched in Indonesia at the 32nd Indonesia International Motor Show on 13 February 2025 in two variants: Premium RWD and Performance AWD.

==== Malaysia ====
The Sealion 7 was launched in Malaysia on 14 November 2024 in two variants: Premium RWD and Performance AWD. In July 2026, the entry-level Dynamic RWD variant using the 91.3 kWh battery pack was added to the line-up.

==== Philippines ====
The Sealion 7 was launched in the Philippines on 28 May 2026 in the sole variant: Performance AWD.

==== Singapore ====
The Sealion 7 was launched in Singapore on 13 January 2025 in two variants: Premium RWD and Performance AWD. The entry-level Dynamic RWD variant, equipped with the smaller 71.8 kWh battery has a power output of 100 kW (134 hp; 136 PS) eligible for the Category A Certificate of Entitlement (COE) bracket, was added in September 2025.

==== Thailand ====
The Sealion 7 was launched in Thailand at the 41st Thailand International Motor Expo on 28 November 2024, in two variants: Premium RWD and Performance AWD.

On 21 August 2026, an Ultimate AWD variant was added to the line-up, featuring an upgraded 91.39 kWh 800V LFP Blade Battery, 230 kW DC charging, and an extended range of up to 600 km (373 mi).

=== Europe ===
The Sealion 7 was introduced in Europe at the Paris Motor Show on 14 October 2024. It is available with a 91.3 kWh battery pack for the top all-wheel drive model, which is based on the e-Platform 3.0 Evo platform with DC fast charging speed at up to 230 kW.

=== Mexico ===
The Sealion 7 was launched in Mexico on 13 January 2025, in a sole variant using the 82.5 kWh battery pack.

=== Oceania ===
==== Australia ====
The Sealion 7 was launched in Australia on 12 February 2025 in two variants: Premium RWD and Performance AWD.

It was BYD's best-selling full EV (and the market's second best) in Australia in 2025.

==== New Zealand ====
The Sealion 7 was launched in New Zealand on 19 February 2025 in two variants: Premium and Performance.

=== South Africa ===
The Sealion 7 was launched in South Africa on 4 April 2025, alongside the Shark 6 and Sealion 6. It is available in two variants: Premium RWD and Performance AWD.

== Powertrain ==
=== China ===
In China, two LFP blade battery options of 71.8 kWh and 80.64 kWh are available. The former capable of charging at up to 180 kW and the latter at up to 240 kW. Both battery options can charge from 10 to 80% within 25 minutes, and the car has vehicle-to-grid capability.

Type	Battery	Layout	Electric motor		Power	Torque	0–100 km/h (0–62 mph) (claimed)	Range (claimed)	Calendar years
Type	Battery	Layout	Electric motor		Power	Torque	0–100 km/h (0–62 mph) (claimed)	CLTC	Calendar years
550 Standard Range	71.8 kWh LFP Blade battery	RWD	Rear	TZ200XYT PMSM	170 kW (228 hp; 231 PS)	380 N⋅m (38.7 kg⋅m; 280 lb⋅ft)	7.3 seconds	550 km (342 mi)	2024–present
610 Long Range	80.64 kWh LFP Blade battery	RWD	Rear	TZ200XYT PMSM	230 kW (308 hp; 313 PS)	380 N⋅m (38.7 kg⋅m; 280 lb⋅ft)	6.7 seconds	610 km (379 mi)	2024–present
550 AWD	80.64 kWh LFP Blade battery	AWD	Front	YS210XYA PMSM	160 kW (215 hp; 218 PS)	310 N⋅m (31.6 kg⋅m; 229 lb⋅ft)	4.2 seconds	550 km (342 mi)	2024–present
550 AWD	80.64 kWh LFP Blade battery	AWD	Rear	TZ200XYT PMSM	230 kW (308 hp; 313 PS)	380 N⋅m (38.7 kg⋅m; 280 lb⋅ft)	4.2 seconds	550 km (342 mi)	2024–present
550 AWD	80.64 kWh LFP Blade battery	AWD	Combined:		390 kW (523 hp; 530 PS)	690 N⋅m (70.4 kg⋅m; 509 lb⋅ft)	4.2 seconds	550 km (342 mi)	2024–present

=== Outside China ===
Type	Battery	Layout	Electric motor		Power	Torque	0–100 km/h (0–62 mph) (claimed)	Range (claimed)		Calendar years
Type	Battery	Layout	Electric motor		Power	Torque	0–100 km/h (0–62 mph) (claimed)	NEDC	WLTP	Calendar years
RWD (100 kW)	71.8 kWh LFP Blade battery	RWD	Rear	TZ200XYT PMSM	100 kW (134 hp; 136 PS)	380 N⋅m (38.7 kg⋅m; 280 lb⋅ft)	11.8 seconds	520 km (323 mi)	405 km (252 mi)	2025–present (Singapore and Nepal)
RWD	71.8 kWh LFP Blade battery	RWD	Rear	TZ200XYT PMSM	170 kW (228 hp; 231 PS)	380 N⋅m (38.7 kg⋅m; 280 lb⋅ft)	7.3 seconds	520 km (323 mi)	405 km (252 mi)	2026–present
RWD	82.56 kWh LFP Blade battery	RWD	Rear	TZ200XYT PMSM	230 kW (308 hp; 313 PS)	380 N⋅m (38.7 kg⋅m; 280 lb⋅ft)	6.7 seconds	567 km (352 mi)	482 km (300 mi)	2024–present
AWD	82.56 kWh LFP Blade battery	AWD	Front	YS210XYA PMSM	160 kW (215 hp; 218 PS)	310 N⋅m (31.6 kg⋅m; 229 lb⋅ft)	4.5 seconds	542 km (337 mi)	456 km (283 mi)	2024–present
AWD	82.56 kWh LFP Blade battery	AWD	Rear	TZ200XYT PMSM	230 kW (308 hp; 313 PS)	380 N⋅m (38.7 kg⋅m; 280 lb⋅ft)	4.5 seconds	542 km (337 mi)	456 km (283 mi)	2024–present
AWD	82.56 kWh LFP Blade battery	AWD	Combined:		390 kW (523 hp; 530 PS)	690 N⋅m (70.4 kg⋅m; 509 lb⋅ft)	4.5 seconds	542 km (337 mi)	456 km (283 mi)	2024–present
RWD (800V)	91.3 kWh LFP Blade battery (800V)	RWD	Rear	TZ200XYT PMSM	230 kW (308 hp; 313 PS)	380 N⋅m (38.7 kg⋅m; 280 lb⋅ft)	6.9 seconds	650 km (404 mi)	550 km (342 mi)	2026–present
AWD (Europe)	91.3 kWh LFP Blade battery (800V)	AWD	Front	YS210XYA PMSM	160 kW (215 hp; 218 PS)	310 N⋅m (31.6 kg⋅m; 229 lb⋅ft)	4.5 seconds	600 km (373 mi)	502 km (312 mi)	2024–present
AWD (Europe)	91.3 kWh LFP Blade battery (800V)	AWD	Rear	TZ200XYT PMSM	230 kW (308 hp; 313 PS)	380 N⋅m (38.7 kg⋅m; 280 lb⋅ft)	4.5 seconds	600 km (373 mi)	502 km (312 mi)	2024–present
AWD (Europe)	91.3 kWh LFP Blade battery (800V)	AWD	Combined:		390 kW (523 hp; 530 PS)	690 N⋅m (70.4 kg⋅m; 509 lb⋅ft)	4.5 seconds	600 km (373 mi)	502 km (312 mi)	2024–present

== Safety ==
Euro NCAP test results BYD Sealion 7 Comfort (LHD) (2025)
Test	Points	%
Overall:	5 /5 stars	
Adult occupant:	34.8	87%
Child occupant:	46	93%
Pedestrian:	48.4	76%
Safety assist:	14.3	79%

C-NCAP (2024) test results 2024 BYD Sealion 07 EV 610 Long-Range
Category		%
Overall:	5 /5 stars	87.3%
Occupant protection:		93.79%
Vulnerable road users:		74.57%
Active safety:		85.65%

ANCAP test results BYD SEALION 7 (2025, aligned with Euro NCAP)
Test	Points	%
Overall:	5 /5 stars	
Adult occupant:	35.83	87%
Child occupant:	45.81	93%
Pedestrian:	48.44	76%
Safety assist:	14.21	78%

== Sales and production ==
Year	Sales					Total production
Year	China	Australia	Indonesia	Malaysia	Thailand	Total production
2024	39,376			641		62,518
2025	23,991	13,410	7,461	4,454	8,372	121,842

== See also ==
- List of BYD Auto vehicles
