= BYD Song L EV =

Battery electric mid-size crossover SUV

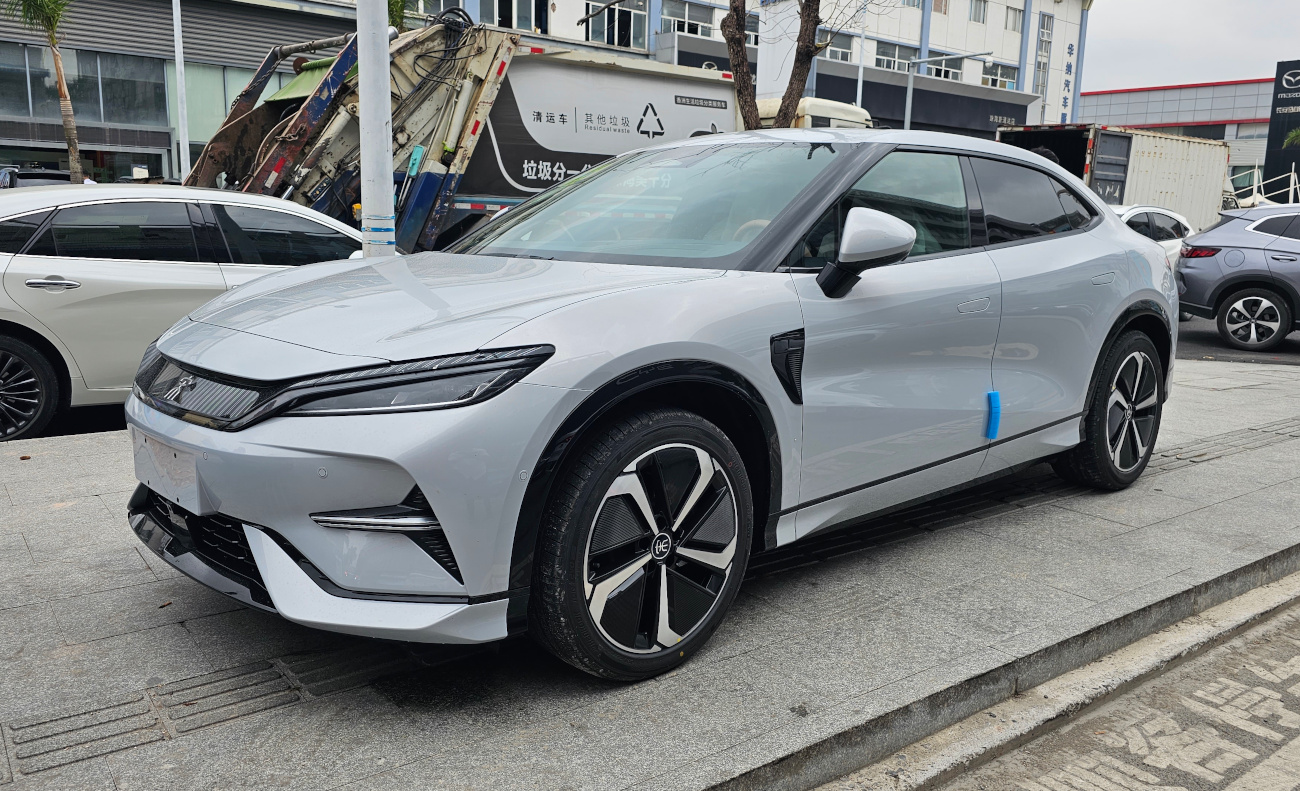

Overview
- Manufacturer: BYD Auto
- Production: December 2023 – present
- Assembly: China: Shenzhen, Guangdong; Changsha, Hunan; Hefei, Anhui
- Designer: Under the lead of Wolfgang Egger

Body and chassis
- Class: Mid-size SUV
- Body style: 5-door crossover SUV
- Layout: Rear-motor, rear-wheel-drive; Dual-motor, all-wheel-drive
- Platform: e-Platform 3.0
- Chassis: Unibody
- Related: Denza N7; BYD Sealion 07 EV; BYD Seal; BYD Seal 06 GT

Powertrain
- Electric motor: Permanent magnet synchronous
- Power output: 150 kW (201 hp; 204 PS); 230 kW (308 hp; 313 PS); 380 kW (510 hp; 517 PS)
- Battery: 71.8 kWh BYD Blade LFP; 87.04 kWh BYD Blade LFP
- Range: 550 km (342 mi); 662 km (411 mi); 602 km (374 mi)

Dimensions
- Wheelbase: 2,930 mm (115.4 in)
- Length: 4,840 mm (190.6 in)
- Width: 1,950 mm (76.8 in)
- Height: 1,560 mm (61.4 in)
- Kerb weight: 2,158–2,385 kg (4,758–5,258 lb)

The BYD Song L EV (Chinese: 比亚迪宋L EV) is a battery electric mid-size SUV manufactured by BYD Auto since 2023. Part of the BYD Song family under the 'Dynasty Series' product line-up, the Song L has the largest footprint among other Song vehicles. While the vehicle shares the same name with the BYD Song L DM-i, both models have minimal relation in styling and mechanical components.

The Song L occupies the Chinese B-class category, or D-segment globally. It is based on the e-Platform 3.0 shared with other BYD battery electric vehicles such as the Seal.

== History ==
The model was first showcased as a prototype model in April 2023 at the Shanghai Auto Show. The production version was introduced in August 2023 at the Chengdu Auto Show, with pre-sales starting in November 2023.

== Design and equipment ==
The Song L design features BYD's updated 'Dragon Face' design language. With a low roof design, electric rear wing and hidden door handles, BYD claims the Song L has a coefficient of drag as low as 0.255 Cd. It is marketed in both front-motor two-wheel drive and dual-motor four-wheel drive versions that are integrated with CTB (cell-to-body) battery technology and BYD's DiSus suspension system.

The Song L is equipped with a 12-speaker Dynaudio audio system, NFC card, 10.25-inch LCD instrument panel, a 15.6-inch central control screen, a 50-inch AR head-up display with BYD's DiLink latest operating system and DiPilot advanced driver-assistance system.

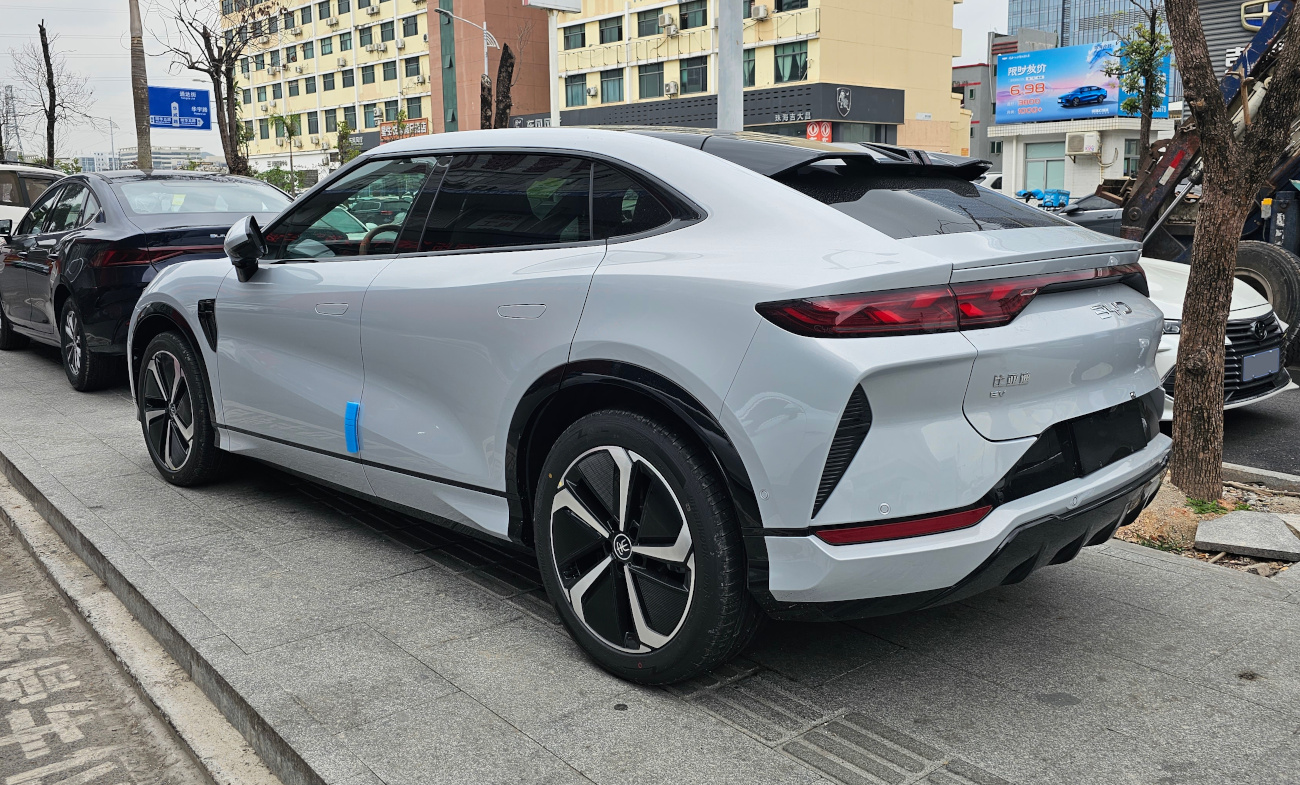
Rear view

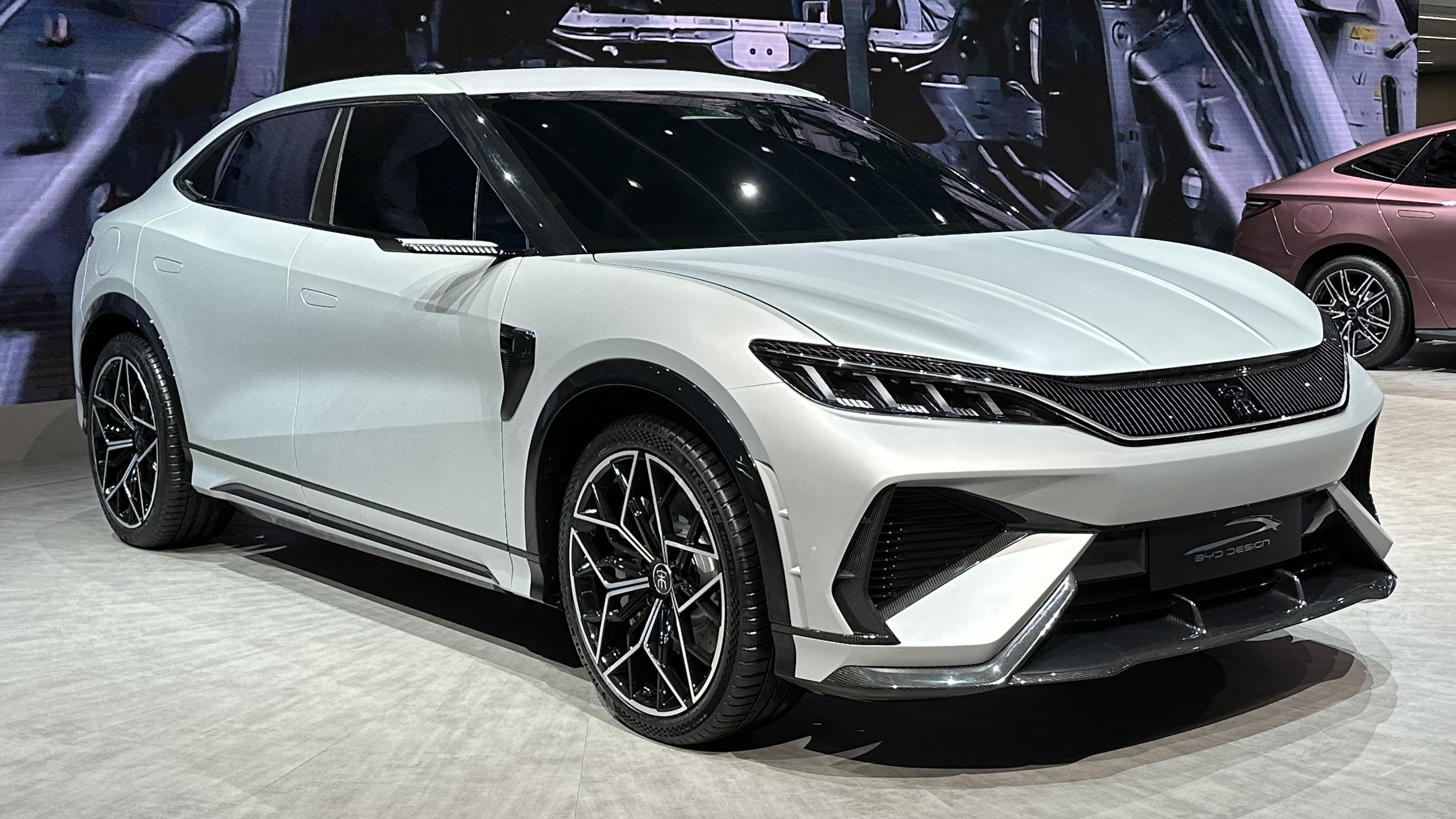
BYD Song L concept, showcased in April 2023 at the Shanghai Auto Show

== Powertrain ==
The line-up is available in single and dual-motor versions. Single motor versions has either 150 kW (201 hp; 204 PS) or 230 kW (308 hp; 313 PS) of peak power, while the dual-motor version adds a 150 kW (201 hp; 204 PS) front motor for 380 kW (510 hp; 517 PS) combined maximum power output. Powered by BYD's Blade battery (71.8 kWh or 87.04 kWh), the single motor is rated at 550 km (342 mi) or 662 km (411 mi) of CLTC range, respectively. The dual-motor version is powered by an 87.04 kWh Blade battery with 602 km (374 mi) of CLTC range. The top speed is limited at 201 km/h (125 mph), while the Turkish expressway top speed reported capable of reaching 207 km/h (129 mph).

== Sales ==
Year	China
2023	4,988
2024	46,683
2025	14,508

== See also ==
- List of BYD Auto vehicles
