= Denza 500 =

Chinese automobile

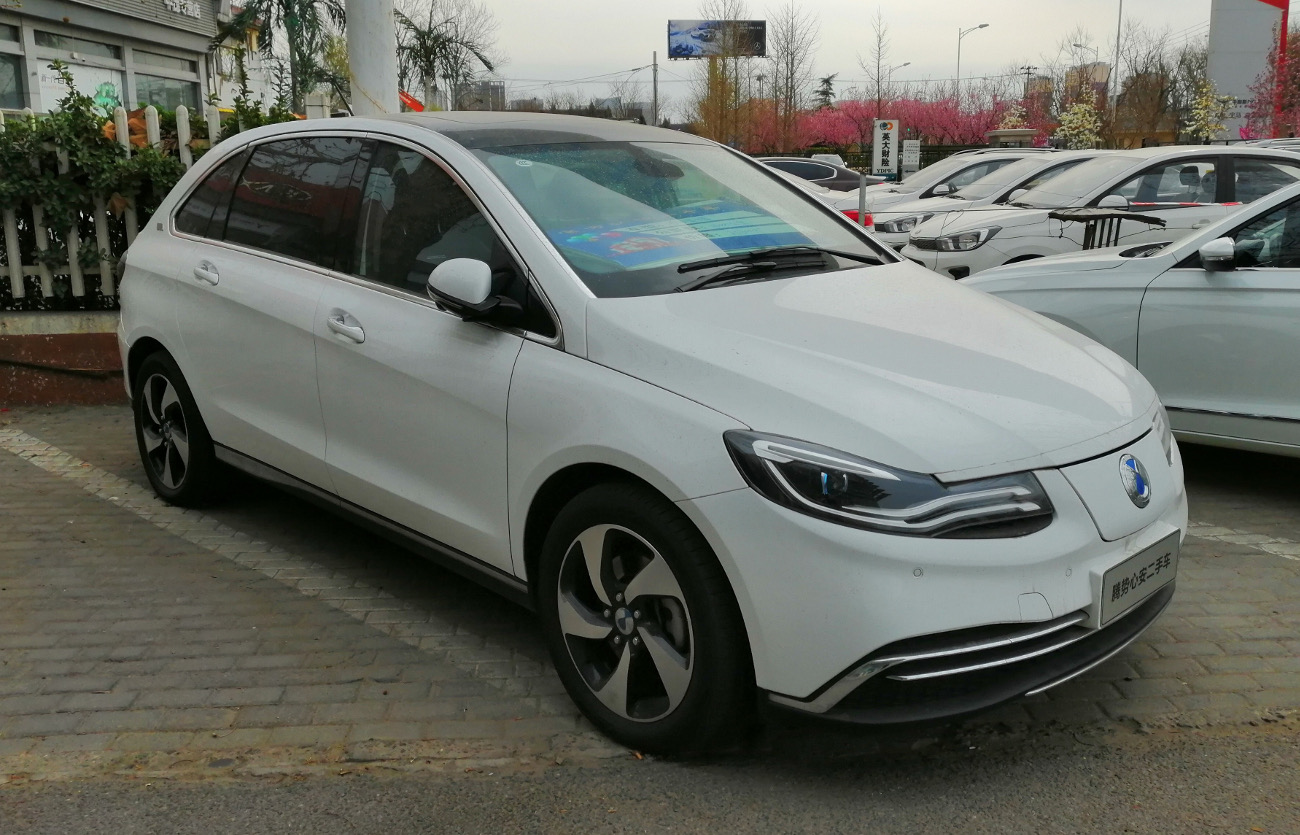

Overview
- Manufacturer: Denza
- Also called: Denza EV (2013); Denza 400 (2014–2018)
- Production: 2014–2019
- Assembly: China: Shenzhen, Guangdong
- Designer: Olivier Boulay

Body and chassis
- Class: Subcompact car
- Body style: 5-door hatchback
- Layout: Front-motor, front-wheel-drive; Dual-motor, four-wheel-drive

Powertrain
- Electric motor: One or two permanent magnet synchronous motors
- Power output: 135 kW (184 PS; 181 hp) (FWD); 211 kW (287 PS; 283 hp) (AWD)
- Battery: 61–70 kWh (LiFePO_{4})
- Range: 300 km (186 mi); 400 km (249 mi) (Denza 400); 500 km (311 mi) (Denza 500)

Dimensions
- Wheelbase: 2,699 mm (106.3 in)
- Length: 4,642 mm (183 in)
- Width: 1,850 mm (73 in)
- Height: 1,642 mm (65 in)

The Denza EV, Denza 400 and the Denza 500 are different names of a Chinese electric car produced by Denza, a joint venture between BYD Auto and Daimler AG.

== Description ==
A March 2018 preview report said that features include LED lamps front and back, cold weather capability, and a 9-inch infotainment touchscreen with navigation info from Baidu Maps that can also help locate charging stations. There were 112,000 such stations in China at the time. The new vehicle was to be sold at select Mercedes-Benz dealers in China.

The 2018 facelift also resulted in a restyled front fascia, rear bumper and tail lamps, an updated interior, and a name change to Denza 500. Range of the Denza 500 is said to be 451 kilometres (280 miles) measured by the NEDC standard. This is the latest version of the Denza electric car made exclusively for the Chinese market.

The battery pack of the Denza 500 was upgraded to 70 kWh, up from the previous 62 kWh in the Denza EV. According to Denza, the consumption is 15.9 kWh per 100 kilometres, and a range of 635 kilometres (394 miles) could be achieved.

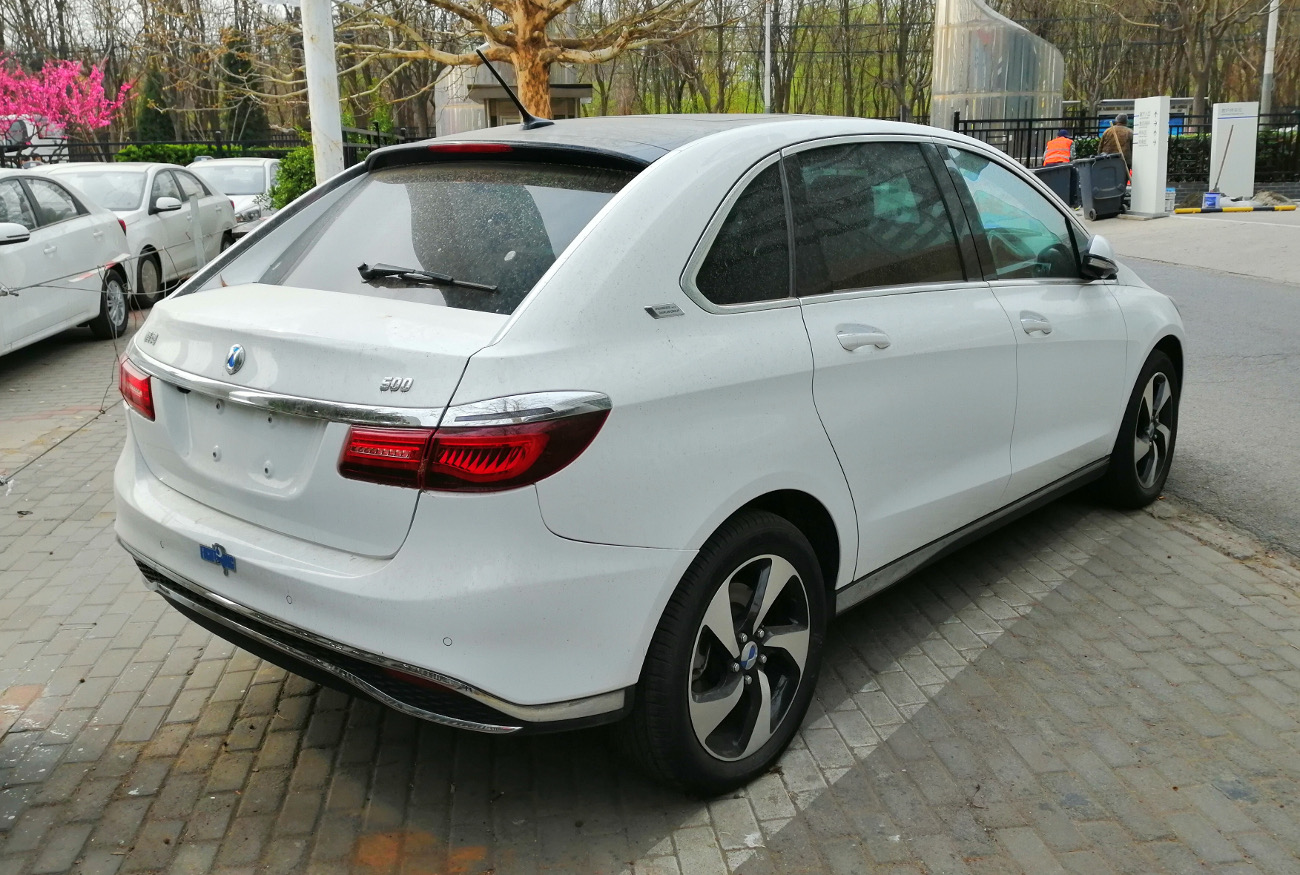
Denza 500 rear

== Denza EV ==
An earlier electric car from Denza was the Denza EV, which was previewed as a concept car by Denza at the 2012 Beijing Auto Show, and was further tested as a prototype during the 2013 Shanghai Auto Show. The Denza EV is based on the same platform as the Mercedes-Benz B-Class while the electric powertrain comes from the BYD e6 electric car producing 137 kW (184 hp) on Front wheels motor with the top speed of 150 km/h (93 mph). It was reintroduced in 2016 as the Denza 400 with a larger battery.

The Denza EV had a range of 352 km (218 mi) when launched in 2014; in 2017, Denza had launched a 400 km (248 mi) version.

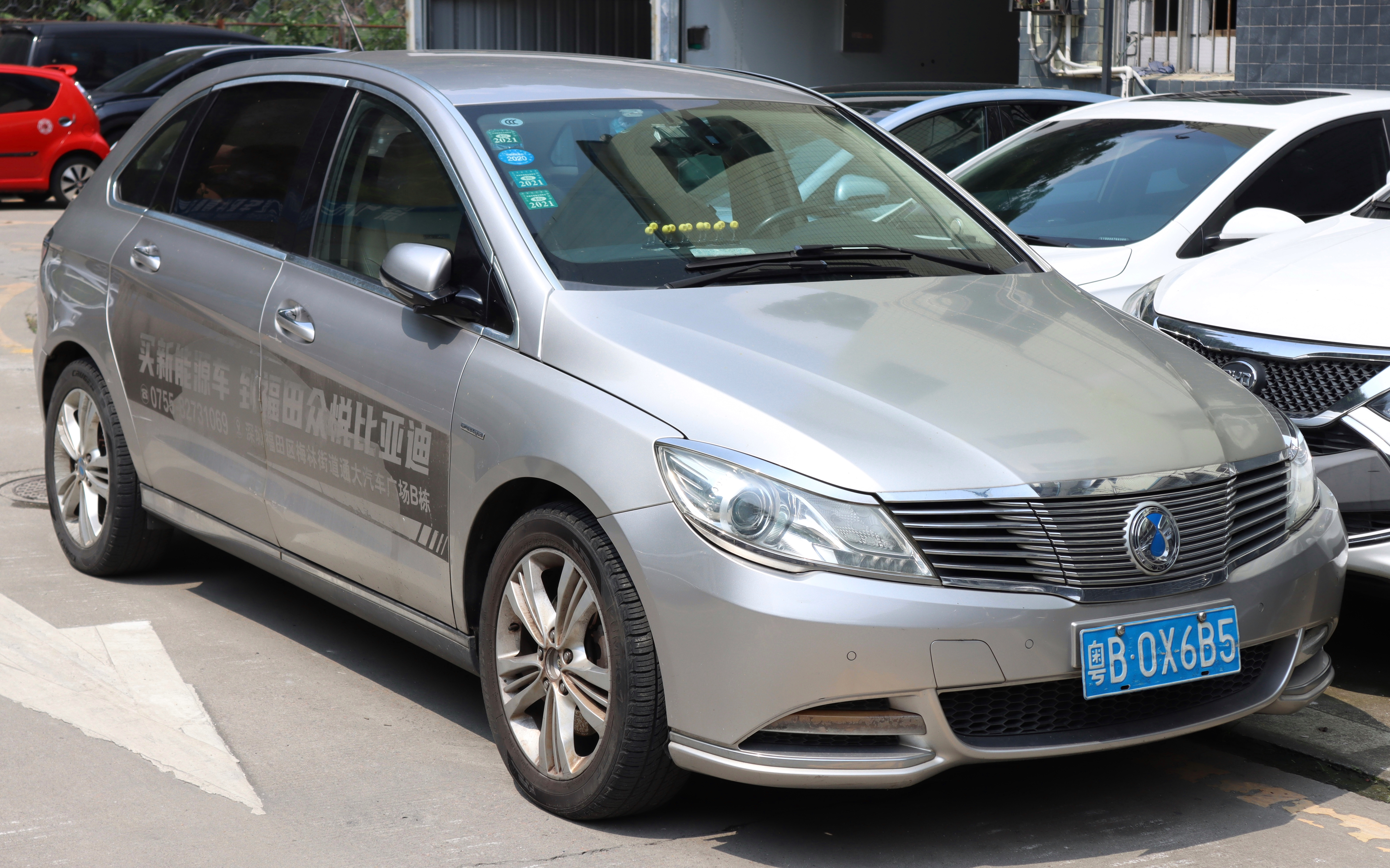
Denza EV front

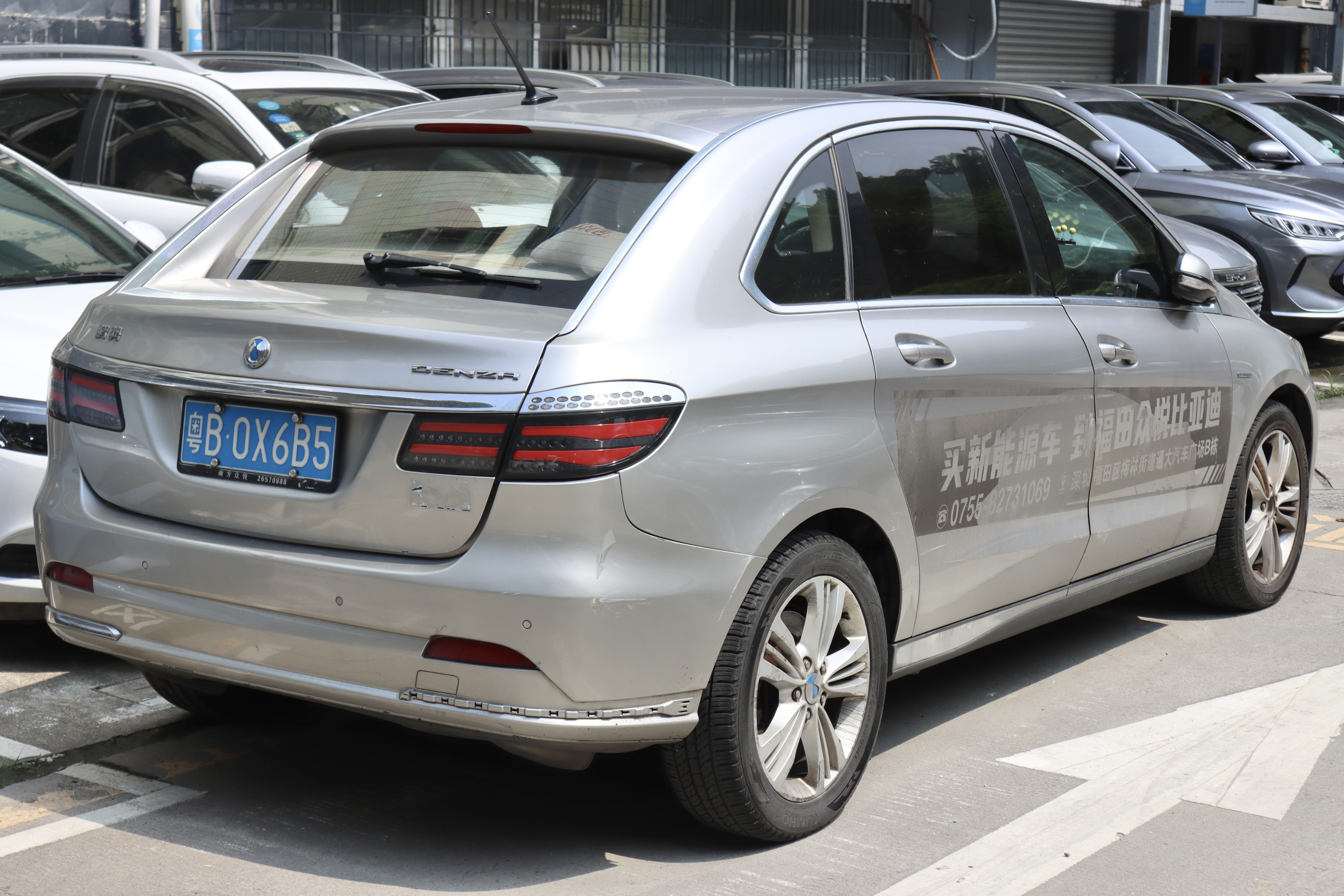
Denza EV rear

== See also ==
- BYD e6
- Mercedes-Benz B-Class
- Electric car
- Government incentives for plug-in electric vehicles
- List of electric cars currently available
- List of modern production plug-in electric vehicles
- New energy vehicles in China
- Plug-in electric vehicle
