= Denza N7 =

Battery electric mid-size crossover SUV

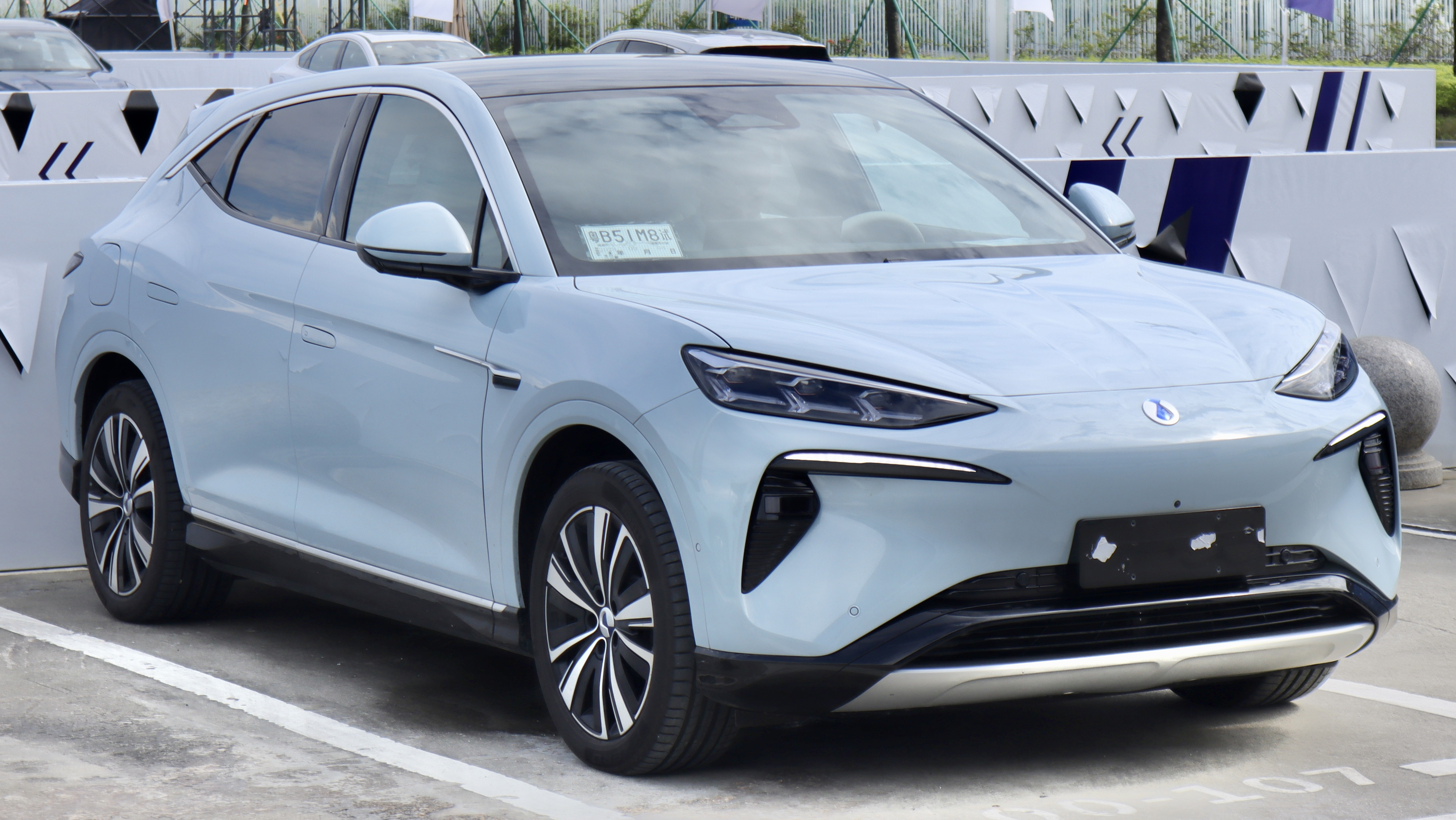

Overview
- Manufacturer: BYD Auto
- Production: June 2023 – 2026
- Model years: 2024–2027
- Assembly: China: Jinan, Shandong
- Designer: Under the lead of Wolfgang Egger

Body and chassis
- Class: Mid-size SUV
- Body style: 5-door crossover SUV
- Layout: Rear-motor, rear-wheel-drive; Dual-motor, all-wheel-drive
- Platform: e-Platform 3.0
- Related: BYD Song L EV; BYD Sealion 07 EV; BYD Seal; BYD Seal 06 GT

Powertrain
- Electric motor: TZ200XYC permanent magnet
- Power output: 230–390 kW (313–530 PS; 308–523 hp)
- Transmission: Single-speed gear reduction
- Battery: 91.392 kWh
- Range: 702 km (436 mi)
- Plug-in charging: 150 kW DC; 230 kW DC (when connected to two plugs simultaneously)

Dimensions
- Wheelbase: 2,940 mm (115.7 in)
- Length: 4,860 mm (191.3 in)
- Width: 1,935 mm (76.2 in)
- Height: 1,602 mm (63.1 in)
- Curb weight: 2,655–2,815 kg (5,853–6,206 lb)

The Denza N7 (Chinese: 腾势N7; pinyin: Téngshì N7) is a battery electric mid-size SUV marketed by Denza, a brand owned by Chinese manufacturer BYD Auto. It was officially launched in the Chinese market in July 2023.

== History ==
In August 2022, at the Chengdu Auto Show, The Denza presented the Denza Inception Concept prototype heralding the second model creating a new model range after restructuring. This vehicle was used extensively for the production car, which debuted in March 2023 under the name Denza N7, which took the form of an SUV Coupe with a gently sloping roofline sloping towards the rear. It is also the Denza model that is not sold outside China, except the Europe and Asia.

=== Design ===
The silhouette of the N7 has features multiple embossments and imitation air intakes, as well as retractable door handles and extensive front full LED lighting. Thanks to the use of LIDARs placed on the exterior, N7 enables semi-autonomous driving. The manufacturer decided to use ports located on both sides for charging the electrical system, placing them in the rear fenders.

The passenger cabin features a large center console extending towards the dashboard. It consists of three displays, with a digital gauge cluster in front of the driver and a second display in front of the passenger. Between them there is a large, touch screen multimedia system. A system from the French company Devialet was used for its sound system.

Denza N7 (pre-facelift)

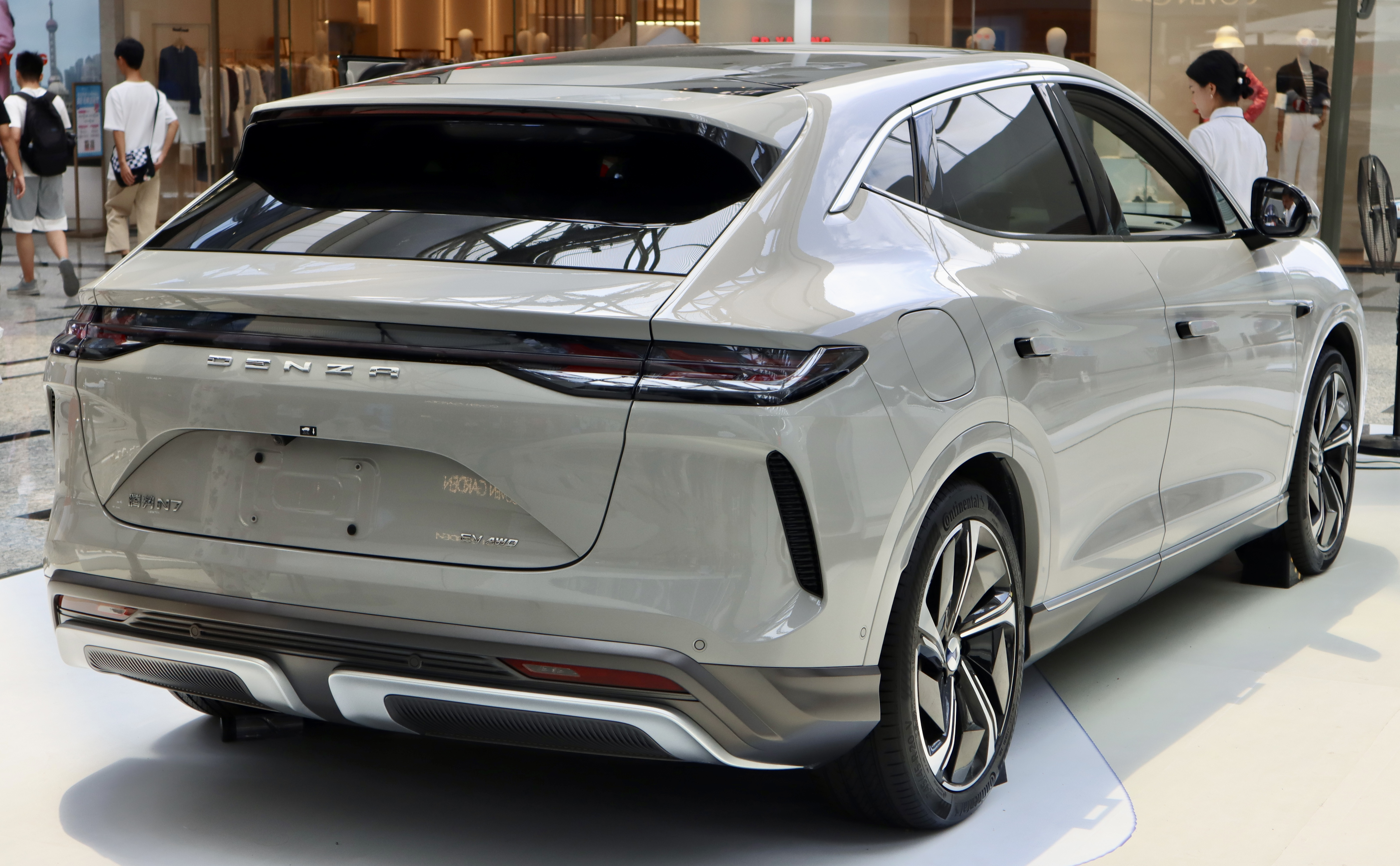
Rear view

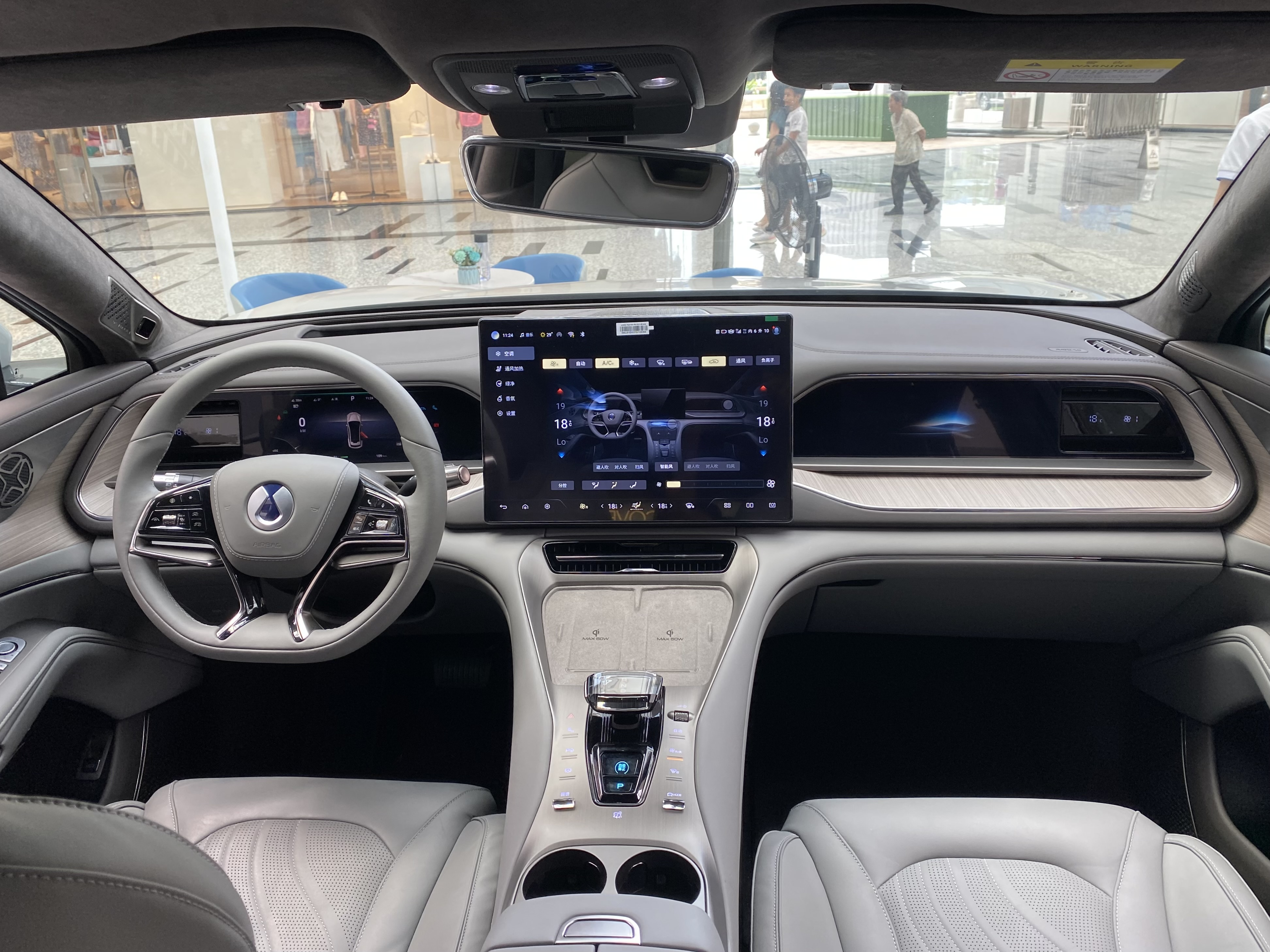
Interior

== Specifications ==
The basic electric version of the N7 powered by a 308 horsepower (230 kW; 312 PS) electric motor, while the top one has a power of 523 hp (390 kW; 530 PS), both units of which are shared with the BYD Seal.

== Model year changes ==
2024: The N7 was given a minor facelift with a new headlight and DRL design, similar to that of the Denza Z9.

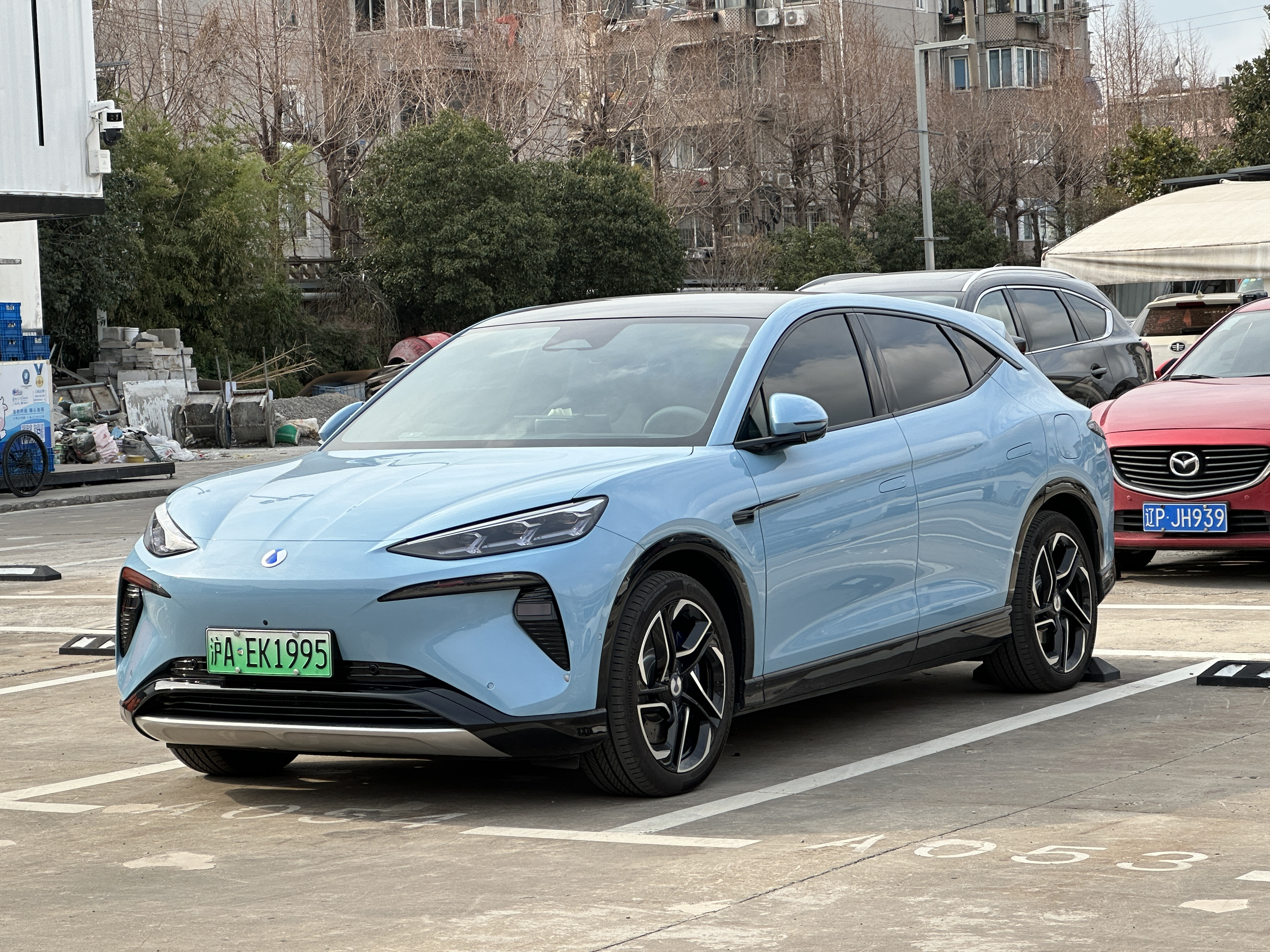
Denza N7 2024 (facelift)

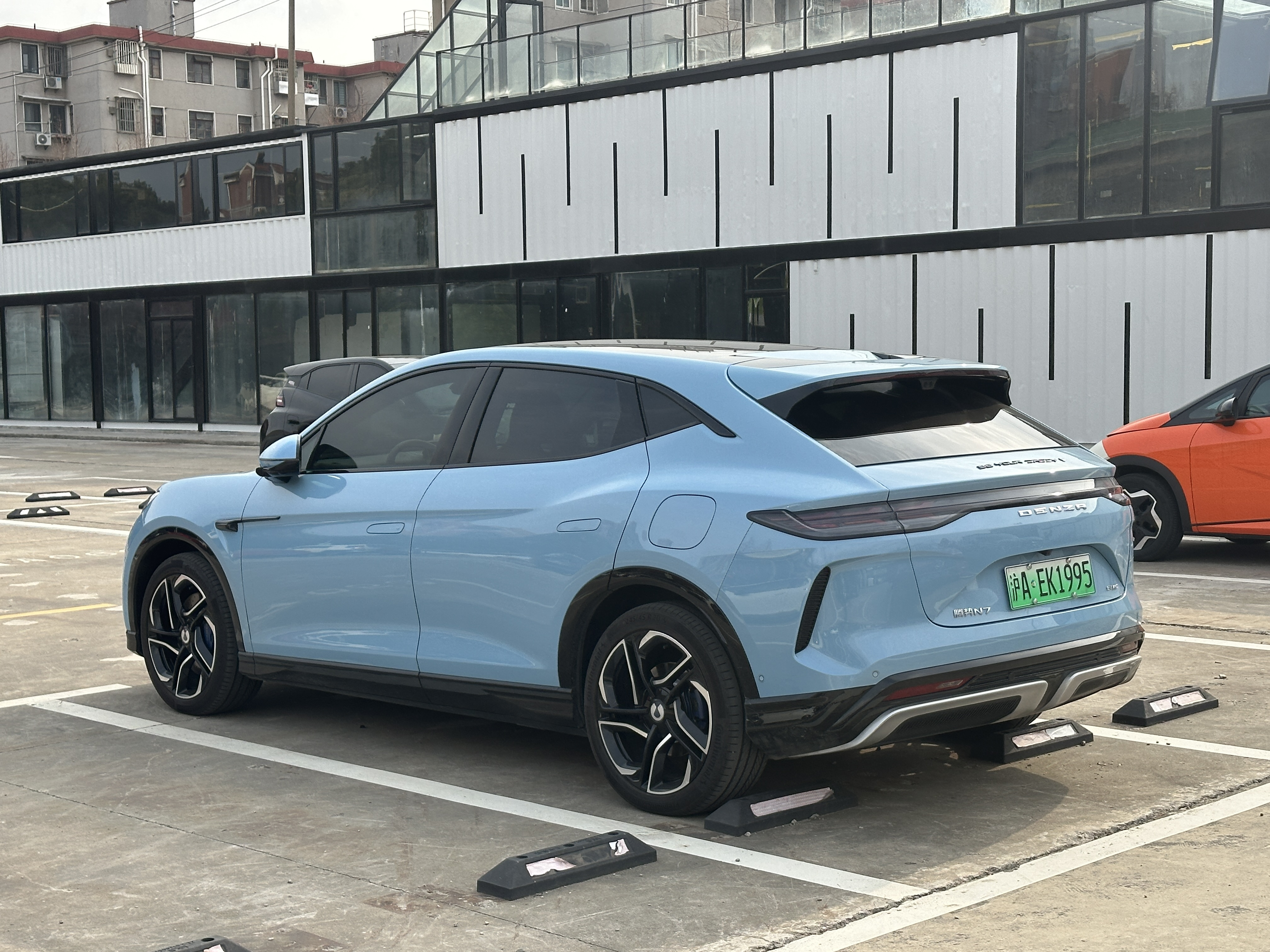
Rear view

2025: The BYD's "God's Eye" B intelligent driving system was added.

== Sales ==
Year	China
2023	5,174
2024	7,758
2025	1,592
