= Denza =

Chinese automobile manufacturing company owned by BYD Auto

Shenzhen Denza New Energy Co., Ltd.
- Logo since 2024
- Type: Joint venture (2010–2024); Subsidiary (2024–present)
- Industry: Automotive
- Predecessor: Shenzhen BYD Daimler New Technology Co., Ltd. (2010–2021)
- Founded: May 2010; 16 years ago
- Headquarters: Shenzhen, Guangdong, China
- Area served: Mainland China; Hong Kong; Southeast Asia; Oceania; Europe; Brazil; India
- Key people: Lian Yubo (CEO); Wolfgang Egger (design director)
- Products: Automobiles
- Production output: ▲157,134 vehicles (2025)
- Parent: BYD Auto Industry

Chinese name
- Simplified Chinese: 深圳腾势新能源汽车有限公司
- Hanyu Pinyin: Shēnzhèn Téngshì Xīn Néngyuán Qìchē Yǒuxiàn Gōngsī
- Website: denza.com tengshiauto.com (China)

Shenzhen Denza New Energy Co., Ltd., trading as Denza (Chinese: 腾势; pinyin: Téngshì), is an automobile manufacturing company and luxury plug-in electric vehicle brand owned by BYD Auto.

Denza was founded in May 2010 as a joint venture between BYD and Daimler AG (currently Mercedes-Benz Group). In late 2014, its first model, the Denza EV was put on sale in selected Chinese cities only. In late 2021, Denza underwent a restructuring as Mercedes-Benz reduced its share to 10%, while BYD held the rest. BYD started investing in new models, such as the D9 MPV, the N7 and N9 SUVs and the Z9 full-size car. In September 2024, Mercedes-Benz withdrew entirely by transferring its remaining 10% stake to BYD.

Denza began to export its vehicles in 2024, starting with Southeast Asia. In 2025, the brand entered Brazil, Europe and Middle East. Export vehicles from BYD's two other luxury subsidiaries, Yangwang and Fangchengbao, are also sold under the Denza brand.

In Indonesia, Denza was rebranded as Danza effective 1 October 2026, following a local trademark dispute over the Denza name.

== Name ==
An invented name from the Chinese Tengshi (simplified Chinese: 腾势; traditional Chinese: 騰勢; pinyin: Téngshì), Denza roughly translates to "rising power and momentum". Alternative translations include "win power" or "winning circumstances".

== History ==
=== Early period (2010–2021) ===
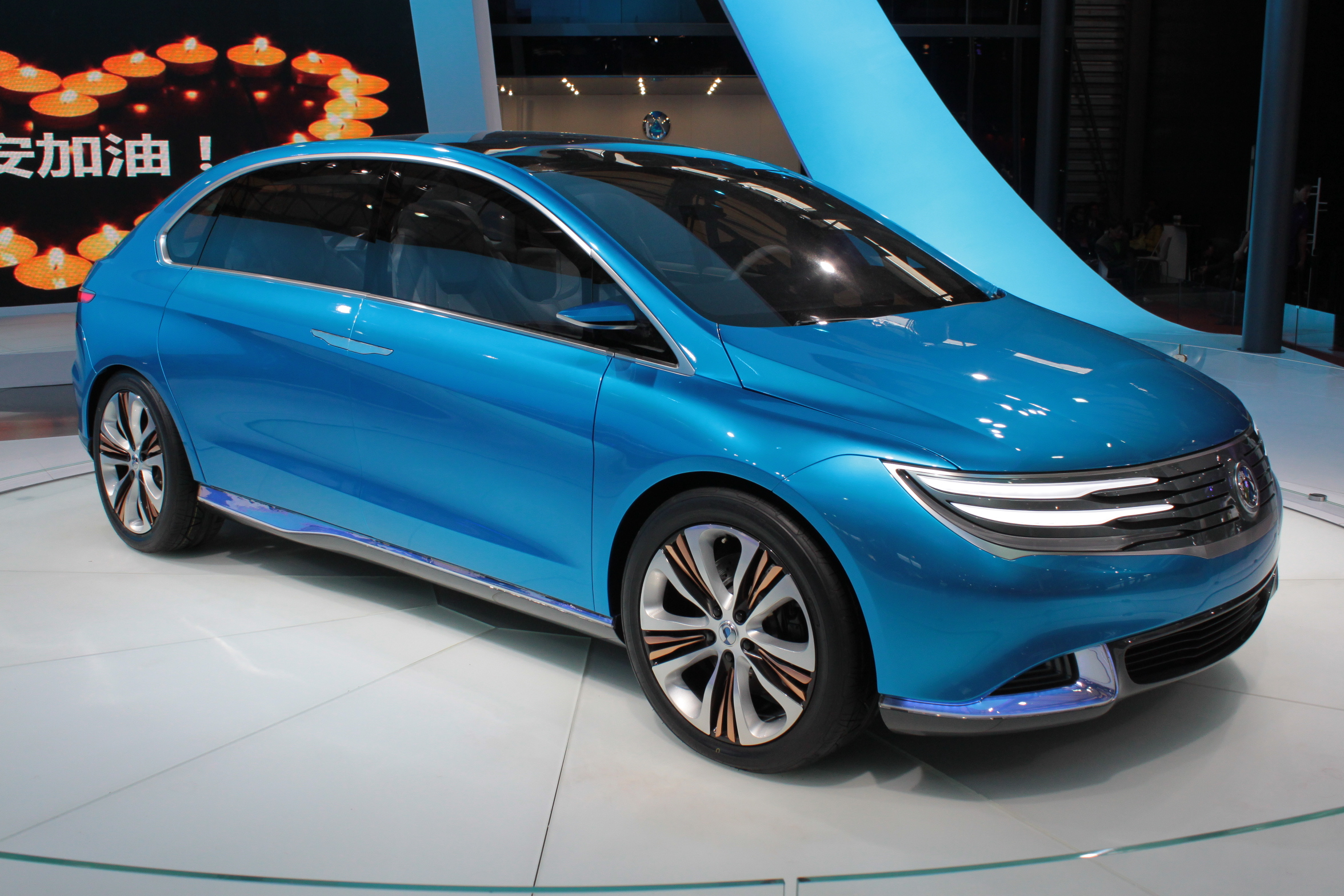
Denza all-electric concept car at Auto Shanghai 2013

On 1 March 2010, BYD Auto and Daimler AG signed a memorandum of understanding for the joint development of electric vehicles. The initial link-up led to the creation of a new, equal-ownership legal entity, Shenzhen BYD Daimler New Technology Co., Ltd. The company was formally established on 27 May 2010 and received a business license from the Chinese government in March 2011.

The brand name Denza was introduced in March 2012. During its introduction, BYD chairman and founder Wang Chuanfu highlighted that BYD contributes its expertise in battery technology, electric drive systems, and practical experience in deploying electric vehicles on Chinese roads, while Daimler complements this with its experience in designing premium automobiles, know-how of electric vehicle architecture and safety, and a legacy of over 125 years in the industry.

Denza showcased its first concept car in April 2012 at the Auto China motor show in Beijing. It was expected that this product would be offered as an electric luxury car.

By September 2014, BYD and Daimler had jointly invested more than €300 million into the joint venture. The brand's initial product was set to be launched in Beijing, Shanghai, and Shenzhen in September 2014, the launch date was then pushed back to late 2014. Its first model, the Denza EV debuted in December 2014.

When Denza launched its first car, sales of new energy vehicles depend on subsidies provided by the Chinese government. Purchasers of the car were qualified for a RMB 78,000 subsidy and while the total subsidy on offer depends on location of purchase, no more than RMB 120,000 can be deducted. As of 2014, buyers were exempted from Beijing's license plate lottery and qualified for free plates in Shanghai and Shenzhen.

In 2018, the Denza EV underwent extensive body restyling, changing its name to Denza 500. In November 2019, Denza presented its second model based on the second-generation BYD Tang. The vehicle was designed with significant participation of Mercedes-Benz designers, which handled exterior and interior design. Sales of the Denza X started at the end of 2020 exclusively on the Chinese market.

=== Restructuring (2021–present) ===
In February 2021, the German business daily Handelsblatt reported that the relations between Denza's co-owners were in crisis, as its sales did not meet the expectations of Daimler, which allegedly expressed a desire to end the venture. However, this information was denied. Changes in the joint venture structure was announced in December 2021. The unpopular Denza X SUV was discontinued, and the alliance changed its name to Shenzhen Denza New Energy Vehicle Co., Ltd. In turn, Mercedes-Benz Group reduced its shares from 50% to 10% in favor of BYD's higher stake of 90%.

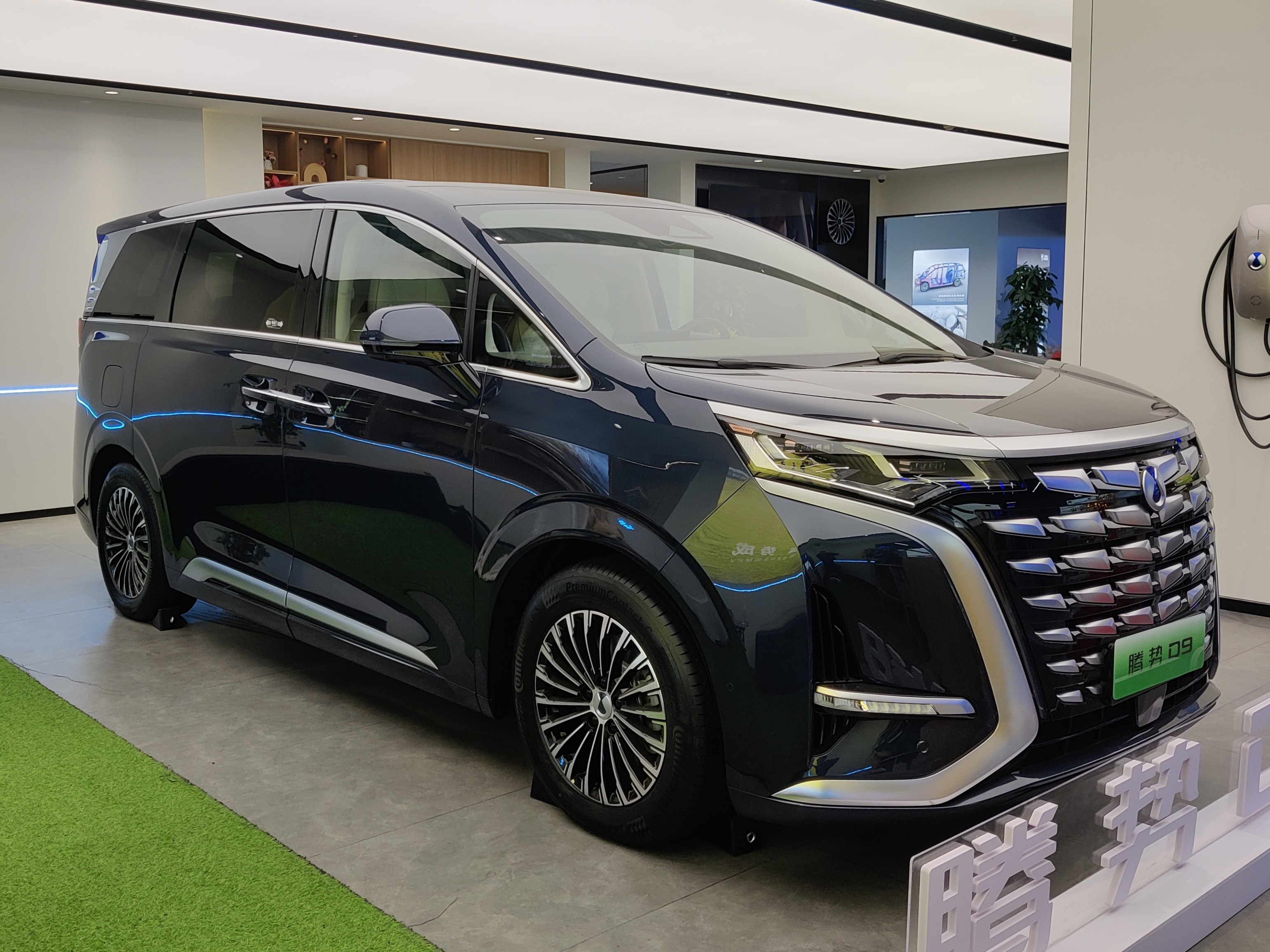
Denza D9 DM-i

The first model since the restructuring, the Denza D9 minivan was introduced in August 2022. The D9 is available in plug-in hybrid and battery electric variant. At the same time, the company announced the expansion of its dealer network in China with a plan to open 270 new points by the end of 2022 throughout the country. In March 2023, Denza introduced its second new model after restructuring, the Denza N7 battery electric SUV. In the same month, the range was expanded with a larger SUV Denza N8, which is based on the Denza X. Denza plans to release product lines starting with the D, E, N, Z, and A letters.

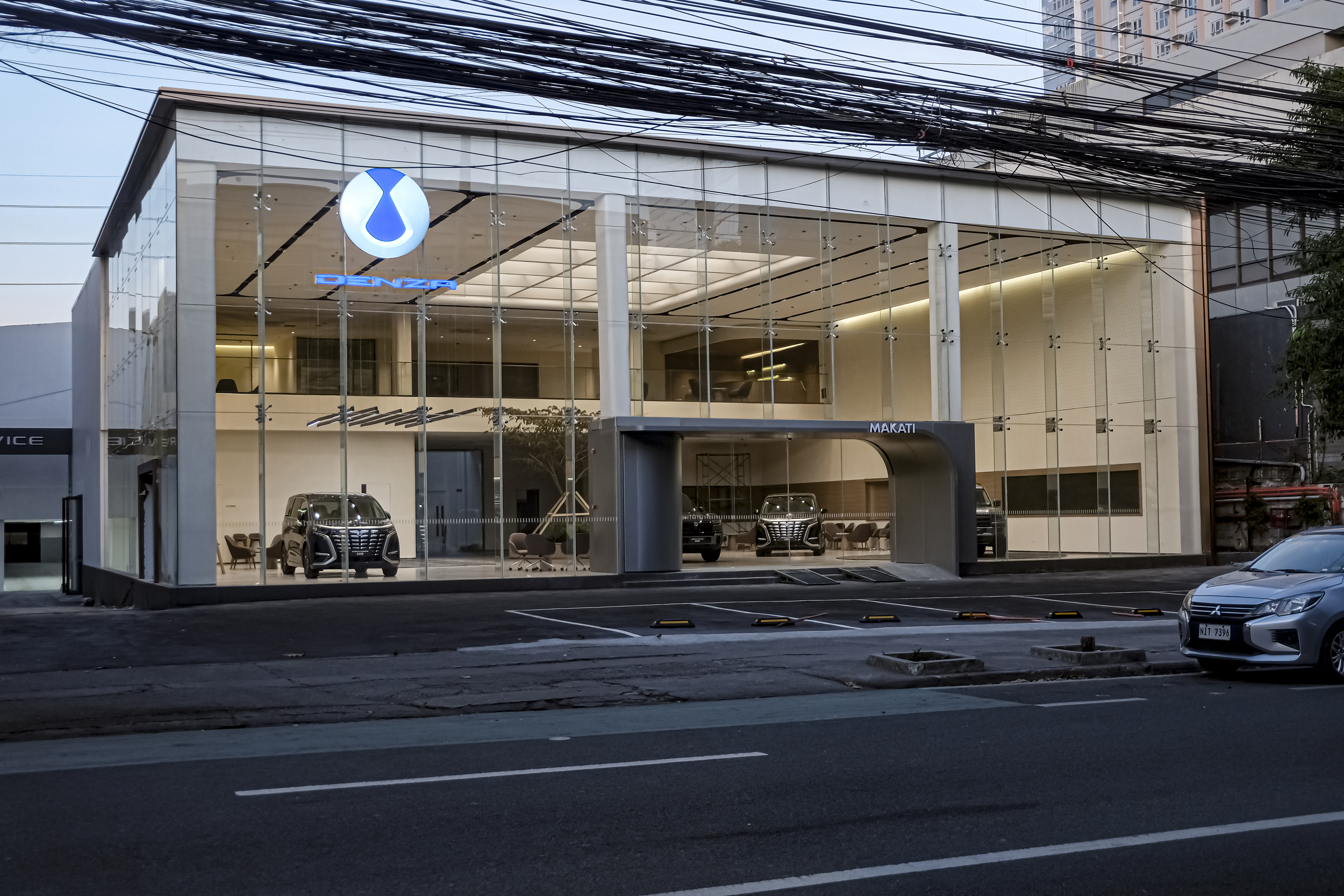
A Denza showroom in Makati, Philippines

In June 2024, Denza started sales of the right-hand drive D9 EV in Hong Kong. It opened its first flagship store in Kowloon Bay, which is the first presence of the brand outside mainland China.

In September 2024, Mercedes-Benz transferred its remaining 10% shareholding in Denza to BYD, making Denza a fully owned subsidiary of BYD.

In April 2025, Denza announced its entry in Europe with a brand launch event in Milan, Italy. Its first model will be the Denza Z9 GT.

In August 2025, Denza introduced two off-road SUVs, the Denza B5 and Denza B8, initially for Middle East markets. The models are rebranded from the Chinese market Fangchengbao Bao 5 and Fangchengbao Bao 8.

In December 2025, Denza announced its entry in Brazil market with Denza B5 and Z9 GT, mounths latter B5 Model leading brazilian premium market surpassing BMW 3 Series and BMW X1, both are made in Brazil desptite B5 it's imported from China.

In March 2026, Denza announced that English actor Daniel Craig will be Denza's global brand ambassador for 2026.

== Leadership ==
- Hans-Ulrich Maik (2010–2015)
- Arno van der Merwe (2015–2019)
- Hubertus Troska (2019–2021)
- Wang Chuanfu (2021–2022)
- Zhao Changjiang (2022–2025)
- Lian Yubo (2025–present)
- Debbie Bingles (2002-present)

== Products ==
=== Current models ===
- Denza D9 (2022–present), full-size MPV, BEV/PHEV
- Denza N8 (2026–present), full-size SUV, BEV/PHEV
- Denza N8L (2025–present), full-size SUV, BEV/PHEV
- Denza N9 (2025–present), full-size SUV, PHEV
- Denza Z9S (2026–present), full-size car, BEV
- Denza Z9 GT (2024–present), full-size fastback car, BEV/PHEV
- Denza Z (2026–present), sports car, BEV
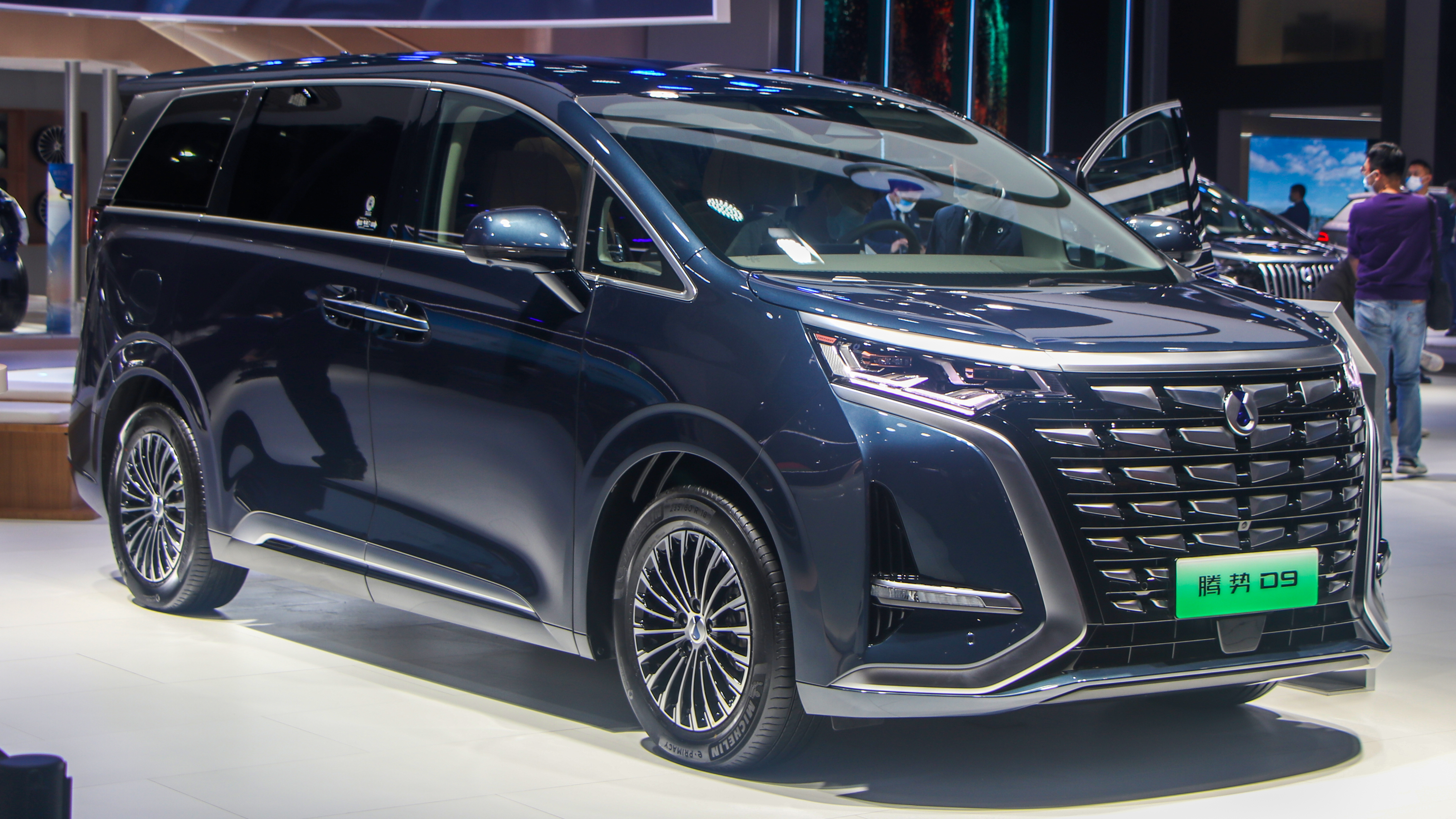
Denza D9

Denza N8

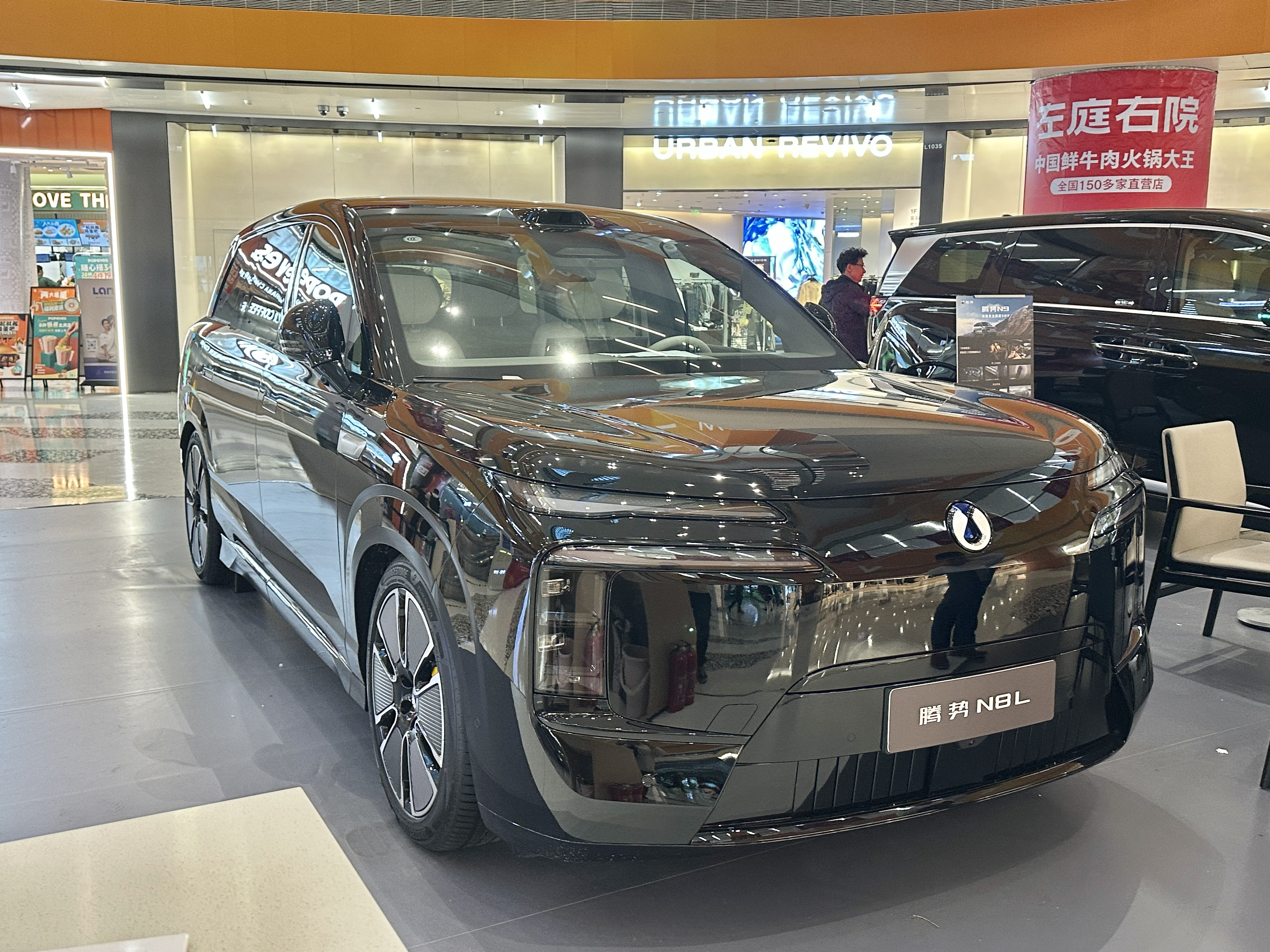
Denza N8L

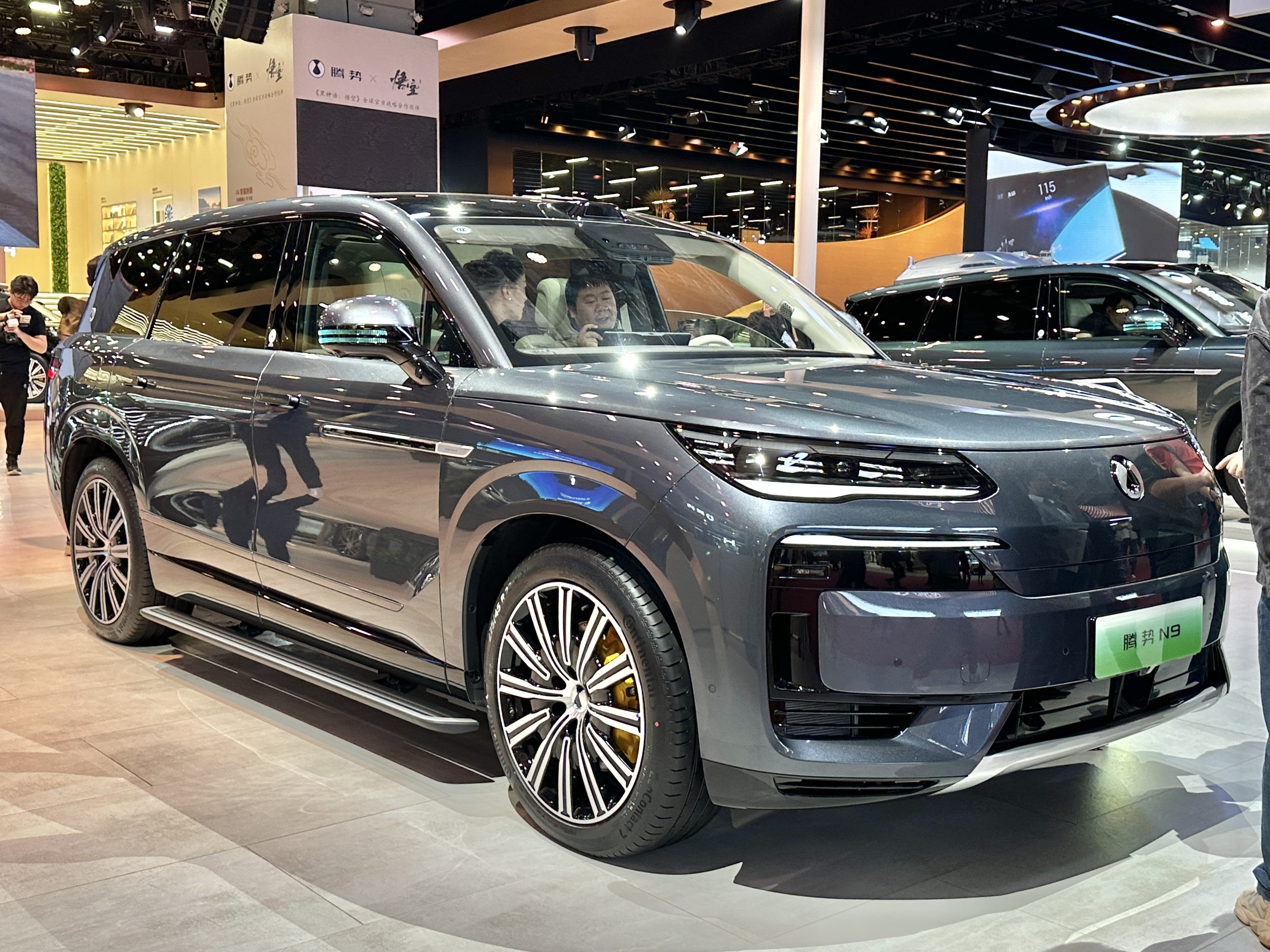
Denza N9

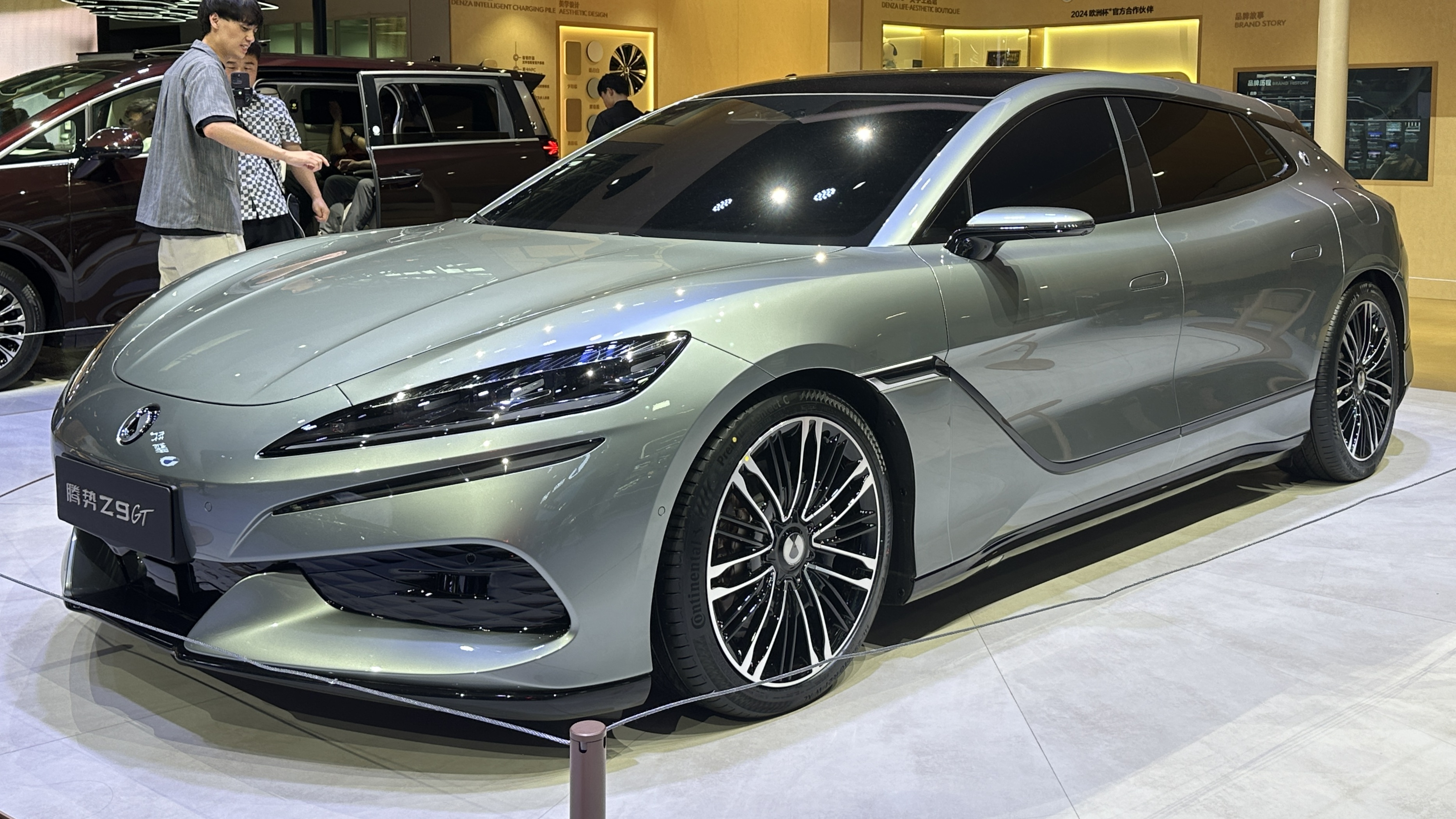
Denza Z9 GT

Denza Z9S

Denza Z

==== Export-only models ====
- Denza B3 (2026–present) — rebadged Fangchengbao Tai 3, compact SUV, BEV
- Denza B5 (2025–present) — rebadged Fangchengbao Bao 5, mid-size SUV, PHEV
- Denza B8 (2025–present) — rebadged Fangchengbao Bao 8, large SUV, PHEV
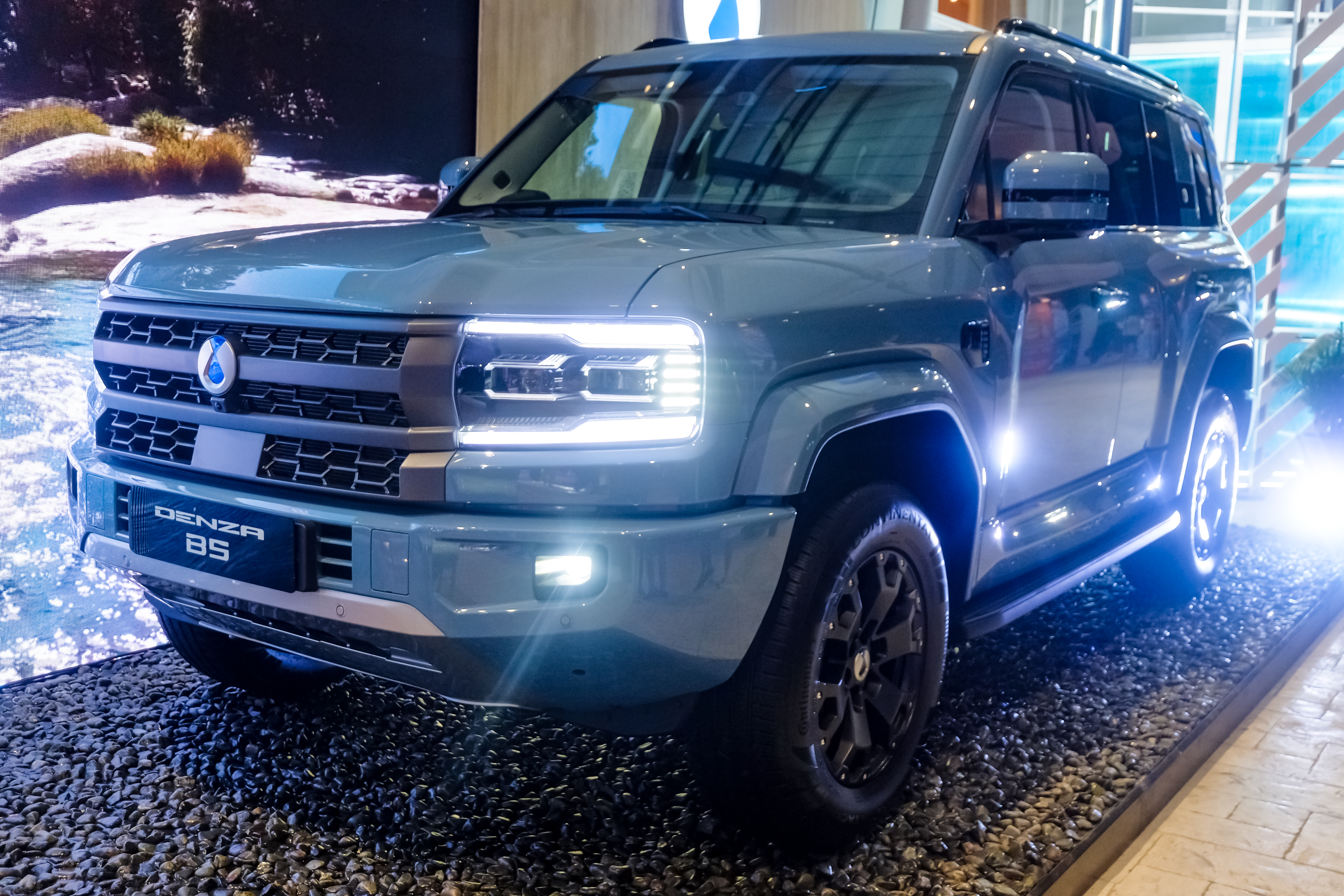
Denza B5

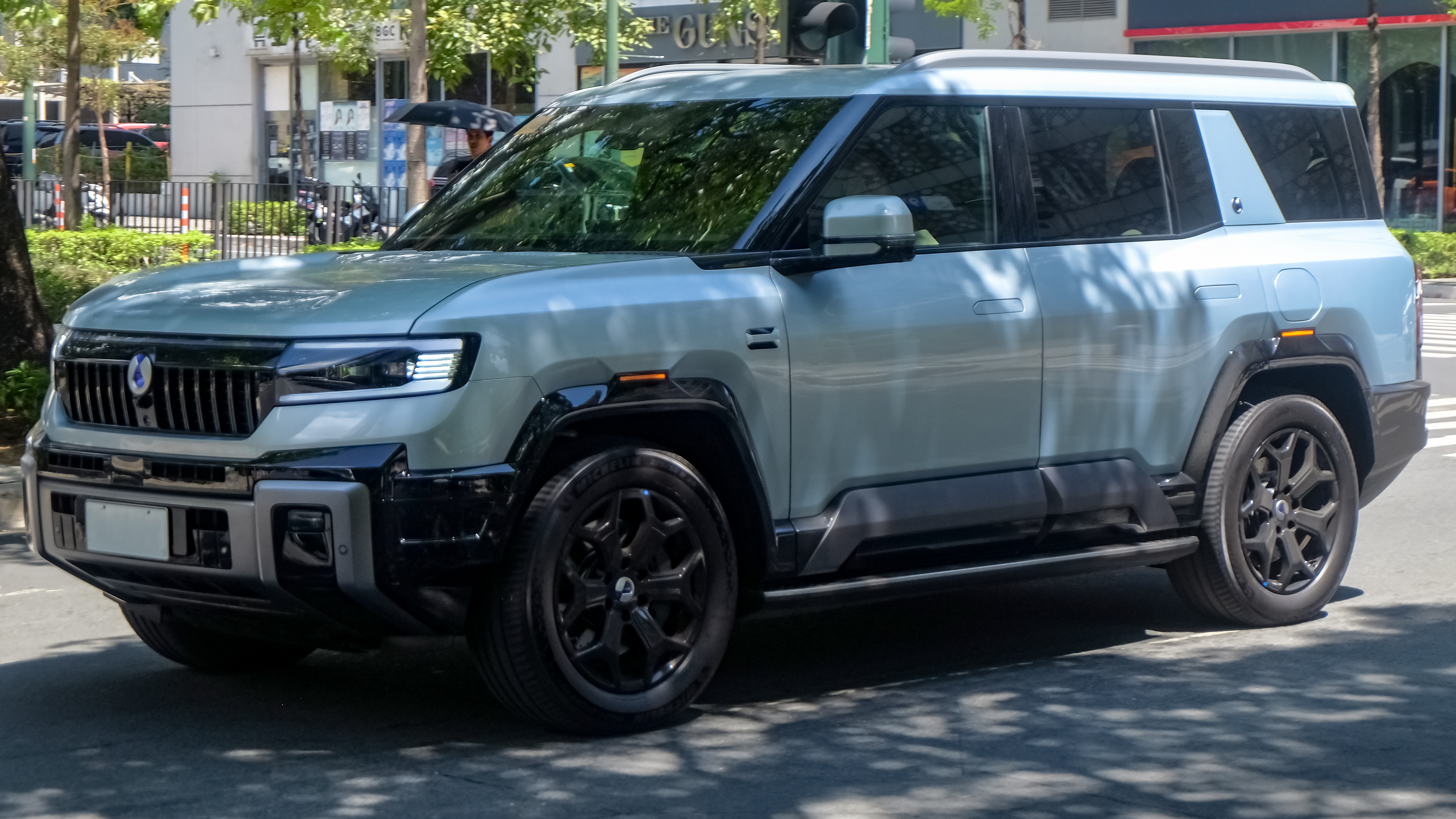
Denza B8

=== Discontinued models ===
- Denza EV/400/500 (2014–2019), compact SUV, BEV
- Denza X (2019–2021), mid-size SUV, BEV/PHEV
- Denza N7 (2023–2026), mid-size SUV, BEV
- Denza Z9 (2024–2026), full-size car, BEV/PHEV
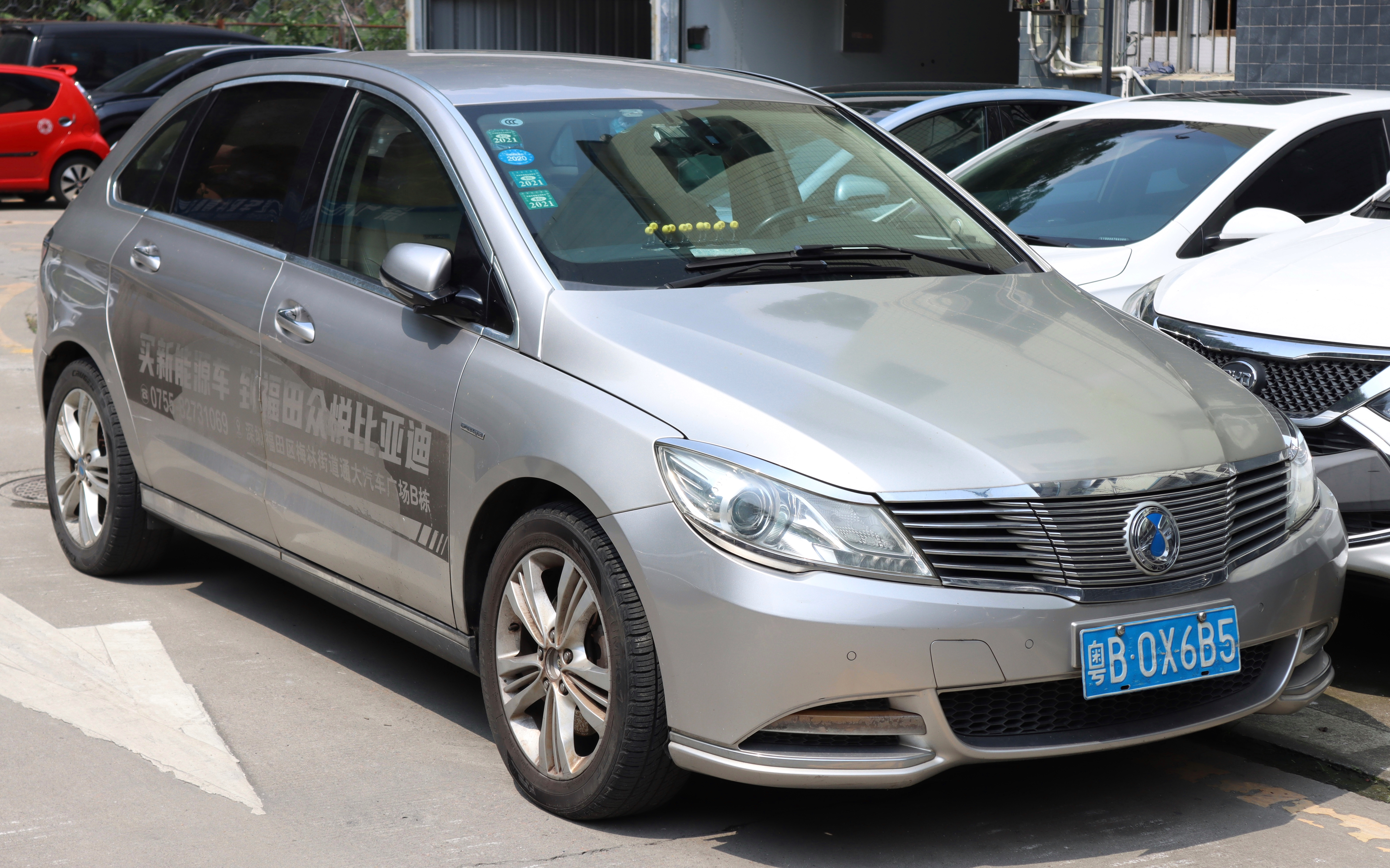
Denza EV

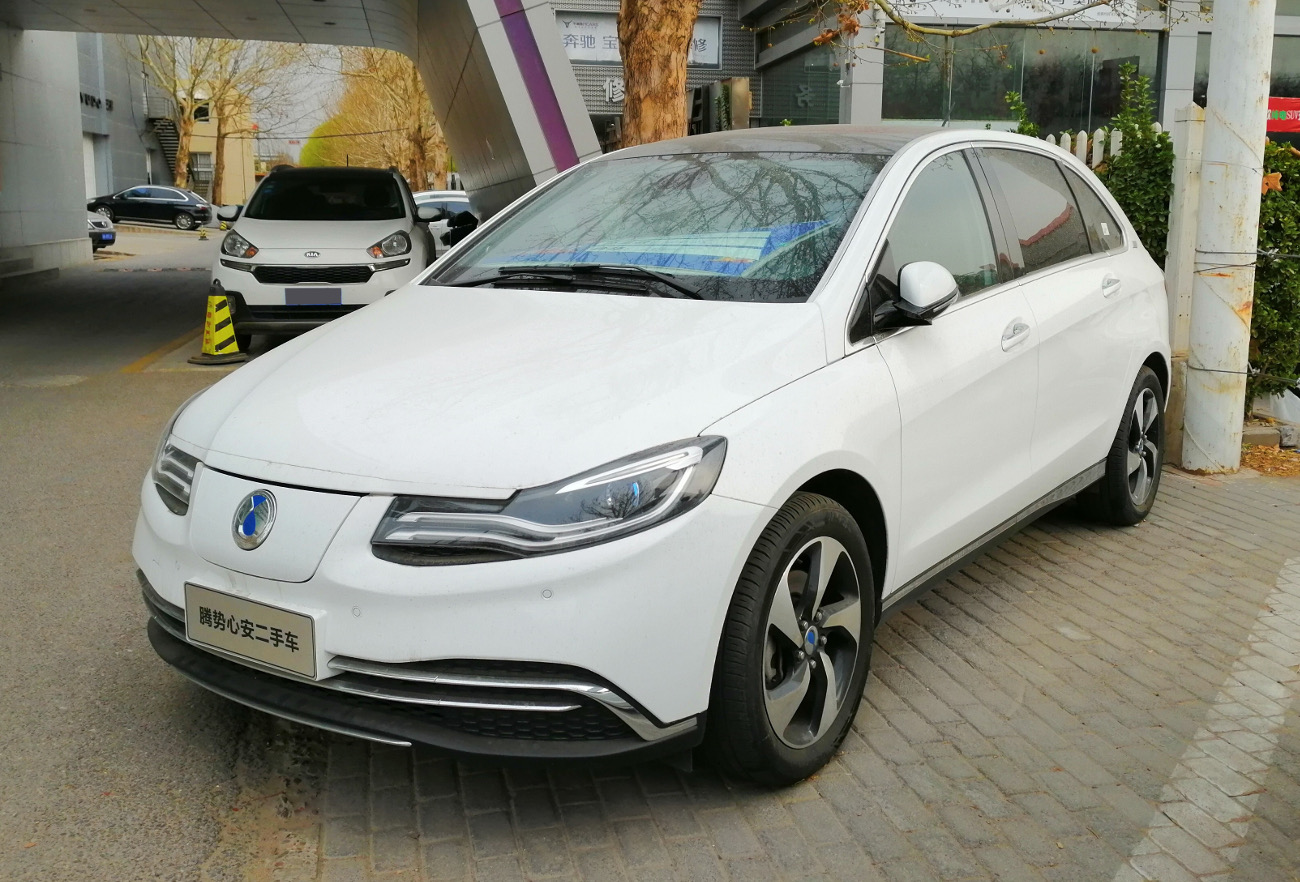
Denza 500

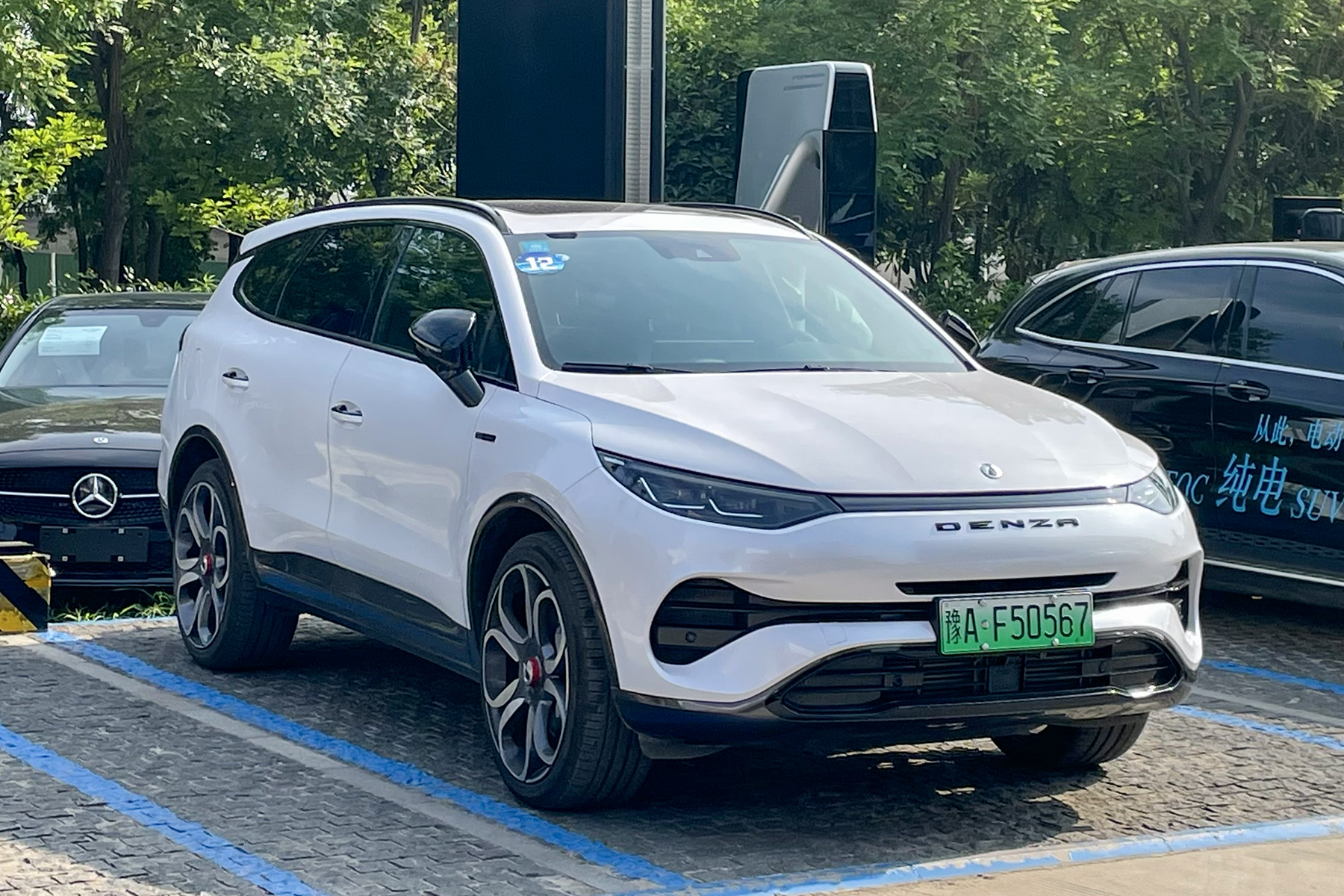
Denza X

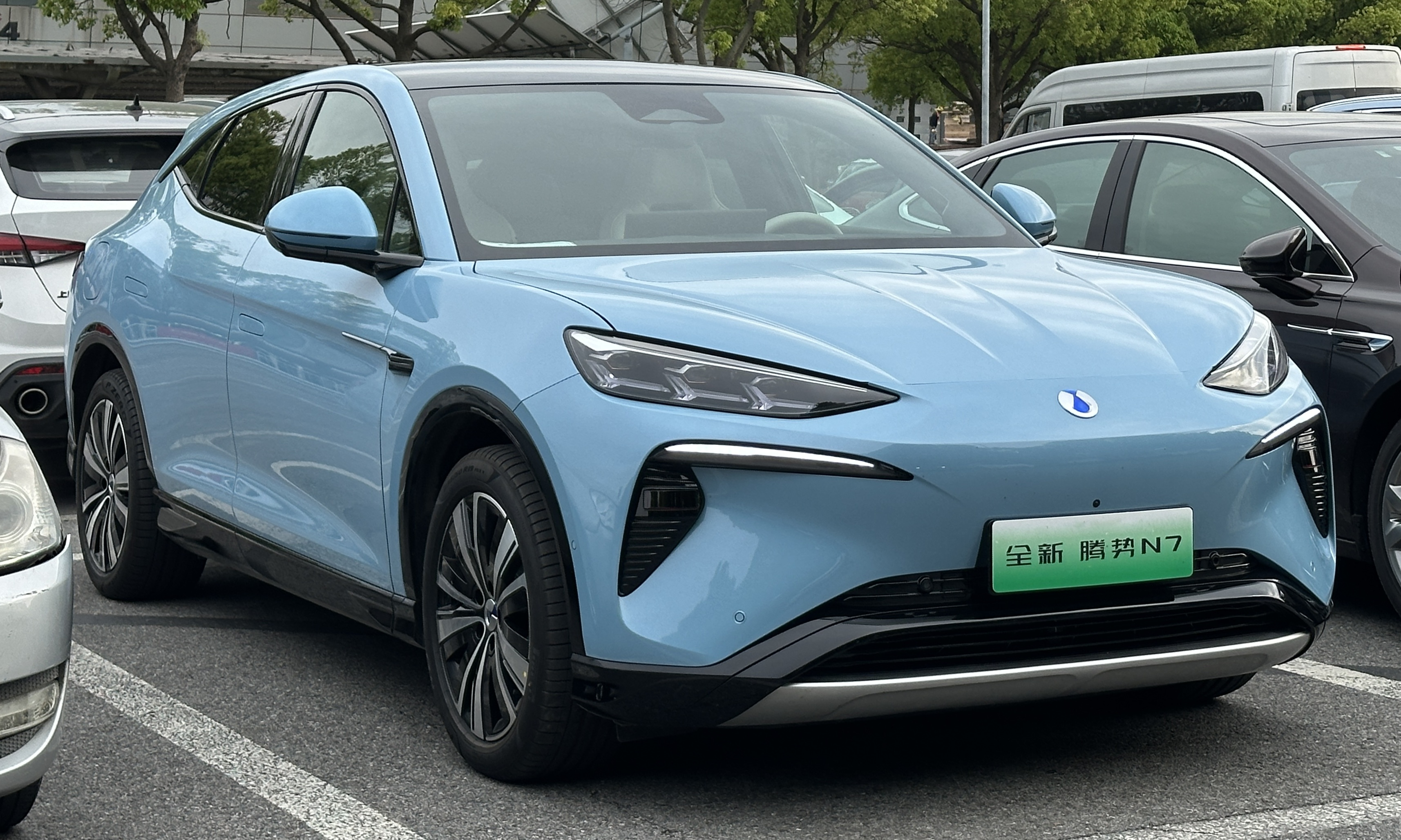
Denza N7

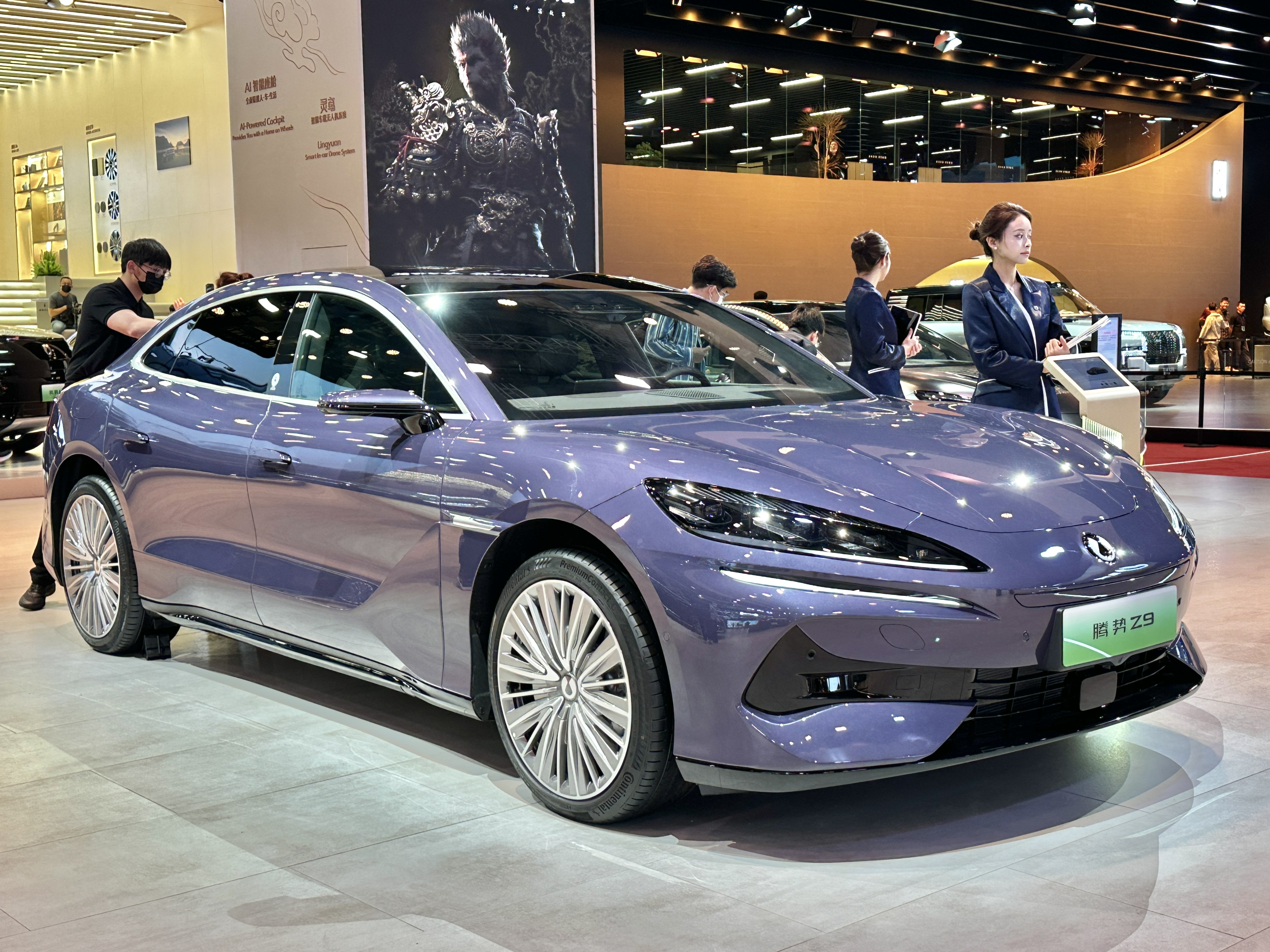
Denza Z9

=== Concept vehicles ===
- Denza EV Concept (2012)
- Denza Inception (2022)
- Denza Z Concept (2025)
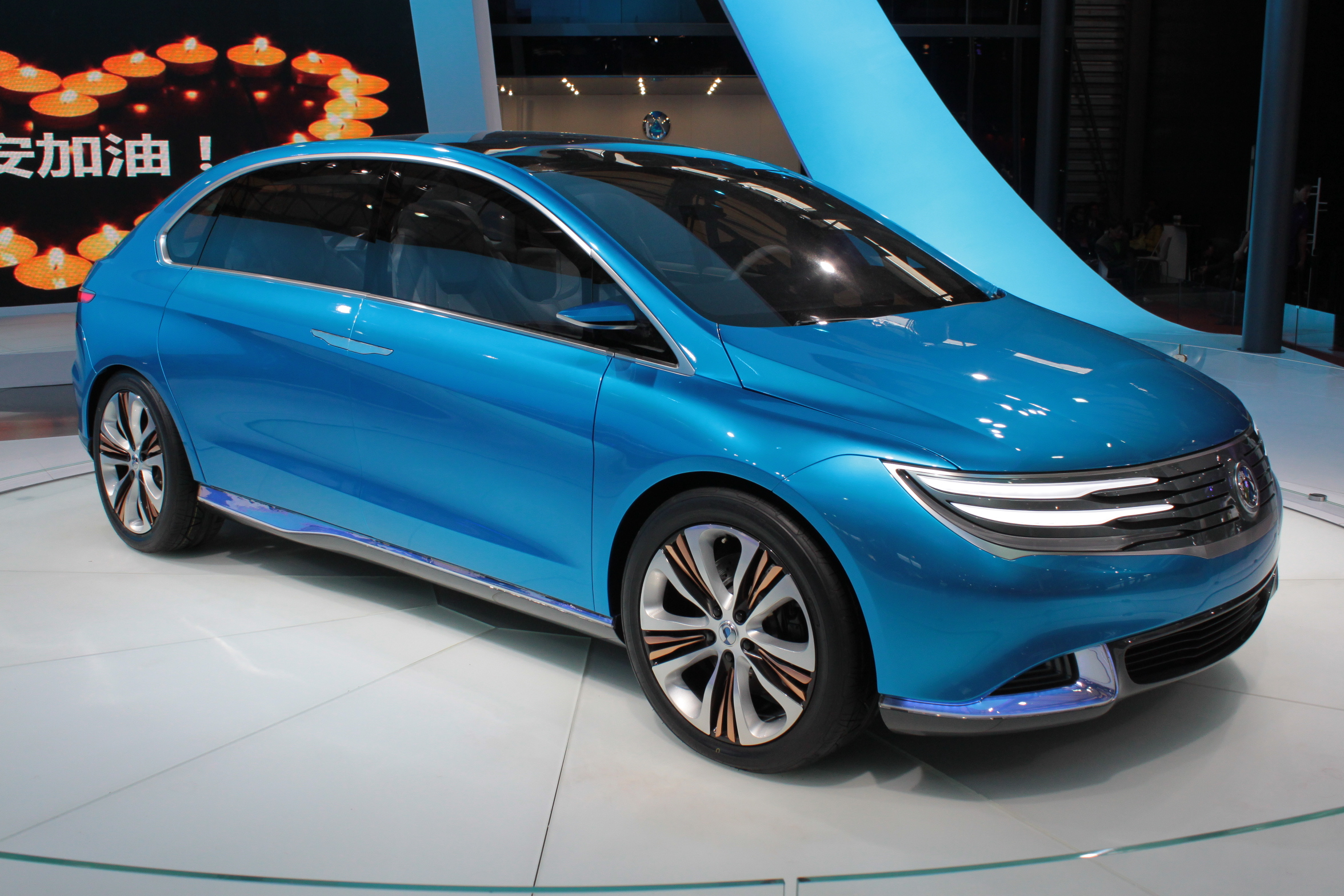
Denza EV Concept

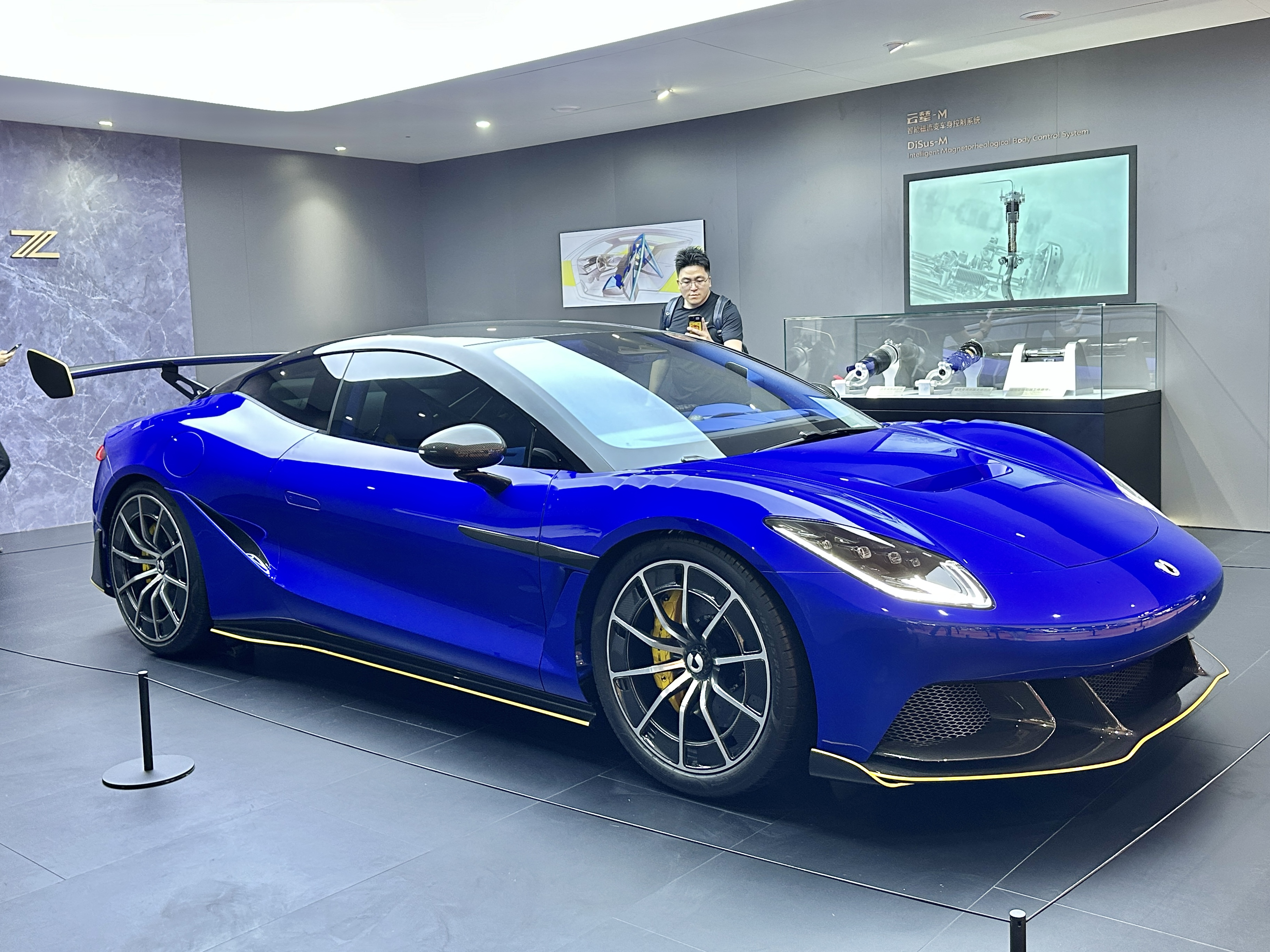
Denza Z Concept

== Trademark dispute in Indonesia ==
On 3 January 2025, Indonesian company Worcas Nusantara Abadi sued BYD for trademark infringement in Indonesia. The Denza trademark had already been registered in the country by Worcas Nusantara Abadi on 3 July 2023, predating BYD's own application, which was filed on 8 August 2024. BYD subsequently sued Worcas Nusantara Abadi over ownership of the name. The Central Jakarta Commercial Court rejected BYD's claim in April 2025, and the Supreme Court of Indonesia dismissed BYD's cassation appeal, finding that ownership of the Denza trademark had passed to another company, Raden Reza Adi. While the dispute was ongoing, BYD filed a separate application for the Danza trademark with Indonesia's Directorate General of Intellectual Property on 11 August 2025.

On 1 October 2026, BYD Motor Indonesia confirmed that Denza would be marketed as Danza going forward. The company updated its dealer signage and social media channels from "Denza Indonesia" to "Danza Indonesia" accordingly.

== Sales ==
Year	Sales
2015	2,800
2016	2,287
2017	4,713
2018	1,974
2019	2,089
2020	4,175
2021	4,708
2022	9,803
2023	127,840
2024	126,036
2025	157,134

== See also ==
- BYD Auto
- List of BYD Auto vehicles
- Yangwang
- Fangchengbao
- Linghui
- Automobile manufacturers and brands of China
- List of automobile manufacturers of China
