= Plug-in electric vehicles in China =

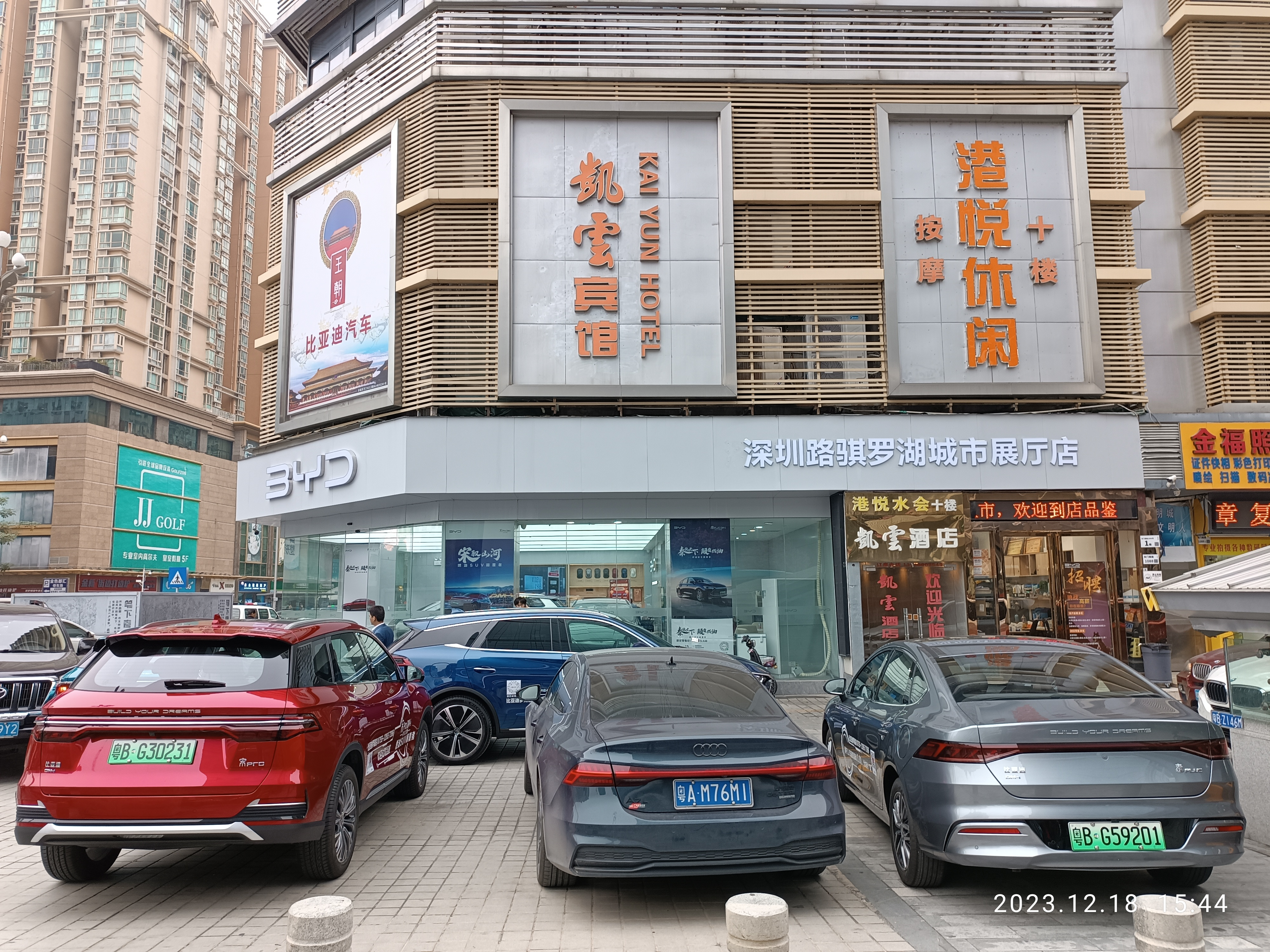
A BYD dealership in Shenzhen. BYD Auto is the all-time largest new energy vehicle manufacturer in China.

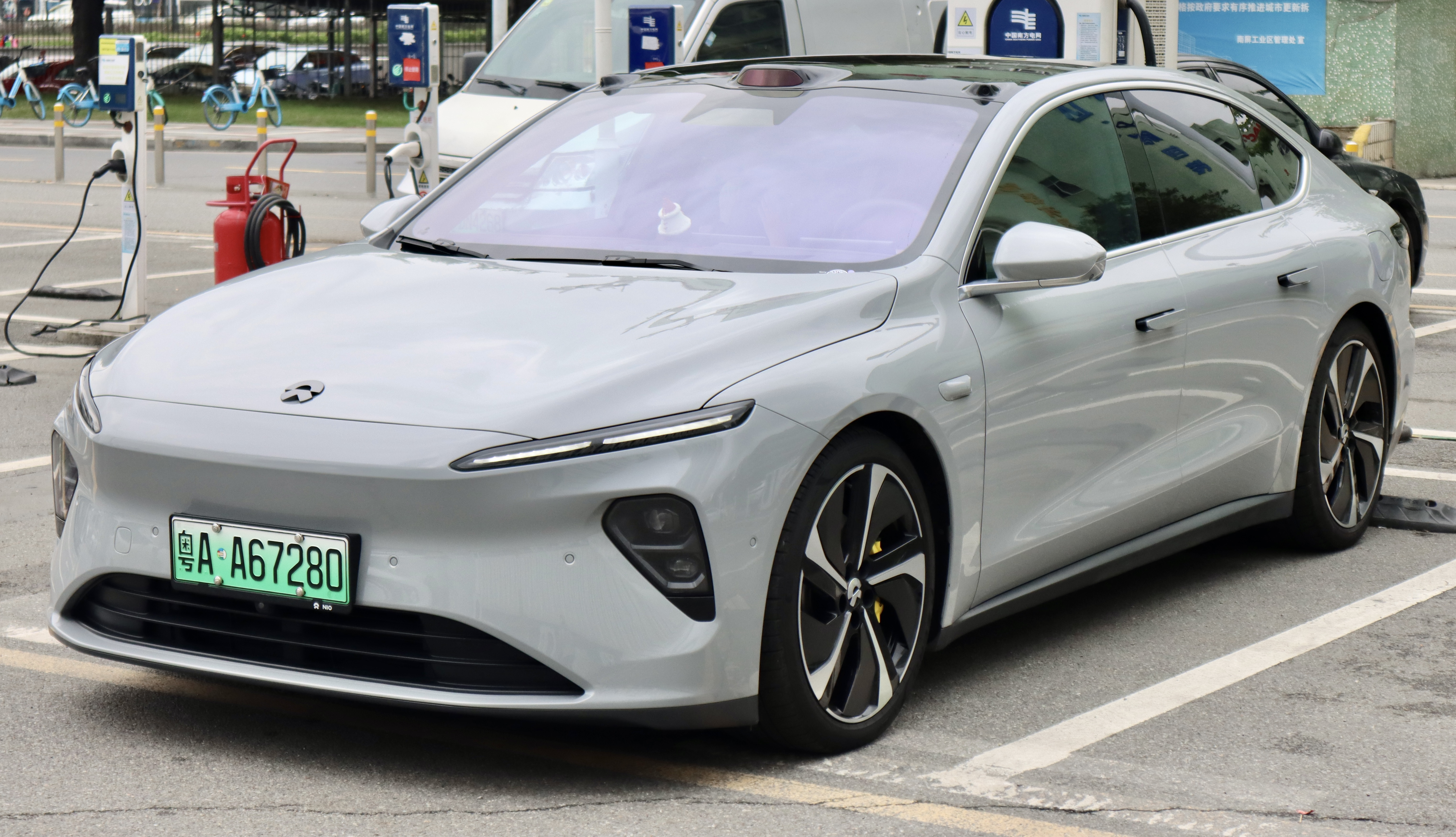
Nio ET7. Nio vehicles are equipped with battery swapping technology (TurboPower Connected).

In China, the term new energy vehicle (NEV) is used to designate automobiles that are fully or predominantly powered by electric energy, which include plug-in electric vehicles - battery electric vehicles (BEVs), and plug-in hybrid electric vehicles (PHEVs), including extended-range electric vehicles (EREVs) - and fuel cell electric vehicles (FCEV). The Chinese government began implementation of its NEV program in 2009 to foster the development and introduction of new energy vehicles, and electric car buyers are eligible for public subsidies.

The stock of new energy passenger vehicles in mainland China is the largest in the world, with 20.41 million plug-in cars in use at the end of 2023, accounting for 91% of all vehicles in circulation in China. All-electric cars account for 93% of the plug-in vehicle market. Sales in 2023 totaled 7.4 million units with a market share of 30.2% of total new car registrations, ranking as the world's largest sales volume that year.

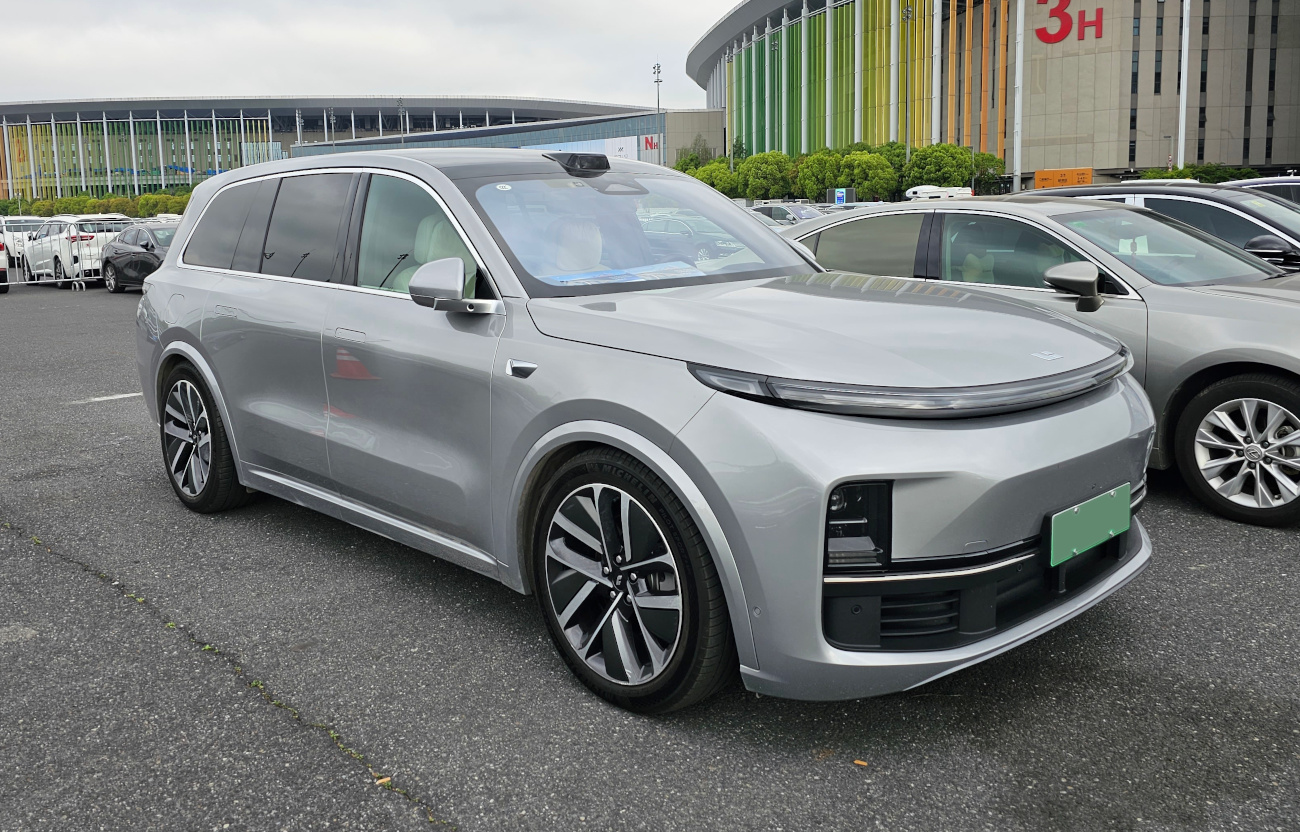
Li L9, a range-extended electric vehicle

Sales of new energy vehicles since 2011 passed the 500,000 unit milestone in March 2016, and the 1 million mark in early 2017, both excluding imports. Cumulative sales of new energy passenger cars achieved the 500,000 unit milestone in September 2016, and 1 million by the end of 2017. Domestically produced passenger cars account for 96% of new energy car sales in China.

China also dominates the plug-in light commercial vehicle and electric bus deployment, with its stock reaching over 500,000 buses in 2019, 98% of the global stock, and 247,500 electric light commercial vehicles, 65% of the global fleet. In addition, the country also leads sales of medium- and heavy duty electric trucks, with over 12,000 trucks sold, and nearly all battery electric.

China has been the world's best-selling plug-in electric passenger car market for nine years running, from 2015 to 2023, with annual sales rising from more than 207,000 plug-in passenger cars in 2015, to 579,000 in 2017, and just over 7 million units in 2023. A particular feature of the Chinese passenger plug-in market is the dominance of small entry level vehicles, in 2015 representing 87% of total pure electric car sales, while 96% of total plug-in hybrid car sales were in the compact segment.

The government's political support for the adoption of electric vehicles has four goals, to create a world-leading industry that would produce jobs and exports; energy security to reduce its oil dependence which comes from the Middle East; to reduce urban air pollution; and to reduce its carbon emissions. In June 2012 the State Council of China published a plan to develop the domestic energy-saving and new energy vehicle industry. The plan set a sales target of 500,000 new energy vehicles by 2015 and 5 million by 2020. As sales of new energy vehicles were slower than expected, in September 2013, the central government introduced a subsidy scheme providing a maximum of US$9,800 toward the purchase of an all-electric passenger vehicle and up to US$81,600 for an electric bus.

== Government policies and incentives ==
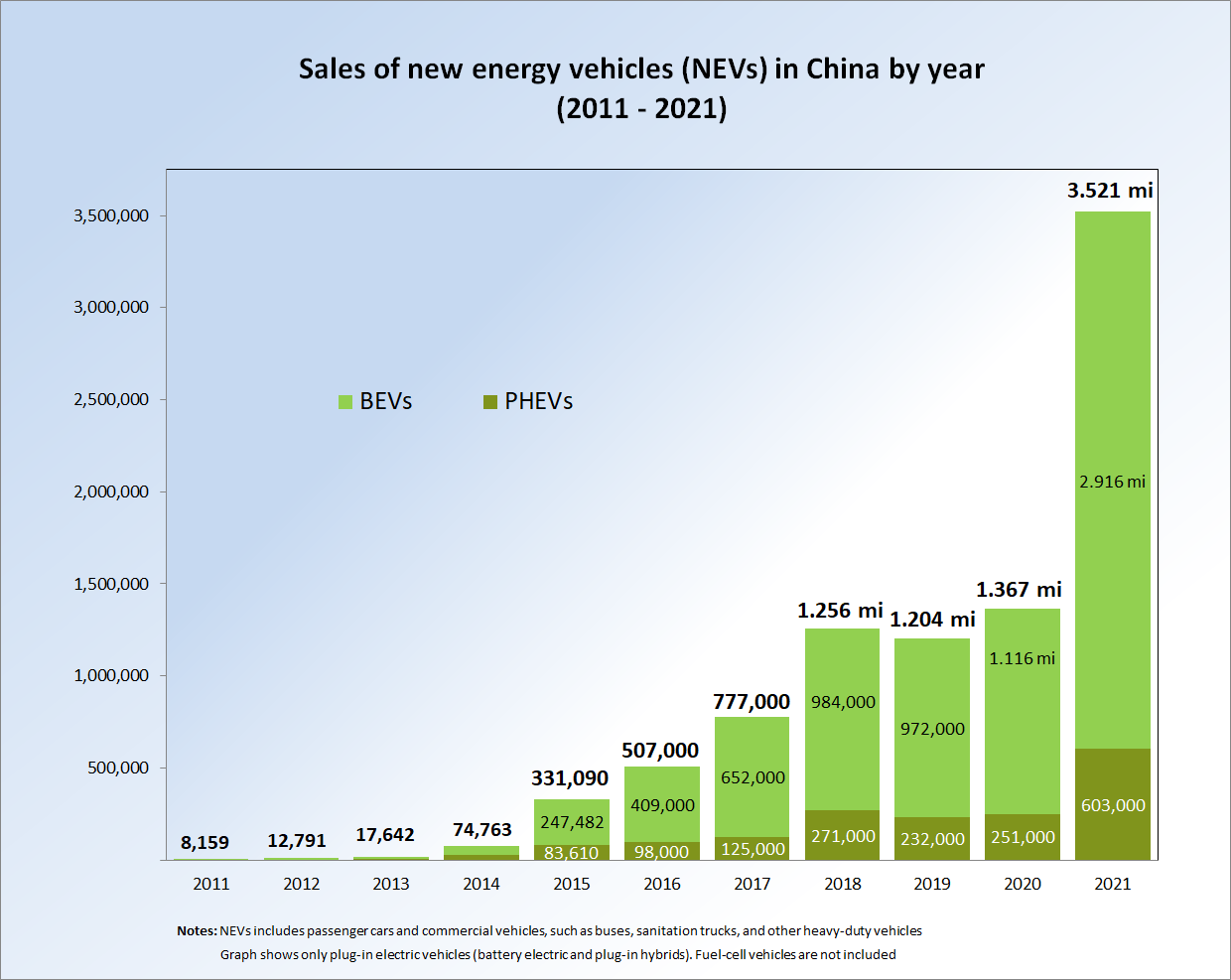
Annual sales of new energy vehicles in China between 2011 and 2021

Policy support for electric vehicles in China includes both government procurement and efforts to stimulate the private market for EVs.

The Chinese government adopted in 2009 a plan to leapfrog current automotive technology, and seize the growing new energy vehicle (NEV) market to become of the world's leaders in manufacturing of all-electric and hybrid vehicles. The government's political support for the adoption of electric vehicles has four goals, to create a world-leading industry that would produce jobs and exports; energy security to reduce its oil dependence which comes from the Middle East; to reduce urban air pollution; and to reduce its carbon emissions. However, a study by McKinsey & Company found that even though local air pollution would be reduced by replacing a gasoline car with a similar-size electric car, it would reduce greenhouse gas emissions by only 19%, as China uses coal for 75% of its electricity production. The Chinese government uses the term new energy vehicles (NEVs) to designate plug-in electric vehicles, and only pure electric vehicles and plug-in hybrid electric vehicles are subject to purchase incentives. Initially, conventional hybrids were also included.

On June 1, 2010, the Chinese government announced a trial program to provide incentives for new energy vehicles of up to 60,000 yuan (~US$9,281 in June 2011) for private purchase of new battery electric vehicles and 50,000 yuan (~US$7,634 in June 2011) for plug-in hybrids in five cities. The cities participating in the pilot program are Shanghai, Shenzhen, Hangzhou, Hefei and Changchun. The subsidies are paid directly to automakers rather than consumers, but the government expects that vehicle prices will be reduced accordingly. The amount of the subsidy will be reduced once 50,000 units are sold. Electricity utilities have been ordered to set up electric car charging stations in Beijing, Shanghai and Tianjin. The government set the goal to raise the country's annual production capacity to 500,000 plug-in hybrid or all-electric cars and buses by the end of 2011, up from 2,100 in 2008.

In June 2012, the State Council of China published a plan to develop the domestic energy-saving and new energy vehicle industry. The plan set a sales target of 500,000 new energy vehicles by 2015 and 5 million by 2020. According to a report by McKinsey & Company, electric vehicle sales between January 2009 and June 2012 represented less than 0.01% of new car sales in China. A mid-September 2013 joint announcement by the National Development and Reform Commission and finance, science, and industry ministries confirmed that the central government would provide a maximum of US$9,800 toward the purchase of an all-electric passenger vehicle and up to US$81,600 for an electric bus. The subsidies are part of the government's efforts to address China's problematic air pollution.

A 2012 survey of Chinese and U.S. consumer preferences for different vehicle types found that regardless of the national subsidies and based solely on user preferences, Chinese consumers stated being willing to adopt BEVs and mid-range PHEVs at similar rates relative to their respective gasoline counterparts, whereas American consumers stated preferring low-range PHEVs over BEVs. The study highlights an increased preference of Chinese willingness to buy BEVs when compared to the U.S., implying a potential for earlier BEV adoption in China, given adequate supply.

The China Association of Automobile Manufacturers (CAAM) expected that sales of electric and hybrid electric vehicles in China would reach 60,000 to 80,000 units in 2014. As sales have been much lower than initially expected, and most of the deployed NEV stock has been purchased by the government for public fleets, new monetary incentives were issued in 2014, and the national government set a sales target of 160,000 units for 2014. Although the goal was not achieved, new energy vehicles sales in 2014 totaled 74,763 units, up 324% from 2013. The China Industrial Association of Power Sources expected new energy vehicle sales to reach between 200,000 and 220,000 NEVs in 2015, and 400,000 units in 2016. The surge in demand continued in 2015, with a total of 331,092 NEVs sold in 2015, rising 343% year-on-year.

Initially, CAAM expected new energy vehicle sales to more than double 2015 sales and reach 700,000 NEVs in 2016. After the government imposed penalties to several carmakers for defrauding the subsidy program out of almost 10 billion yuan, CAAM revised downward in September 2016 its 2016 sales target to 400,000 new energy vehicle orders. Only 289,000 new energy vehicles had been sold during the first nine months of 2016.

As intercity driving is rare in China, electric cars provide several practical advantages because commutes are fairly short and at low speeds due to traffic congestion. These particular local conditions make the range limitation of all-electric cars less of a problem, especially as the latest Chinese models have a top speed of 100 km/h (60 mph) and a range of 200 km (120 mi) between charges. As of May 2010, Chinese automakers have developed at least 10 models of high-speed, all-electric cars with plans for volume production.

The Chinese government reaffirmed their priority to promote new energy vehicles in its 13th Five-Year Plan (2016–2020). The Central Committee of the Chinese Communist Party approved the document that emphasizes boosting technological innovations in the manufacturing of new energy vehicles and promoting the use of electric cars, plug-in hybrids and fuel cell vehicles, included in its latest Five-Year Plan. The consulting firm PwC estimates the sales of new-energy vehicles in China will climb to 1.4 million units by 2020, and about 3.75 million units by 2025.

As part of its commitment to promote electric vehicles, the Chinese government announced plans in September 2015 to build a nationwide charging-station network to fulfil the power demand of 5 million electric vehicles by 2020. This network will cover residential areas, business districts, public space and inter-city highways, according to a guideline released by the State Council. Also, the plan mandates that new residential complexes should build charging points or assign space for them, while public parking lots should have no less than 10% of parking spaces with charging facilities. According to the guideline, there should be at least one public charging station for every 2,000 NEVs. Also the State Council ordered local governments not to restrict the sales or use of new energy cars.

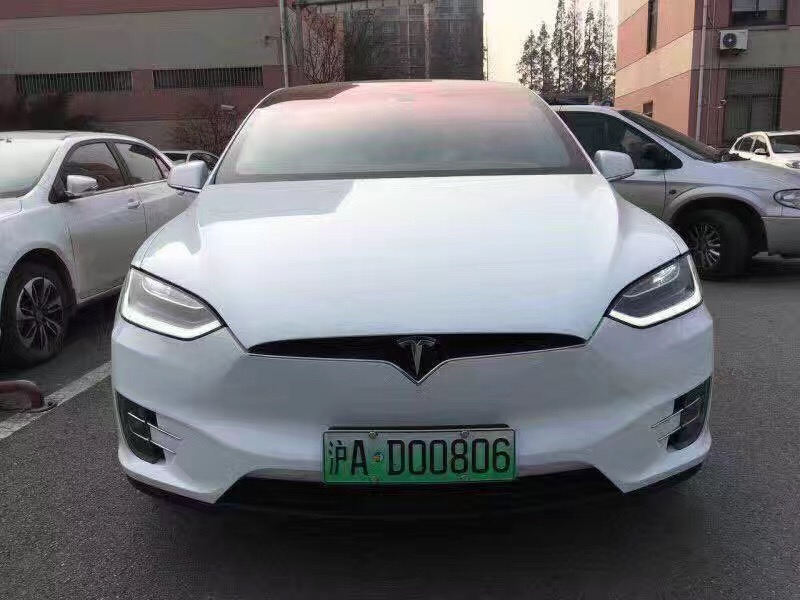
Tesla Model X with Shanghai's new green EV vehicle license plate in 2018

In October 2015, Tesla Motors announced the company is negotiating with the Chinese government on producing its electric cars domestically. Local production has the potential to reduce the sales prices of Tesla models by a third, and so improve the weak sales of the Model S. A Model S starts at about US$76,000 in the U.S., while in China pricing starts at CN¥673,000, about US$106,000, after duties and other taxes. Foreign automakers are generally required to establish a joint venture with a Chinese company to produce cars domestically.

In April 2016, the Traffic Management Bureau under the Ministry of Public Security announced the introduction of new green license plates to identify new energy vehicles, as opposed to the country's standard blue plates. The NEV plates include a Chinese character short for the provincial region where they are issued, and seven numbers and letters, compared to six on standard plates. The objective of the special plates is to facilitate police enforcement of the preferential policies that some local authorities apply to cleaner cars to help cut emissions and ease traffic. For example, central Beijing has in place a road space rationing scheme, a driving restriction regulation that bans conventional vehicles from entering the city for one day a week, but new energy vehicles are exempted from the restriction. Beijing also introduced a vehicle quota system in 2011, awarding new car licenses through a lottery, with a ceiling of 6 million units for 2017. New energy vehicles were placed in a special category where the odds of winning a license plate are much higher than conventional autos.

In 2017, China successively introduced policies related to new energy vehicles, involving infrastructure, subsidies and technology research and development. Among them, the 2017–2020 Policy Adjustment focuses on subsidies to manufacturers through distinctive improved incentive designs and enforcement measures. Measures for the Parallel Administration of the Average Fuel Consumption and New Energy Vehicle Credits of Passenger Vehicle Enterprises is an important policy in this year. This policy sets different standards for credit management methods for passenger car companies. It stipulates that companies with a production volume and import volume of more than 30,000 vehicles need to meet the credit requirements for new energy vehicles. The formulation of this policy clearly promotes the coordinated development of energy-saving and new energy vehicles, and improves the penetration rate of energy-saving technologies while reducing fuel consumption per vehicle.

In 2018, China adjusted the purchase tax rate for small-displacement passenger vehicles. The purchase tax for passenger vehicles with a displacement of 1.6 liters and below is levied at the statutory tax rate of 10%, which is 2.5% higher than last year. The purpose of the adjustment of the purchase tax rate is to limit the total number of motor vehicle registrations and promote the purchase rate of new energy vehicles. The specific regulations are implemented and managed in accordance with the Catalogue of NEV Models Exempt from Vehicle Purchase Tax. In 2018, the central and local subsidy standards and upper limits for new energy vehicles will be reduced by 20% on the basis of the current standards. Subsidies for new energy vehicles are composed of national and local subsidies. Taking Beijing as an example, pure electric vehicles are divided into three levels of subsidies according to the mileage. After the subsidy is reduced by 20% in 2018, the corresponding subsidy amount will also be reduced respectively. Plug-in hybrid and extended-range hybrid models cannot enjoy subsidies in Beijing, but can enjoy subsidies in Shanghai, Guangzhou, Hangzhou and other places.

In 2020, new measures that can help promote automobile consumption were determined at the executive meeting of the State Council. If the new energy vehicle subsidy expires at the end of this year, the purchase tax exemption policy will also be extended for 2 years. The Ministry of Finance and other departments successively issued the Notice on the Demonstration Application of Fuel Cell Vehicles, expressing further emphasis on new energy battery power technology, and at the same time proposing a new model for the development of fuel cell vehicles. In October, the New Energy Vehicle Industry Development Plan (2021–2035) was passed, clarifying the future development direction of China's new energy vehicles.

From 2021 to 2022, the purchase tax on the purchase of new energy vehicles will be exempted. New energy vehicles exempt from purchase tax include pure electric vehicles, plug-in hybrid vehicles and fuel cell vehicles. The four ministries issued the requirements of The Notice on Improving the Financial Subsidy Policy for the Promotion and Application of New Energy Vehicles on December 31, 2021. This requirement stipulates the new energy vehicle subsidy standard in 2022.

In 2022, subsidies for new energy vehicles will be reduced by 30% from the previous year. For passenger service vehicles, such as buses, taxis, sanitation vehicles, express vehicles, and new energy vehicles such as official vehicles of party and government agencies that meet the requirements, the subsidy standard will be reduced by 20%. Compared with 2021, there will be no major changes in the subsidy technical indicators in 2022, and the changes will focus on the subsidy rate. The subsidy program will end on December 31, 2022, which means that 2022 will be the last year for the implementation of the new energy subsidy policy.

In order to better support the development of new energy vehicles, relevant departments have issued relevant policies on the exemption of vehicle purchase tax for new energy vehicles, extending the expiration of new energy vehicles at the end of 2022 to the end of 2023. Vehicles are uniformly managed by the Catalogue of NEV Models Exempt from Vehicle Purchase Tax issued by the State Administration of Taxation and other state agencies. From January 1, 2023, as long as the pure electric type, plug-in hybrid type and fuel cell type vehicles included in the "Catalogue" are eligible for tax exemption. Although the purchase tax of new energy vehicles will be abolished in 2023, the vehicle's tax payment certificate will still be required when the vehicle is licensed.

Between 2009 and 2022, China spent 200 billion yuan (US$28 billion) on EV subsidies and tax breaks. China ended the max. 12,600 yuan direct subsidy for BEV customers in 2022. Until the end of 2025, tax exemption is a maximum of 30,000 yuan, reducing to a maximum of 15,000 yuan until the end of 2027.

== Main new energy vehicle companies in China ==
A number of enterprises have emerged in China's new energy vehicle industry, including BYD, Tesla, NIO, Li Auto, and XPeng. Traditional automakers such as GAC Aion, Geely Auto, SAIC Group, and Great Wall Motors have also entered the new energy vehicle market. Additionally, emerging brands such as Leapmotor and technology companies such as Huawei and Xiaomi have entered the market.

== New energy vehicle sales ==
Cumulative light-duty plug-in electric vehicle sales in China compared to the world's top-selling countries and Europe as of December 2021. China has the world's largest stock of plug-in passenger cars.

Cumulative domestically built new energy vehicle sales in China totaled 1,728,447 units between January 2011 and December 2017. These figures include heavy-duty commercial vehicles such buses and sanitation trucks, and only accounts for vehicles manufactured in the country because imports are not subject to government subsidies. As of December 2017, the Chinese stock of plug-in electric vehicles consisted of 1,385,088 all-electric vehicles (80.1%) and 343,359 plug-in hybrid vehicles (19.9%) sold since 2011. Most of the stock of new energy vehicles was sold during the last three years. Deliveries between 2015 and 2017 account for 93.4% of all domestically built new energy vehicle sales since 2011, of which, 45.0% were sold in 2017, 29.3% in 2016, and 19.2% in 2015.

According to the Minister of Science and Technology, by mid-2013 more than 80% of the country's plug-in stock was on duty in public fleet vehicles, used mainly in public transport, for both bus and taxi services, and also in solid waste recollection services (sanitation trucks). As of December 2014, a total of 83,198 plug-in electric passenger cars and 36,500 pure electric buses had been registered in the country since 2008. A particular feature of the Chinese passenger plug-in market is the dominance of small entry level vehicles. In 2015, all-electric car sales in the mini and small segments (A-segment) represented 87% of total pure electric car sales, while 96% of total plug-in hybrid car sales were in the compact segment (C-segment). Among the electric drive segments, mid-size car (D-segment) sales were significant only in the conventional hybrid segment, representing about 50% of hybrid sales.

The country achieved record sales of 207,380 new energy passenger cars in 2015, making China the world's top selling plug-in passenger car country market in calendar year 2015, surpassing the European market and also the United States, the leading market in 2014. A total of 320,081 new energy passenger cars were sold in 2016, ahead of both Europe (212,000) and the U.S. (157,181), allowing the country to remain as the world's top selling plug-in car market in 2016. The domestic plug-in segment market share totaled 1.3% of new car sales in 2016. These sales figures exclude imports, such as the Tesla Model S. Domestically produced cars account for 96% of new energy car sales in China.

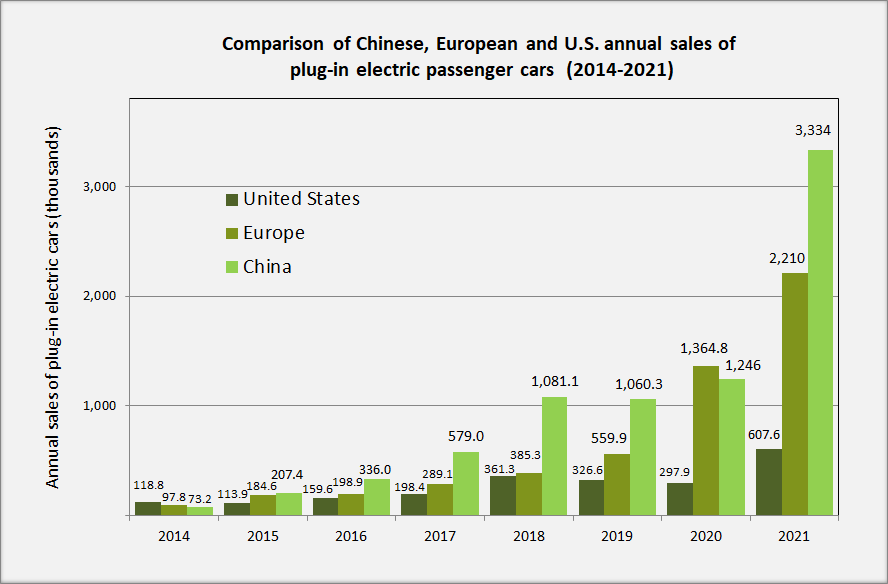
Comparison of annual plug-in electric passenger car sales between China, Europe, and the U.S. (2014 - 2021)

China, together with the U.S., had the world's largest country stock of plug-in electric passenger cars until September 2016, with the Chinese plug-in stock representing 29.2% of the global stock of highway legal plug-in electric passenger cars. In October 2016, with about 31,000 plug-in passenger cars sold in China, while U.S. sales totaled over 11,000 units, China became the country with the world's largest stock of plug-in passenger cars, totaling about 553,000 units versus almost 533,000 in the American market. The gap between the two countries widened in November 2016, as 41,795 new energy passenger cars were sold in China, while only 14,124 were sold in the U.S. By November 2016, China's cumulative total plug-in passenger vehicles sales also overtook Europe, making the country the global leader in the light-duty plug-in vehicle segment. As of December 2016, sales of domestically produced new energy passenger cars since 2010 totaled 632,371 units. IHS Automotive predicted Chinese annual plug-in car sales will reach 1 million in 2019, four years before the United States. Chinese car buyers may also be more likely to adopt BEVs. A controlled survey experiment of car buyers in China and the U.S. suggest that U.S. consumer's willingness to buy a BEV is $10,000-$20,000 lower than an otherwise similar gasoline vehicle, whereas Chinese consumers' willingness to buy is within $10,000.

As of December 2015, China was listed as the world's leader in the plug-in heavy-duty segment, including electric buses and plug-in trucks, the latter, particularly sanitation/garbage trucks. Over 160,000 heavy-duty new energy vehicles have been sold between 2011 and 2015, of which, 123,710 (77.2%) were sold in 2015. Sales of commercial new energy vehicles in 2015 consisted of 100,763 all-electric vehicles (81.5%) and 22,947 plug-in hybrid vehicles (18.5%).

In terms of the penetration rate of new energy vehicles, according to the China Association of Automobile Manufacturers, the penetration rate of new energy vehicles in China reached 40.9% in 2024; According to the forecast of China Electric Vehicle 100, the penetration rate of new energy vehicles in China will reach about 55% in 2025.

=== Electric buses ===
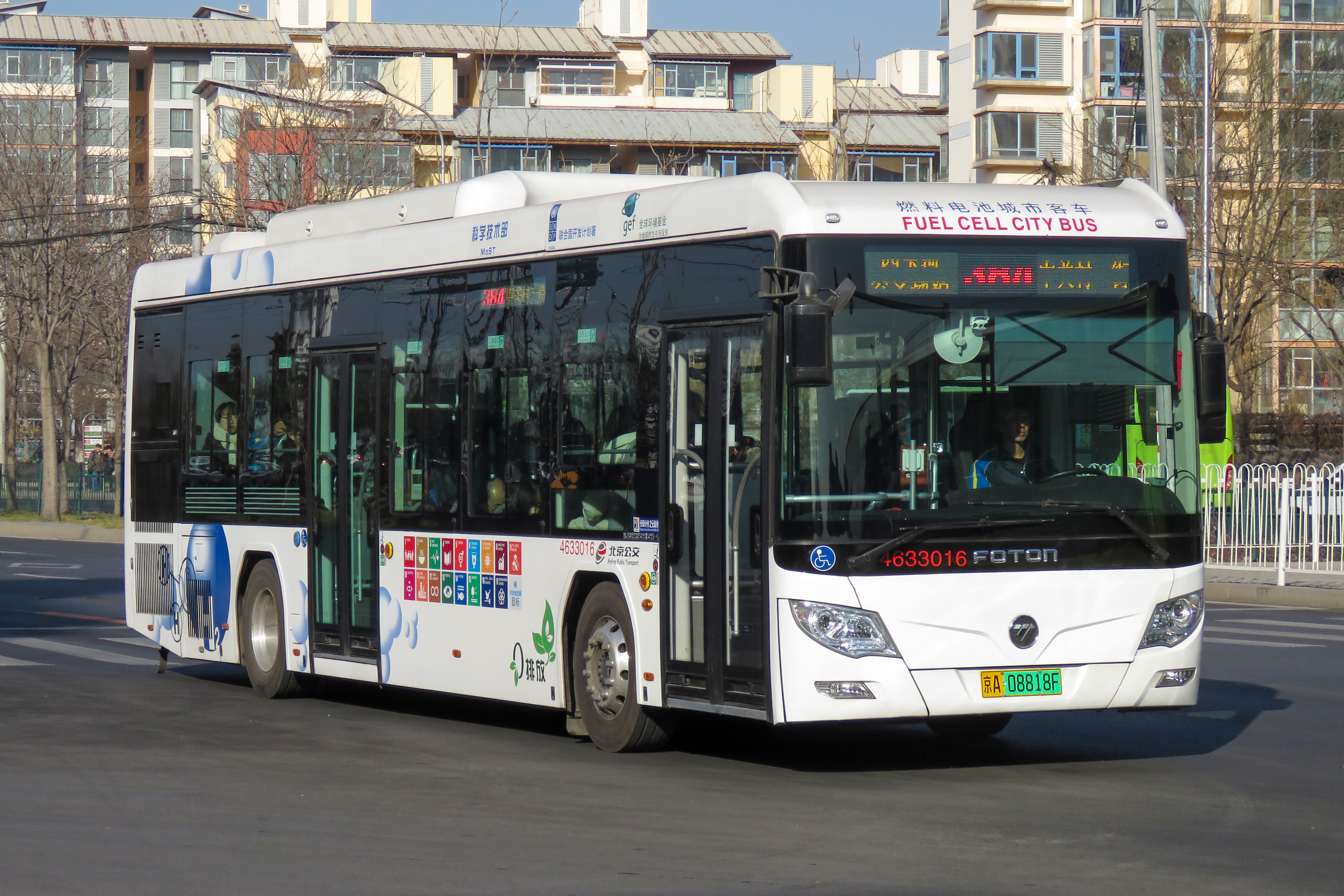
Foton Motor hydrogen fuel cell bus in Beijing.

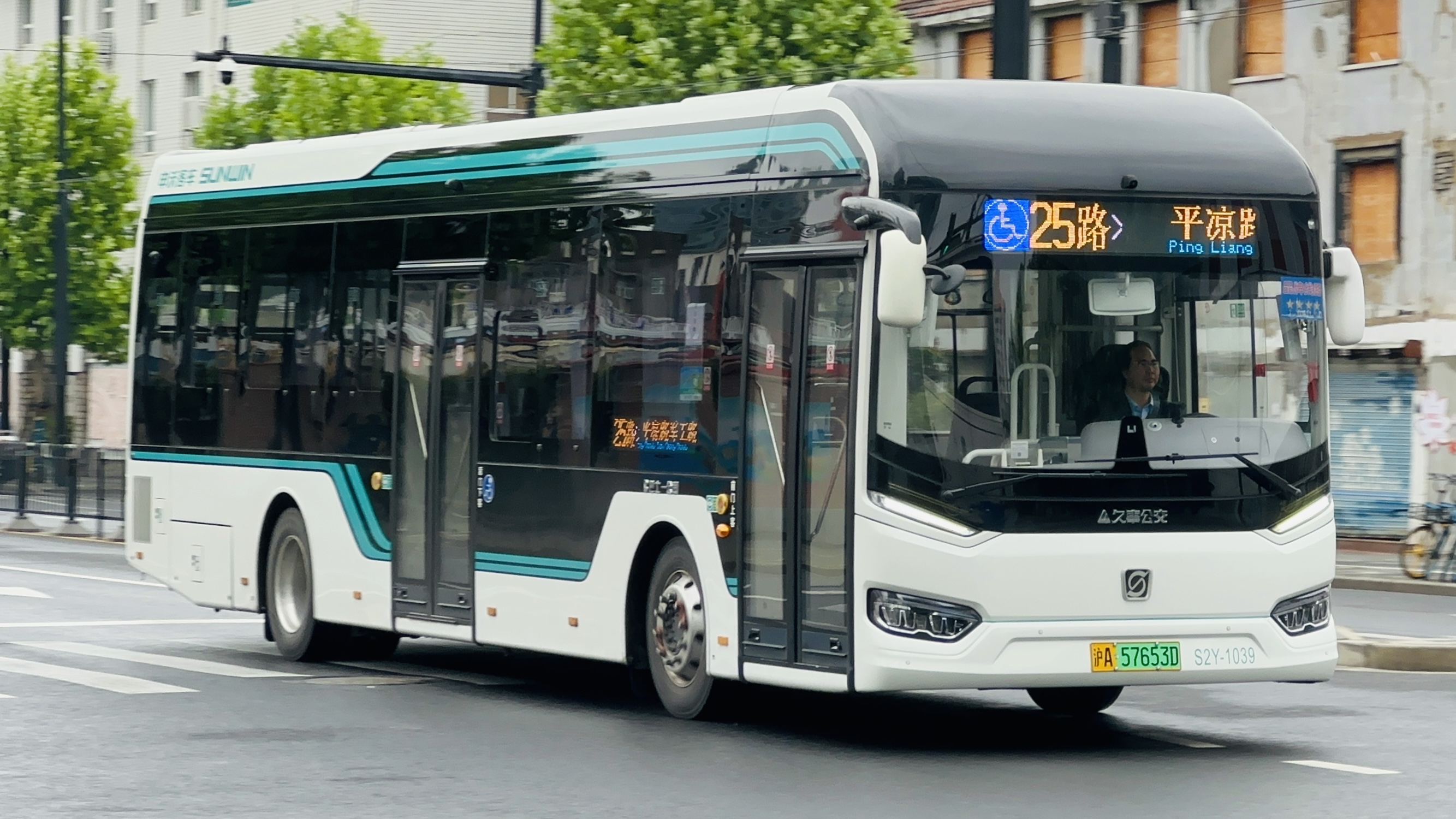
Sunwin battery-electric bus in Shanghai

The share of all-electric bus sales in the Chinese bus market climbed from 2% in 2010 to 9.9% in 2012, and was expected to be closed to 20% for 2013. The global stock of plug-in battery electric bus in 2015 was estimated to be about 173,000 units, but almost entirely deployed in China, the world's largest electric bus market. Of these, almost 150,000 are all-electric buses. The Chinese electric bus stock grew nearly six-fold between 2014 and 2015. The production of all-electric buses totaled 115,664 units in 2016, up 31% from 88,248 electric buses produced in 2015.

The Chinese stock of plug-in buses reached 343,500 units in 2016, doubling the 2015 stock, with 300,000 units being all-electric vehicles. The global stock of electric buses was about 345,000 vehicles in 2016, with only 1,273 deployed in Europe and 200 in the U.S. The city of Shenzhen is leading the modernization and electrification effort in China with hundreds of electric buses already in operation in 2016. Shenzhen set the goal of having a 100% electric bus fleet in 2017. China had about 385,000 electric buses by the end of 2017, more than 99% of the global stock. China also produces Hydrogen fuel cell buses, with over 8,000 in service. These were used during the Beijing 2022 Winter Olympics, as batteries perform poorly in cold temperatures. From January to August 2022, China sold 23,366 electric buses, representing 90.7% of total buses sales in China. In 2022, around 54,000 new electric buses were sold in China, representing 18% total electric buses sales in China and about 80% of global sales. In addition, many of the buses being sold in Latin America, North America and Europe are Chinese brands. Meaning that the electric buses built by China is now being sold almost worldwide. And by early 2023, China has over 670,000 buses with over 51% of those being electric buses. The numbers of electric buses have been growing for the past few years. The impacts of electric buses are not only limited in local places. Overseas, China provided around 900 electric buses for 2022 FIFA World Cup in Qatar, produced by Chinese manufacturer Yutong. Yutong's electric buses, which have a range of more than 200 kilometers on one charge, account for one-fourth of the buses running in the country during the event.

The Chinese electric bus market continues to grow in 2023 and 2024. In 2024, Chinese manufacturers exported a total of 15,444 new energy buses, a year-on-year increase of 28.3%. Among them, BYD ranked first with 3,582 exports, Yutong and Higer ranked second and third respectively. China's electric bus market shows positive growth in 2023 and 2024, reflecting the increasing global demand for clean transportation solutions.

=== Low-speed vehicles and other modes ===
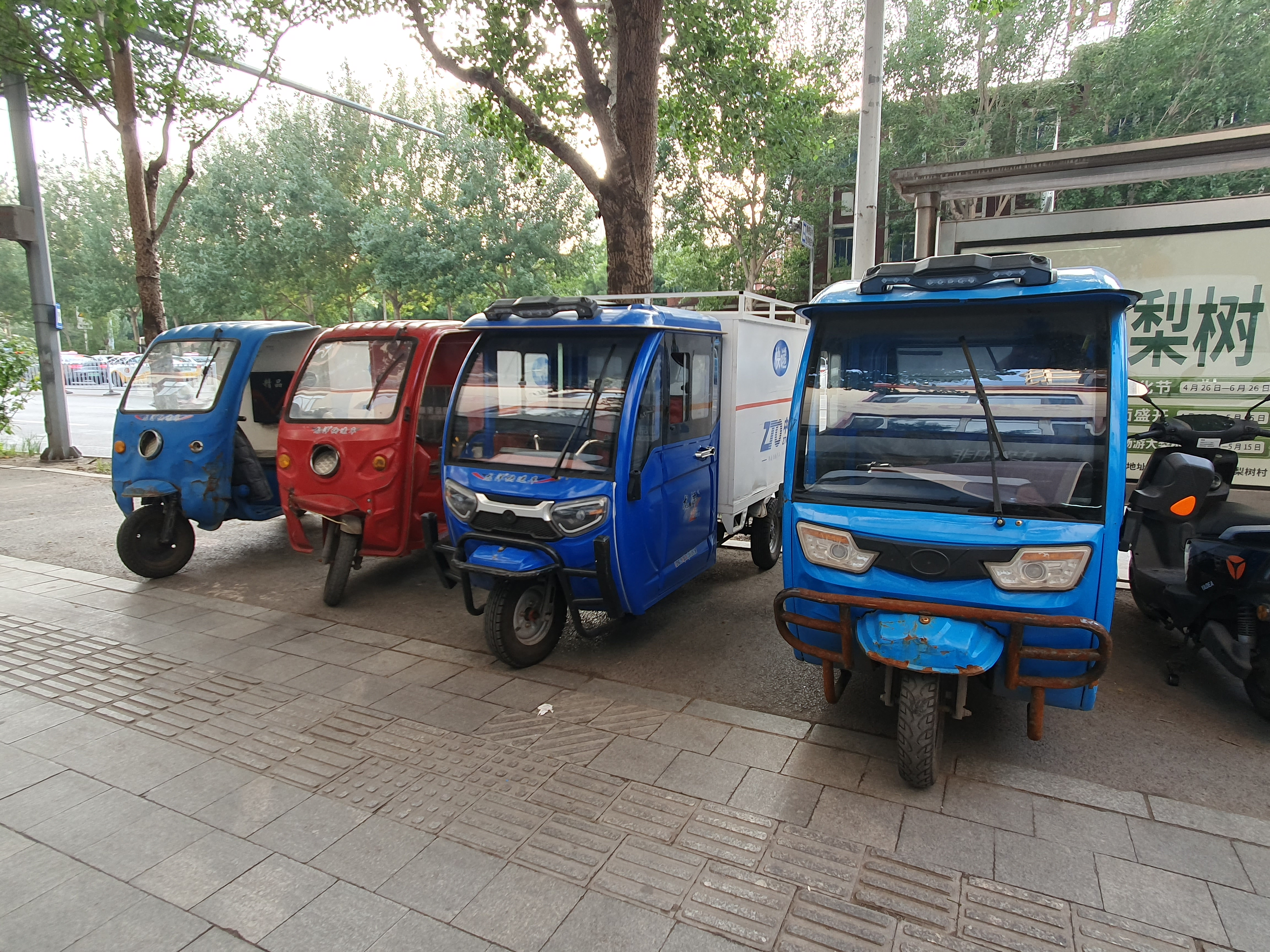
Three-wheeler low-speed electric vehicles for package deliveries

==== Low-speed electric vehicles ====
Sales of low-speed electric vehicles (LSEVs) experienced considerable growth in China between 2012 and 2016 due to their affordability and flexibility because they can be driven without a driver license. Most of these low-speed electric cars are used in small cities, but they are expanding to larger cities. These small vehicles are not accounted by the government as new energy vehicles (NEVs) due to safety and environmental concerns, and are excluded from government NEV purchase subsidies. LSEVs generally have a maximum speed of between 40 and 70 km/h (25 and 43 mph), have short ranges and, in some cases, use lead-acid batteries and basic motor technology.

About 200,000 low-speed small electric cars were sold in 2013, and 750,000 units in 2015. LSEV sales in 2016 were estimated at 1.2 million, while highway capable plug-in passenger cars were over 300,000. As of December 2016, the stock low-speed small electric car was estimated to be between 3 million and 4 million units. However the sales ratio between LSEVs and passenger NEVs began to decrease beginning in 2015. In 2014, LSEVs sales were 15 times more than normal plug-in passenger cars, but the ratio declined to about four times in 2016, and fell to 2.5 times in 2018, when about 1.1 million normal passenger electric vehicles, compared to 1.4 million low-speed vehicles.

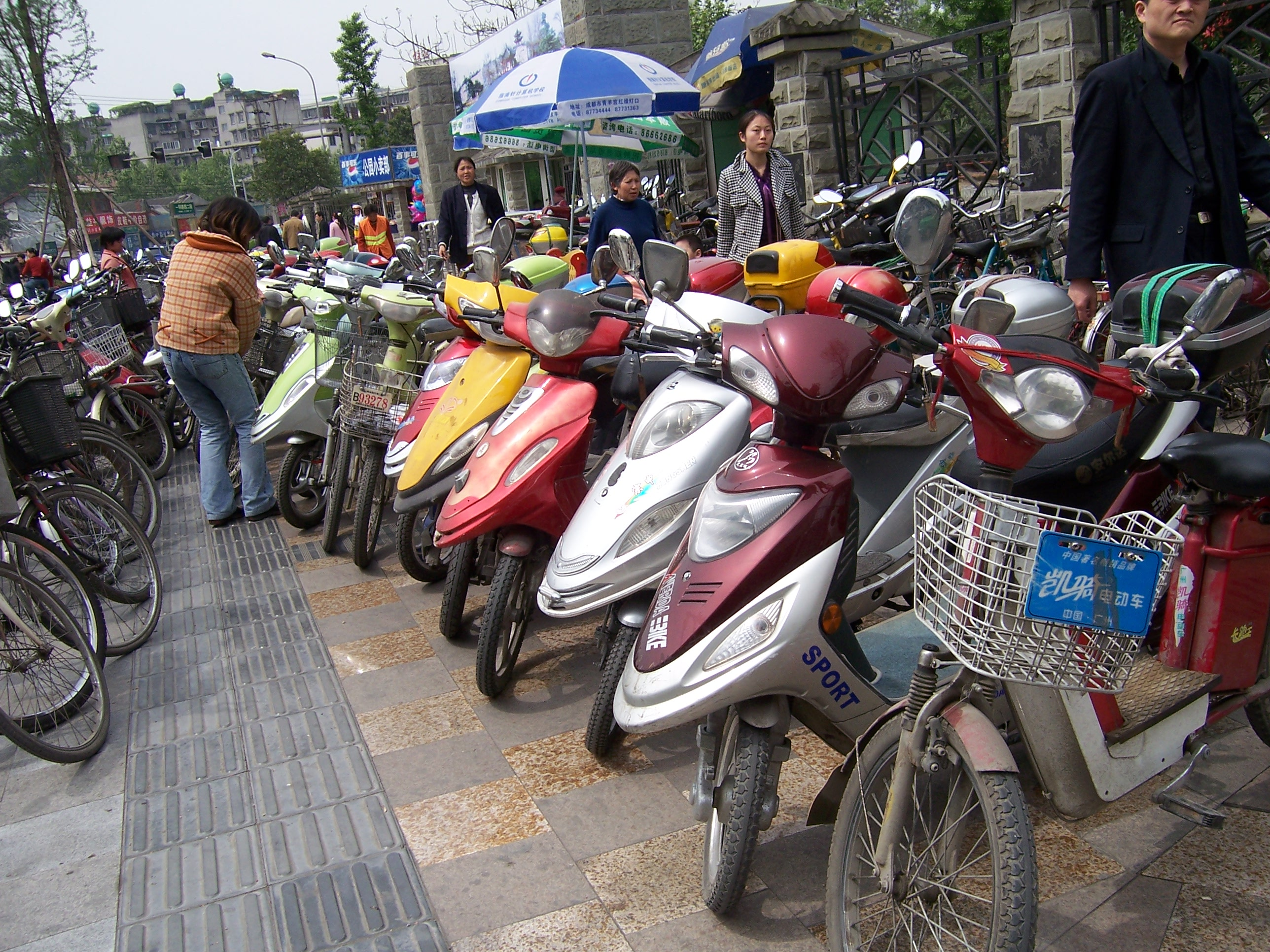
Electric scooters in Chengdu

The lack of regulations for LSEV manufacturers has led to poor safety performance. Traffic safety is also at stake. LSEVs struggle in large cities due to their poor acceleration and low top speeds. LSEVs could jeopardize the market for electric cars, one of China's priorities for industrial policy development. For these reasons, legislation to regulate and standardize low-speed electric vehicles began to be discussed by the Chinese government in 2016, including battery types (lead-acid versus lithium-ion batteries) and mandatory safety tests and vehicle dimensions.

==== Two-wheelers and three-wheelers ====
China continued to dominate both new registrations and the global stock of electric two-wheelers in 2016, with about 26 million units sold. The stock of electric two-wheelers is estimated in the 200-230 million range by the end of 2016, making China the global leader in this segment.

The high growth rate in electric two-wheelers is partially due to the country's policies to limit air pollution hazards, such as its ban on gasoline-powered motorcycles, limits on the issuing of licences, and the division of lanes. In addition, two-wheelers have reached cost parity with internal combustion engine models, making them affordable and attractive to consumers.

From 2017 to 2021, the sale of electric two-wheelers has gone from 30 million to almost 50 million, around 75.9% of global total. The estimated sales in 2023 was around 54 million. Throughout the years, the demand for battery duration and intelligent functions have increased, under new policies and demands, the newly designed and upgraded electric two-wheelers will have lighter body weight. In addition, electric two-wheelers will also be installed with new technologies like auto lock, seat sensor, phone app connection and battery monitor. The goal is to meet the entertainment and functional needs of the consumers. With the increase of electric two-wheelers, the policy has become more complete, from helmet to charging regulations, the electric two-wheeler in China is now forming a stable system.

In 2023, the total sales volume of electric two-wheelers in China was about 54.7 million. In 2024, the total domestic sales volume of electric two-wheelers in China was about 49.5 million, a year-on-year decline of 11.6%. In 2024, the total sales volume of electric two-wheelers in China in the overseas market reached 18.77 million, a year-on-year increase of 24.8%. The main reason for the decline in domestic sales in China in 2024 is the saturation of the market and the continued intensification of competition in the industry.

=== National market ===
Cumulative sales of new energy vehicles in China between 2011 and 2021

==== 2011–2013 ====
A total of 8,159 new energy vehicles were sold in China during 2011, including passenger cars (61%) and buses (28%). Of these, 5,579 units were all-electric vehicles and 2,580 plug-in hybrids. Electric vehicle sales represented 0.04% of total new car sales in 2011. Sales of new energy vehicles in 2012 reached 12,791 units, which includes 11,375 all-electric vehicles and 1,416 plug-in hybrids. New energy vehicle sales in 2012 represented 0.07% of the country's total new car sales. During 2013 new energy vehicle sales totaled 17,642 units, up 37.9% from 2012 and representing 0.08% of the nearly 22 million new car sold in the country in 2013. Deliveries included 14,604 pure electric vehicles and 3,038 plug-in hybrids.

The top selling new energy car in China between 2011 and 2013 was the Chery QQ3 EV city car, with 2,167 units sold in 2011, 3,129 in 2012, and 5,727 in 2013. The JAC J3 EV ranked second in 2012 with 2,485 units sold, followed by the BYD e6 with 1,690 cars. During 2013, the BYD e6 ranked second with 1,544 units sold, followed by the BAIC E150 EV with 1,466 units. The BYD Qin plug-in hybrid was launched in the country in December 2013. The Qin replaced the BYD F3DM, the world's first mass-produced plug-in hybrid automobile, launched in China in December 2008.

==== 2014 ====
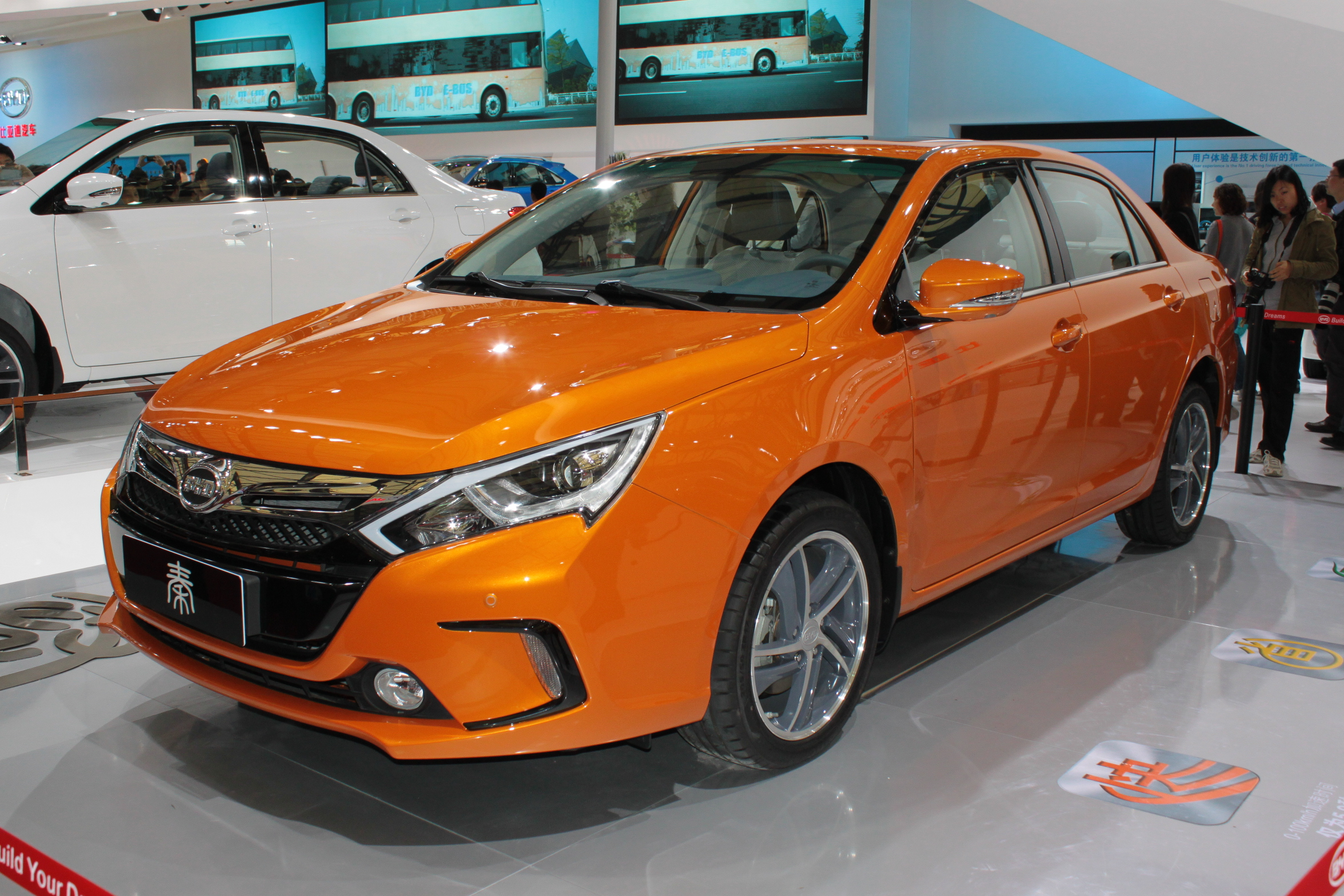
The BYD Qin plug-in hybrid is the all-time top selling passenger new energy vehicle in China since 2014, with cumulative sales of over 49,500 units up to March 2016.

In April 2014, Dongfeng Nissan announced that retail sales of the Chinese manufactured version of the Nissan Leaf, the Venucia e30, were scheduled to begin in September 2014. The Venucia e30 sold 582 units in 2014.

The first Tesla Model S retail deliveries took place in Beijing on 22 April 2014. About 2,800 Model S sedans have been imported by mid September 2014, but only 432 had received the license plates. According to a Tesla spokesman, the major reasons for the discrepancy could be that registration rules were holding deliveries in Shanghai, and Tesla only recently was able to start delivering the electric cars to customers who bought them in Shanghai. Secondly, many Chinese customers have delayed taking possession of their Model S car while waiting for the government to add the Tesla to the list of electric vehicles exempt from its 8% to 10% purchase tax. As of January 2015, a total of 2,968 Model S cars have been registered in China.

New energy vehicle sales in China during 2014 totaled 74,763 units, consisting of 45,048 all-electric vehicles, and 29,715 plug-in hybrids. Of these, 71% were passenger cars, 27% buses, and 1% trucks. Pure electric vehicle sales increased 210% from 2013 while plug-in hybrid sales grew 880% from the previous year. Production of new energy vehicles in the country in 2014 reached 78,499 units, up 350% from 2013. The plug-in electric segment market share reached 0.32% of the 23.5 million new car sales sold in 2014. The BYD Qin ranked as the top selling plug-in electric car in China in 2014, with 14,747 units sold during the year, and became the country's top selling plug-in passenger car ever. The Qin was followed by the all-electrics Kandi EV with 14,398, Zotye Zhidou E20, with 7,341 units, and BAIC E150 EV with 5,234.

==== 2015 ====
Domestically produced new energy vehicle sales in 2015 totaled a record 331,092 units, consisting of 247,482 all-electric vehicles and 83,610 plug-in hybrid vehicles, up 449% and 191% from 2014, respectively. Sales of plug-in passenger cars, excluding imports, totaled 207,380 units in 2015, consisting of 146,720 all-electrics and 60,660 plug-in hybrids. This record level of sales allowed China to rank as the world's best-selling plug-in electric car country market in 2015, ahead of the U.S., which was the top selling country in 2014. The plug-in electric passenger car segment market share rose to 0.84% in 2015, up from 0.25% in 2014. The top selling plug-in passenger models in 2015 were the BYD Qin plug-in hybrid with 31,898 units sold, followed by the BYD Tang (18,375), and the all-electrics Kandi EV (16,736), BAIC E150/160/200 EV (16,488), and the Zotye Z100 EV (15,467).

As of December 2015, with 31,898 units sold in 2015, the BYD Qin continued to rank as the all-time top selling plug-in passenger car in the country, with cumulative sales of 46,787 units since its introduction. The BYD Qin was the world's second best selling plug-in hybrid car in 2015, and also ranked fifth among the world's top selling plug-in electric cars in 2015. BYD Auto ended 2015 as the world's best selling manufacturer of highway legal light-duty plug-in electric vehicles, with 61,772 units sold in China, followed by Tesla Motors, with global sales of 50,580 units in 2015. Accounting for heavy-duty vehicles, BYD total sales rises to 69,222 units. BYD Auto net profits jumped 552.6% in 2015 to a total of CN¥2.829 billion (~ US$450 million). Sales of new energy vehicles were the main driver for BYD's huge profit growth, with alternative energy vehicles accounting for half of the company's profits while the same percentage in 2014 was just 27%.

==== 2016 ====
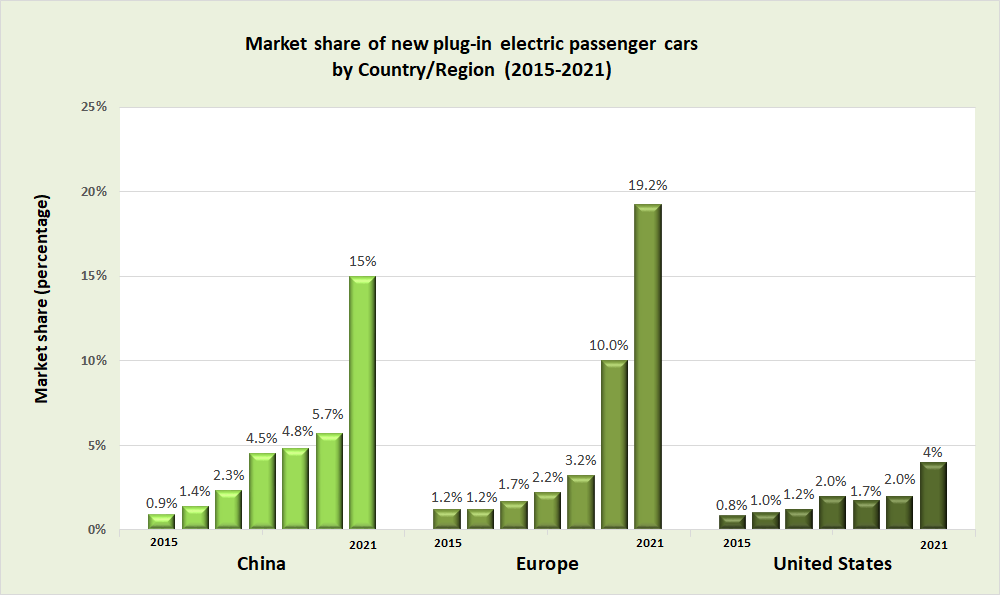
Market share of new plug-in electric passenger cars in China, Europe and the United States between 2015 and 2021

The stock of new energy vehicles sold in China since 2011 passed the 500,000 unit milestone in March 2016, including heavy-duty commercial vehicles such as buses and sanitation trucks, and making the country the world's leader in the plug-in heavy-duty segment. This figure only includes vehicles manufactured in the country as imports are not subject to government subsidies.

A total of about 507,000 new energy vehicles were sold in 2016, up 51.3% year-on-year, consisting of 409,000 pure electric vehicles, up 65.2% year-on-year, and 98,000 plug-in hybrid vehicles, up 17.2% from the same period the previous year. Sales growth through September was lower than expected due to the government's inquiry about extensive fraud cases (include: Fictitious new energy vehicle production and sales business ; Apply for a motor vehicle license for vehicles that have not yet been completed in advance and apply for Chinese central government subsidy funds.) regarding subsidies granted to manufacturers in 2015. As a result of this inquiry, the government withheld the release of the electric bus subsidy scheme. CAAM considered that without this subsidy, the goal of 500,000 new energy vehicle sales for 2016 would not be met.

Cumulative sales of plug-in passenger cars achieved the 500,000 unit milestone in September 2016. Imported plug-in cars, such as Tesla Model S or BMW i3s are not included. A total of 320,081 new energy passenger cars were sold in 2016, ahead of both Europe (212,000) and the U.S. (157,181). The domestic plug-in segment market share totaled 1.3% of new car sales in 2016. Sales of BMW plug-in hybrid and i3 electric cars in China totaled 1,796 units during the first nine months of 2016. Tesla Inc. sales totaled 10,399 vehicles in 2016, consisting of 6,334 Model S cars and 4,065 Model X SUVs. In November 2016, with cumulative sales of about 600,000 plug-in electric passenger cars, China had overtaken both Europe and the U.S., and became the market with the world's largest stock of light-duty plug-in vehicles.

Three BYD Auto models topped the Chinese ranking of best-selling new energy passenger cars in 2016. The BYD Tang plug-in hybrid SUV was the top selling plug-in car with 31,405 units delivered, followed by the BYD Qin (21,868), BYD e6 (20,605), BAIC E-Series EV (18,814), and the SAIC Roewe e550 (18,805). As of December 2016, the BYD Qin, with 68,655 units sold since its inception, remained the all-time top selling plug-in electric car in the country. A lot of the sales of the BYD and Roewe electric vehicles were contributed by rental fleets to run on ride share app giant Didi.

In September 2016, BYD Auto surpassed Mitsubishi Motors as the third largest global plug-in car manufacturer with cumulative sales of 161,000 plug-in cars delivered in China since 2008, ranking behind Tesla Motors (164,000) and the Renault-Nissan Alliance (almost 369,000). In October 2016, BYD passed Tesla Motors to become the world's all-time second largest plug-in electric passenger car manufacturer with more than 171,000 units delivered in China since 2008. BYD Auto was the world's top selling plug-in car manufacturer for a second year in a row with more than 100,000 units delivered in China in 2016, up 64% from 2015, and ahead of Tesla by about 30,000 units. However, in terms of sales revenue, Tesla ranked ahead with US$6.35 billion from its electric car sales in 2016, while BYD sales totaled US$3.88 billion from its electric car division. Cumulative sales of domestically built new energy vehicles in China totaled 951,447 units between January 2011 and December 2016.

==== 2017 ====
Chinese sales of domestically built new energy vehicles in 2017 totaled 777,000 units, up 53% from 2016 consisting of 652,000 all-electric vehicles (up 59.4%) and 125,000 plug-in hybrid vehicles (up 27.6%). Sales of domestically produced new energy passenger vehicles totaled 579,000 units, consisting of 468,000 all-electric cars and 111,000 plug-in hybrids. Accounting for foreign brands, plug-in car sales rise to about 600,000 in 2017, representing about half of global plug-in car sales in 2017. The plug-in segment achieved a record market share of 2.1% of new car sales. Cumulative sales of domestically built new energy passenger cars totaled over 1.2 million units between 2011 and 2017. Cumulative sales of domestically built new energy vehicles in China totaled 1,728,447 units between 2011 and 2017.

The BAIC EC-Series all-electric city car was the Chinese top selling plug-in car in 2017 with 78,079 units sold, making the city car the world's top selling plug-in car in 2017. The top selling plug-in hybrid was the BYD Song PHEV with 30,920 units. BYD Auto was the top selling Chinese car manufacturer in 2017. In 2017, General Motors sold about 11,000 Baojun E100s, 1,600 Buick Velite 5's and about 2,000 Cadillac CT6 plug-ins.

==== 2018 ====
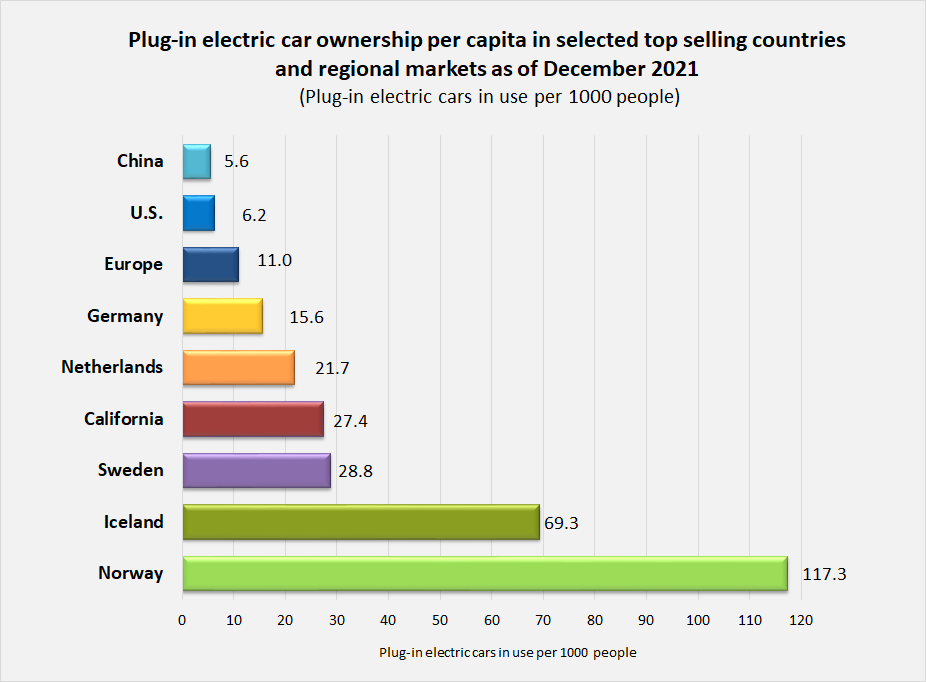
Comparison of Chinese ownership of plug-in passenger cars in use per 1,000 people with other top selling plug-in markets at the end of 2021

Sales of new energy vehicles, including commercial vehicles, totaled 1.256 million units in 2018, becoming the first time that annual sales pass the one million mark in any country. Sales of plug-in passenger cars totaled 1,016,002 units, and the plug-in passenger segment achieved a record market share of 4.2%, up from 2.1% in 2018. For the second year running, the BAIC EC-Series was the best selling plug-in car in China with 90,637 units delivered.

According to research carried out by Sina Corp, out of 886,000 plug-in passenger vehicles sold in China during the first 11 months of 2018, 201,000 units (22.6%) were delivered by the Chinese automakers to carsharing and vehicle for hire companies, with the rest to retail customers.

At the end of 2018, the Chinese stock of new energy vehicles continued to be the world's largest, and totaled 2,984,447 units including heavy-duty commercial vehicles. About 80% of the total NEV stock are all-electric vehicles. As of December 2018, cumulative sales of domestically produced highway legal plug-in electric passenger cars totaled 2,243,772 units since 2009.

==== 2020 ====
The Tesla Model 3 was China's top selling new energy passenger car, with 139,925 units delivered. With less than a year in the market, the Hongguang Mini (micro electric vehicles produced by China's SAIC-GM-Wuling Automobile Co., Ltd., designed for urban travel and are popular in the market for compact body, low price and practical range), with 119,255 units sold, was China's and the world's second best selling plug-in car after the Tesla Model 3.

There were 4.9 million new energy vehicles at the end of 2020, accounting for 1.75% of all vehicles in Chinese roads, of which, 4 million are all-electric vehicles (81.3%). China accounts for 60% of the world's electric vehicle charging stations.

==== 2021 ====
New energy vehicles sales in 2021 totaled 3.521 million in 2021, consisting of 3.334 million passenger cars and 186,000 commercial vehicles. As of December 2021, the stock of highway legal plug-in cars totaled 7.84 million units, corresponding to about 46% of the global plug-in car fleet in use. Of these, all-electric cars accounted for 81.6% of the all new energy passenger cars in circulation. Plug-in passenger cars represent 2.6% of all cars on Chinese roads at the end of 2021.

==== 2022 ====
China produced 7.058 million new energy vehicle with a sale of 6.886 million in 2022, with 1.588 million plug-in vehicle and about 4,000 fuel cell electric vehicle. BYD Auto leads China's electric vehicle sales market in 2022, with a total annual sales volume of 1.8635 million vehicles, of which the DM hybrid (plug-in) electric vehicle accumulated a total annual sales volume of 946,200. China's annual sales of electric cars were impressive, but their growth was stagnant at the end of the year due to the impact of the pandemic.

2023

In 2023, China's new energy vehicle production and sales reached 9.587 million and 9.495 million respectively, up 35.8% and 37.9% year-on-year, with a market share of 31.6%. China's new energy vehicle production and sales account for more than 60% of the world's total, ranking first in the world for nine consecutive years.

2024

In 2024, China's new energy vehicle production and sales reached 12.888 million and 12.866 million respectively, up 34.4% and 35.5% year-on-year respectively. And new energy vehicle sales reached 40.9% of the total new vehicle sales, an increase of 9.3 percentage points from 2023. Among them, pure electric vehicle sales account for 60% of new energy vehicles, a decrease of 10.4 percentage points from 2023; plug-in hybrid vehicle sales account for 40% of new energy vehicles, an increase of 10.4 percentage points from 2023.[

After the Chinese New Year holiday in 2024, the price war in China's auto market continued to expand. BYD launched a new model, proposed the concept of "electricity is cheaper than oil", and reduced the price of new energy vehicles to less than 80,000 yuan. Many other manufacturers followed the low prices set by BYD, either launching new entry-level models with lower prices or lowering prices.

Luxury car brands such as Mercedes-Benz and BMW also lowered their profile and began to cut prices for promotions in China market. In July, BMW announced that it would be the first to withdraw from the price war in the Chinese auto market and reduce preferential policies. Mercedes-Benz, Audi and others followed suit.

=== Regional and city markets ===
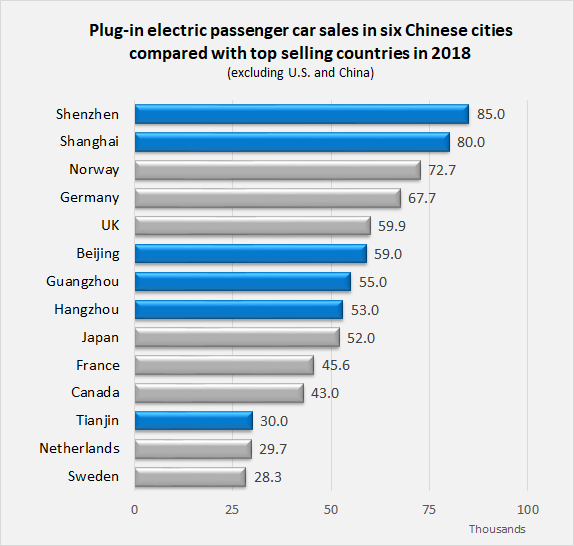
Plug-in electric car sales in six Chinese cities compared to the world's top selling countries in 2018 (excluding China and the U.S.)

As of December 2017, 25 cities, including their broader surrounding metropolitan areas, accounted for 44% of the world's stock of plug-in electric cars, while representing just 12% of world passenger vehicle sales. Shanghai led the world with cumulative sales of over 162,000 electric vehicles since 2011, followed by Beijing with 147,000 and Los Angeles with 143,000. Ranking next, with a stock of more than 50,000 electric vehicles are Shenzhen, Oslo, Hangzhou, San Francisco, Tianjin, Tokyo, San Jose, California, and Qingdao. Shanghai, Beijing, Shenzhen, Hangzhou, and Tianjin have market shares ranging from 9% to 13%.

As of 2018, six Chinese cities have in place major restrictions on internal combustion vehicle purchases: Shenzhen, Shanghai, Beijing, Guangzhou, Hangzhou, and Tianjin. The local incentives and restrictions are different in each city, in the case of Shanghai most of the plug-in stock consist of plug-in hybrid vehicles, while in Beijing the stock is almost entirely all-electric.

According to sales estimates made by Bloomberg New Energy Finance, the sales volume in these six cities is such, that they would rank among the world's largest plug-in electric car markets in 2018, if compared with the top selling countries in 2018, excluding China and the U.S.

According to China Passenger Car Association (CPCA), in 2023, cities such as Shenzhen, Chengdu, Guangzhou, Chongqing, and Beijing led the way and made great contributions to the new energy commercial vehicle market. Among them, Shenzhen ranks first in new energy vehicle sales with 300,953, followed by Chengdu with 309,760, Guangzhou with 276,989, Shanghai with 297,378, and Beijing with 290,976. And the sales top 20 cities in China accounts for 55% of all NECV sales in 2023.

=== Overseas market ===
In 2019-2020, China's new energy vehicle exports were mainly concentrated in Asia, mainly in ASEAN, India and Bangladesh. In 2021, China's new energy vehicle exports began to gradually open up the European and American markets, and Europe became one of the important markets for China's new energy vehicle exports.

In 2023, China's new energy vehicle exports reached 1.203 million units, a year-on-year increase of 77.6%, accounting for 24.5% of the total automobile exports, and the export destinations covered more than 180 countries around the world. In 2024, China's new energy vehicle exports exceeded 2 million units, a year-on-year increase of 12%, and it continued to be the world's largest exporter of new energy vehicles.

== Charging and refueling infrastructure ==
=== EV charging stations ===
China has been building EV charging infrastructure ever since 2013 and experienced the most public charging growth infrastructure since 2013. In 2019 China accounted for more than half of the world public EV charging stations. In the year of 2019 China built 180,000 public charging stations. Per capita charging stations in China still falls behind other markets. China's 200 charging stations per million is about half of what the European Union holds per capita. As of early 2021, there were more than 800,000 public charging stations in China, accounting for almost 2/3rd of all public charging stations worldwide. According to the China Electric Vehicle Charging Infrastructure Promotion Alliance, Guangdong has the biggest EV charging network in China, with 345,126 public chargers and 19,116 charging stations as of the end of September 2022, more than doubling from the previous year. (The main reason is that the Guangdong Provincial Government attaches great importance to the construction of charging infrastructure for new energy vehicles; Guangdong Province has achieved full coverage of charging infrastructure construction in highway service areas and townships; Guangdong Province has attracted the active participation of many charging operation companies ) Most charging stations are operated by either state-owned energy companies, battery makers or EV manufacturers. In 2022, 360,000 public slow charging point were installed in China, making the total of slow chargers in the country to more than 1 million. At the end of 2022, China was home to more than half of the global stock of public slow chargers. For fast chargers, the number increased by 330,000 globally in 2022, and again the majority (almost 90%) of the growth came from China. In 2022, China has a total of 760,000 fast chargers. The charging station energy companies also increased diversity, with 3,000 companies providing over 40 billion kWh charging amount in 2022, 85% increase over last year. By the end of 2022, China now also has 16,721 charging stations in 3,974 highway service areas. By the end of 2024, China's highway service areas will have built a total of 35,000 charging piles, with a coverage rate of 98%.

Among the companies operating China's EV charging stations, including Teladian, Xingxing Charging, State Grid, and Yunkuai Charging, Teladian operates the largest number of charging piles. The company has also developed a "charging network" system for managing intelligent across multiple vehicles within a region.

=== Hydrogen refueling stations ===
In December 2020, China had 104 public hydrogen fuel stations, ranking second worldwide behind Japan. Sinopec plans building an additional 1,000 stations by 2026.

In the first half of 2022, China has completed over 270 hydrogen refueling stations, leading globally with around 40% of the total refueling stations. Hydrogen energy is a secondary energy source with rich sources, green and low carbon emission, it can be used as a key energy source when fighting against climate crisis. China is now the country with the largest hydrogen production, with annual production about 33 million tons. In early 2023, China has over 350 hydrogen refueling stations. By the end of 2024, China has built more than 540 hydrogen refueling stations. During the period of the "14th Five Year Plan", Sinopec aims to build 1,000 hydrogen refueling stations in China, by 2030, China plans to create the largest network of hydrogen refueling station in the world, having over 1000 stations in the nation. The goal is to create the new industrial chain and system that does not reply on oil. Thus counter the climate crisis.

From the perspective of each province, China's hydrogen refueling station construction presents a multi-point development trend. Until June 2024, among the provincial administrative units, only Tibet has no hydrogen refueling station built. Guangdong Province ranks first with 68 stations, and 7 provinces and cities including Shandong, Hebei, Jiangsu, Hubei, Zhejiang, Shanxi, and Henan have more than 20 stations. 7 provinces and cities including Beijing, Shanghai, Sichuan, Anhui, Liaoning, Inner Mongolia, and Chongqing have between 10 and 20 stations. The rest of the provinces and cities have less than 10 stations.

== Passenger cars sales by model ==
The following table presents annual sales of new energy passenger cars by model between January 2011 and December 2015.

Sales of top selling new energy passenger vehicles in China by model between January 2011 and December 2015
Model	Total sales 2011–2015	NEV segment market share^{(1)}	Sales 2015	Sales 2014	Sales 2013	Sales 2012	Sales 2011
BYD Qin	46,787	10.5%	31,898	14,747	142	—N/a	—N/a
Kandi EV	31,134	7.0%	16,736	14,398	—N/a	—N/a	—N/a
BAIC E150/160/200 EV	23,832	5.4%	16,488	5,234	1,466	644	
BYD Tang	18,375	4.1%	18,375	—N/a	—N/a	—N/a	—N/a
Chery QQ3 EV	16,247^{(2)}	3.7%	3,208^{(2)}	2,016^{(3)}	5,727	3,129	2,167
Zotye Cloud/Z100 EV	15,467	3.5%	15,467	—N/a	—N/a	—N/a	—N/a
JAC J3/iEV	15,279	3.5%	~9,000	~1,000	1,309	2,485	1,585^{(4)}
BYD e6	14,257^{(5)}	3.2%	7,029	3,560	1,544	1,690	401
Zotye Zhidou E20	13,726	3.1%	6,385	7,341	—N/a	—N/a	—N/a
SAIC Roewe 550 PHEV	11,711	2.6%	10,711	~1,000	—N/a	—N/a	—N/a
Chery eQ	7,804	1.8%	7,262	542	—N/a	—N/a	—N/a
Tesla Model S	5,524^{(6)}	1.2%	3,025^{(6)}	2,499	—N/a	—N/a	—N/a
Geely-Kandi Panda EV	4,939	1.1%	3,654	1,285	—N/a	—N/a	—N/a
Zhidou D2	3,777	0.8%	3,777	—N/a	—N/a	—N/a	—N/a
BYD F3DM	3,284^{(5)}	0.7%	—N/a	—N/a	1,005	1,201	613
Denza EV	3,020	0.7%	2,888	132	—N/a	—N/a	—N/a
Zhidou D1	2,387	0.5%	2,387	—N/a	—N/a	—N/a	—N/a
Venucia e30	2,071	0.5%	1,271	582	—N/a	—N/a	—N/a
BYD e5	1,426	0.3%	1,426	—N/a	—N/a	—N/a	—N/a
SAIC Roewe E50	1,227	0.3%	412	168	409	238	—N/a
Zotye TT EV	1,984	0.4%	1,984	—N/a	—N/a	—N/a	—N/a
Total new energy vehicles sales	444,447^{(7)}	-	331,092	74,763	17,642	12,791	8,159
Notes: (1) Model market share as percentage of the 444,447 new energy vehicles sold between 2011 and December 2015. (2) Only sales between January and June 2015. (3) Only includes sales between January and March 2014. (4) Combined sales for 2010 and 2011. (5) BYD e6 total includes 33 units sold in 2010. F3DM total includes 417 units sold in 2010 and 48 in 2009. (6) Tesla Model S sales through September 2015. (7) Total annual NEV sales figures include heavy-duty vehicles, such all-electric buses and sanitation trucks, but do not include Tesla Model S sales nor any other imports.

== Chinese consumers' preferences for new energy vehicles ==
In 2024, Chinese consumers' preferences for new energy vehicles will show the following characteristics:

1. The acceptance of new energy vehicles continues to increase: With the continuous advancement of new energy vehicle technology and the improvement of infrastructure, more and more Chinese consumers have a positive attitude towards new energy vehicles. According to iiMedia Research, more than 70% of consumers are optimistic about new energy vehicles. According to Deloitte Consulting report in 2025, 27% of Chinese respondents consider buying pure electric vehicles, which is much higher than the 5% in the United States.

2. Range and safety performance are key factors affecting car purchase decisions: According to iiMedia Research, when purchasing new energy vehicles, the factors that consumers are most concerned about include maximum range, vehicle safety and price.

== China new energy vehicles sales model ==
The sales model of new energy vehicles in China has undergone significant changes in recent years, mainly reflected in the shift from the traditional dealer model to the direct sales model or agency model.

Traditionally, the Chinese auto market adopts the "4S" store model, but some Chinese NEV manufacturers, such as NIO, have adopted a direct sales model to connect directly with consumers through self-operated stores. According to Landroads' sales service capability research on 31 new energy brands in the first half of 2024, NIO's direct sales model performed well in three dimensions: basic service capabilities, customer satisfaction, and employee professionalism.

Some manufacturers have also begun to explore the agency sales model. In this model, manufacturers work with dealers, who act as agents to sell vehicles on behalf of the manufacturer. In November 2023, NIO began recruiting dealer partners, hinting that it would adopt an agency model to expand its sales network.

== Challenges ==
Subsidies are expected to be reduced in 2025, and subsidies for some models may be halved, which may dampen consumer enthusiasm for new energy vehicles and lead to slower growth in the overall new energy passenger vehicle market.

International political and economic uncertainty could also further affect China's new energy vehicle market. The impending return of Donald Trump's administration to the United States could lead to additional tariffs and industry restrictions against China, exacerbating economic uncertainty. Meanwhile, pending negotiations on the EU's imposition of high anti-subsidy duties on Chinese pure electric vehicles could disrupt the global automotive supply chain.

== See also ==
- Electric car
- Electric car use by country
- Electric vehicle industry in China
- Government incentives for plug-in electric vehicles
- List of battery electric vehicles
- Plug-in electric vehicles in Hong Kong
- Plug-in electric vehicles in Taiwan
