= Plug-in electric vehicles in Hong Kong =

Overview of electric vehicles in Hong Kong

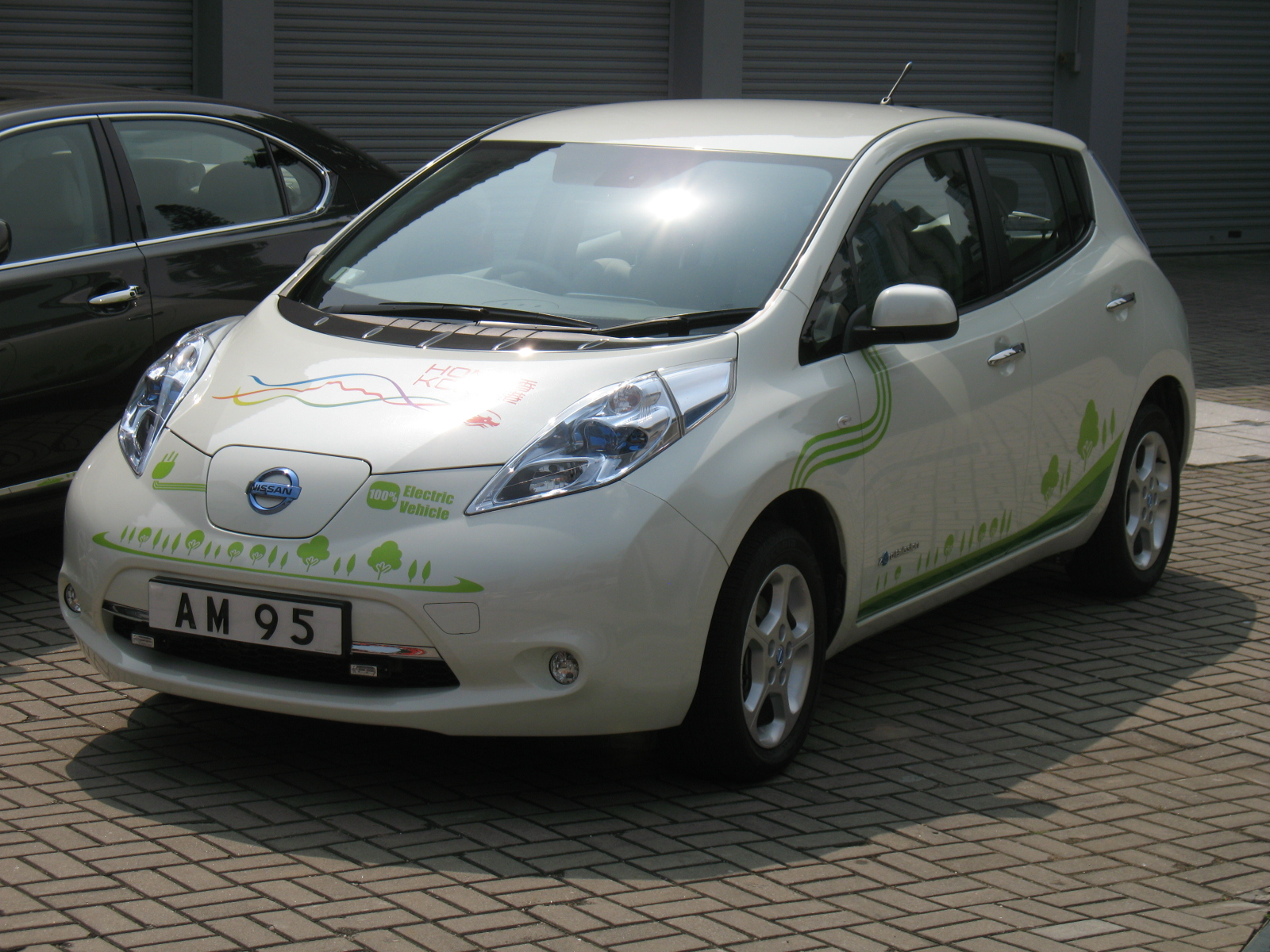
A Nissan Leaf electric car in Hong Kong.

The adoption of electric vehicles in Hong Kong is actively supported by the Hong Kong government, which recognizes battery electric vehicles, plug-in hybrids, and conventional hybrid electric vehicles to be environmentally friendly and eligible for financial incentives. As of 31 October 2017, there were 11,039 electric vehicles in Hong Kong, up from less than 100 in 2010. At present, 73 EV models from eight countries have been approved by the Transport Department to be eligible for the incentives. These include 51 models for private cars and motorcycles and 22 models for public transport and commercial vehicles.

== Current electric vehicle policy ==
In March 1994, the government waived the First Registration Tax for EVs. The tax was extended several times, and the most recent extension lasted until March 2017. However, EVs are yet to be popular in Hong Kong. Since the 2009–10 Policy Address, a series of schemes and policies have been implemented by the government to actively promote and encourage the use of EVs. In order to coordinate the work in promoting EVs, the Steering Committee on the Promotion of Electric Vehicles was established in April 2012. The committee is chaired by the Financial Secretary with two-year terms, along with 16 other members who represent government departments and the private sector. The government's aim is to have zero emission buses running across the territory. The government allocated $180 million to purchase 36 single-deck electric buses, which includes 28 battery-electric buses and 8 super-capacitor buses. 18 battery-electric buses and 2 super-capacitor buses have commenced operation. Most of the remaining electric buses were expected to be put into service progressively in late 2017 or early 2018.

== Reasons for the promotion of electric vehicles ==
=== Environmental aspect ===
In 2014, the Hong Kong Emission Inventory Report indicated that the road transport sector was the largest local air pollution source; 60% of carbon monoxide emissions came from transportation. The replacement of gasoline with electricity in EVs improves the air quality in cities, since carbon emissions are reduced. Along with minimising various pollution problems and lowering the risk of respiratory illnesses, noises and vibrations are also eliminated since EVs do not use chemical combustions. Under the assumption that the annual mileage is 20,000 km and consideration over the emissions from generations, the estimated amount of carbon dioxide emitted is around 1,880 kg, 33% and 47% less than that of hybrid cars and petrol vehicles respectively.

=== Economic aspect ===
EVs have a higher energy efficiency than traditional petrol vehicles, allowing 80% of input energy to be converted into usable power, which is a 15%–20% improvement than the latter. With technological advancements, EVs have a higher battery capacity that allows 100 km of traveling distance after a single charge, far higher than the original 40 km in early development. By comparing EVs with petrol vehicles over the energy cost, the price of the latter is around 13.6 times higher in the case from Tuen Mun to Mong Kok (30 km; HKD4.7:HKD36.7). The 2011–12 Financial Budget highlighted that the value brought by the green development increased by 12.4% with the 3.6% surge of employees. With an emphasis on a green economy and smart cities in the 2015–16 Financial Budget, the government believed that the high cost-effectiveness of EVs allowed creation of businesses and employment opportunities like the complementary accessories of EVs and R&D for further scientific innovations in the ever-expanding market.

== Current figures ==
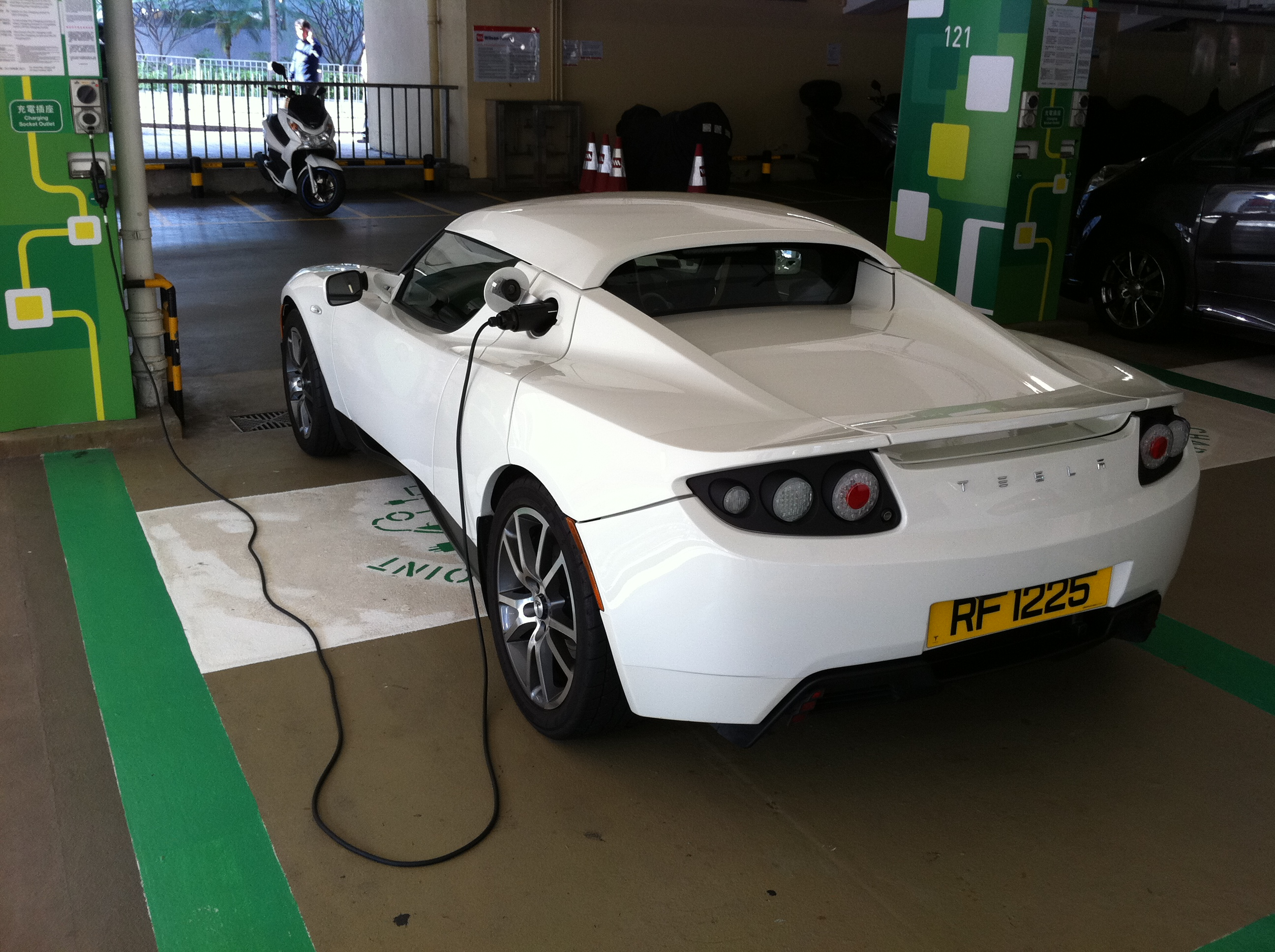
A Tesla Roadster charging at Central Star Ferry car park in Hong Kong.

In 2009, 28 local EVs were registered; as of 30 April 2016, 5,042 EVs (4,899 were private vehicles) were registered for road use. In October 2017, there were 11,039 EVs for road use, up from less than 100 at the end of 2010. As of 2017, 73 EV models from eight countries have been type-approved by the Transport Department. These include 51 models for private cars and motorcycles and 22 models for public transport and commercial vehicles. There is a 3% growth in new EV registrations, which is higher than other developed automobile markets. From January to May 2015, more than 1,110 longer-range models of Tesla EVs were sold, accounting for nearly 95% in the EV market.

As of the end of June 2023, the total is 60,943 EVs. At present, 240 EV models from 16 economies have been type-approved by the Transport Department. These include 187 models for private cars and motorcycles and 53 models for public transport and commercial vehicles.

Over 1,300 public chargers are spread throughout all 18 local districts, whereas one public charger is available for use by four EVs on average. 921 chargers are standard, 239 are medium, 15 are CHAdeMO quick chargers and 145 are quick chargers with transferable charging standards. The chargers can fully charge an EV within 30 minutes, compared to 8 hours previously. The government and other stakeholders are determined to enhance the charging efficiency of these public charging infrastructures through various ongoing infrastructure-led collaborations. For example, Charge Hong Kong, a non-profit organization, is working to increase charging facilities in public areas and upgrade the existing public standard chargers to the medium or multi-standard quick type.

Under the Pilot Green Transport Fund, 92 EVs were included for trial under a total subsidy of around $96 million in total. The two models of electric vans as interim trial reflected that 50–80% of the fuel costs were saved with no negative and uncertain outcomes in terms of their batteries and performance. These reflected that EVs are compatible with local operating conditions with huge green innovative development potentials in the future.

== Promotion ==
The government is committed to promoting the use of EVs within different sectors of society. A number of favourable measures have been adopted to boost the use of EVs.

=== Economic incentives ===
Economic incentives have lowered the overall cost of EVs and encouraged their use. An exemption of the first registration tax on EVs was introduced in 1997 to promote the use of greener vehicles. The financial secretary extended the waiver of the first registration tax in the 2009 budget, which lasted until the end of March 2017. Moreover, enterprises purchasing EVs will enjoy another tax deduction, which is a full “profits tax reduction for the capital expenditure on the EVs in the first year of procurement”.

=== Financial support ===
To encourage the public transport sector to use EVs, the government offered the industry some financial assistance programs, such as the “Pilot Green Transport Fund”.(See the above section.) The fund targets public transport service providers and attracts them to use innovative and green technologies for trial. Other financial assistance have been put in place, such as the one-off grant to PLB owners and the allocation of $180 million HKD for franchised bus runners to purchase electric buses. The former aims to upgrade PLB emission standard to that of EV, while the latter serves to test the use of EVs and promote the use of EVs.

=== Infrastructure and technical support ===
The government has dedicated itself to increasing the number of charging sockets, as well as to collaborating with EV manufacturing firms to develop more advanced charging facilities. Apart from infrastructure support, the government has also issued a set of guidelines on the safe use of EV chargers and provides hotline service for information and technical support.

=== Promotional activity ===
In an effort to promote the use of EVs in Hong Kong, the government provides a range of support, ranging from introducing preferential policies to holding promotional activities. The government prioritizes replacing government vehicles with EVs. In 2013, it was estimated that over 200 government vehicles were EVs. The government also helps organize the FIA Formula E Championship, an event to encourage public interest in EVs.

== Criticism ==
=== Chargers ===
As of April 2016, there were 1,320 public chargers in Hong Kong, distributed unequally in different territories. There were nearly 500 public chargers in Hong Kong Island, whereas fewer than 400 in New Territories and Island Districts, which cover the most area of Hong Kong (see Diagram 1 below). Therefore, the insufficiency of chargers in rural areas is a great concern to some EV drivers. Some drivers opined that it is not ideal to rely on public chargers, in particular when one could hardly find a parking space in Hong Kong. Some even complained that the public parking space for EVs are often occupied by non-EVs.

Diagram 1. The Number of Chargers for EV in Hong Kong as at April 2016
Region/Speed of Charger	Standard	Medium	Quick	Total
Hong Kong Island	359	90	47	496
Kowloon	315	68	46	429
New Territories and Island Districts	247	81	67	395
				1320

Another criticism is the formidability for individuals to install chargers in private car parks. The installation of chargers in private buildings has to undergo an array of procedures. According to the guidelines from the government, individual owners of EVs have to consult the owner of the car park space, the dealer of the EV, the property management company and the registered electrical contractor. Apart from lowering the feasibility of charging the EV at work and at home, this also hinders the incentive of using EVs in the long run.

There are 4 types of charging sockets (UK, Europe, US and Japan) for EV in Hong Kong, inter alia, only the Japanese socket could serve a fast charge (in 20 minutes). However, 76% of the chargers in Hong Kong are slow chargers which takes 5 to 12 hours for an EV to be fully charged.

=== Indirect Increase in Carbon Dioxide Emission ===
Using EV is not necessarily reducing carbon dioxide emission. It depends on the carbon intensity of electricity generation. Coal is used for over half of the power generation in Hong Kong, and research finds that an EV might emit more carbon dioxide than non-EV over 150000-kilometre lifetime after taking into account the carbon intensity of electricity generation and the subsequent production of car batteries.

== Lessons learnt from overseas EV policies ==
=== Singapore ===
The emphasis of Singaporean government's EVs policy is placed on the cooperation with vehicle manufacturers and technology companies. By launching EV test-bed and forming agreement with Chinese companies to introduce EV into their public transportation, the determination of the government to utilize EVs as environmental policy to combat air pollution is clearly shown. However, surprisingly, as opposed to Hong Kong, the most popular EV model in Singapore is not Tesla. One may suggest the biggest obstacles come from the international oil company, which considers Singapore as the hub of oil refinement and trading center, hence acting as the tripping stone for the government to continuously promote the use of EVs.

=== United Kingdom ===
The British government introduced EVs into the market by launching the “green car revolution” programme. The program included a range of incentives, government support, legislation and education programs, suggesting that by 2020 all new cars sold in the UK should be either hybrid or electric. Apart from large-scale subsidies and tax reductions to incentivize the purchase of EVs, the government launched “Plugged-in-Places” to increase vehicle recharging points and convenience, as well as a 100% discount for the London Congestion Charge. The British government's comprehensive strategy resulted in a more than 20-fold increase of EVs being registered in the UK from 2011 to 2015.

== Future development ==
In response to progress in promoting EVs, the Hong Kong Productivity Council listed 13 suggested measures for the government to increase its utility rate. The first step was that the government lay out a comprehensive EVs development plan, including stages and corresponding goals. The council also advised the government to explore possibilities in promoting EVs by improving their chargers, for instance increase charging rate, introduce a central database that shows all EV charging stations in Hong Kong, and increase the number of commercial charging stations in residential and business areas. The Council urged the government to devote resources to cultivating technicians and engineers specialized in EVs to prepare for the upcoming demand in human resources. The Environmental Bureau is now organising a competition to invite public to brainstorm innovative ideas of alternative use of disposed EV batteries. In line with global trends, it is believed EV will continue to be in Hong Kong government's agenda to combat air pollution.

== See also ==
- Government incentives for plug-in electric vehicles
- List of modern production plug-in electric vehicles
