= Poer =

Poer, la Poer or le Poer may refer to:

== People ==
- Edmond de la Poer, 1st Count de la Poer (1841–1915), Irish politician
- Raymond Beresford Poer, Irish Anglican Dean of Ross from 1946 to 1968
- Robert le Poer (died c. 1346), Irish judge, Lord High Treasurer of Ireland and Chief Baron of the Irish Exchequer
- Roger le Poer, Lord Chancellor from 1135 until 1139 for King Stephen of England

== Other uses ==
- Baron La Poer, a title in the Peerage of Ireland
- Great Wall Pao, also known as the Poer P11/P12, a line of pickup trucks made by Great Wall Motors
