= GWM Tank 400 =

Mid-size SUV

Tank 400
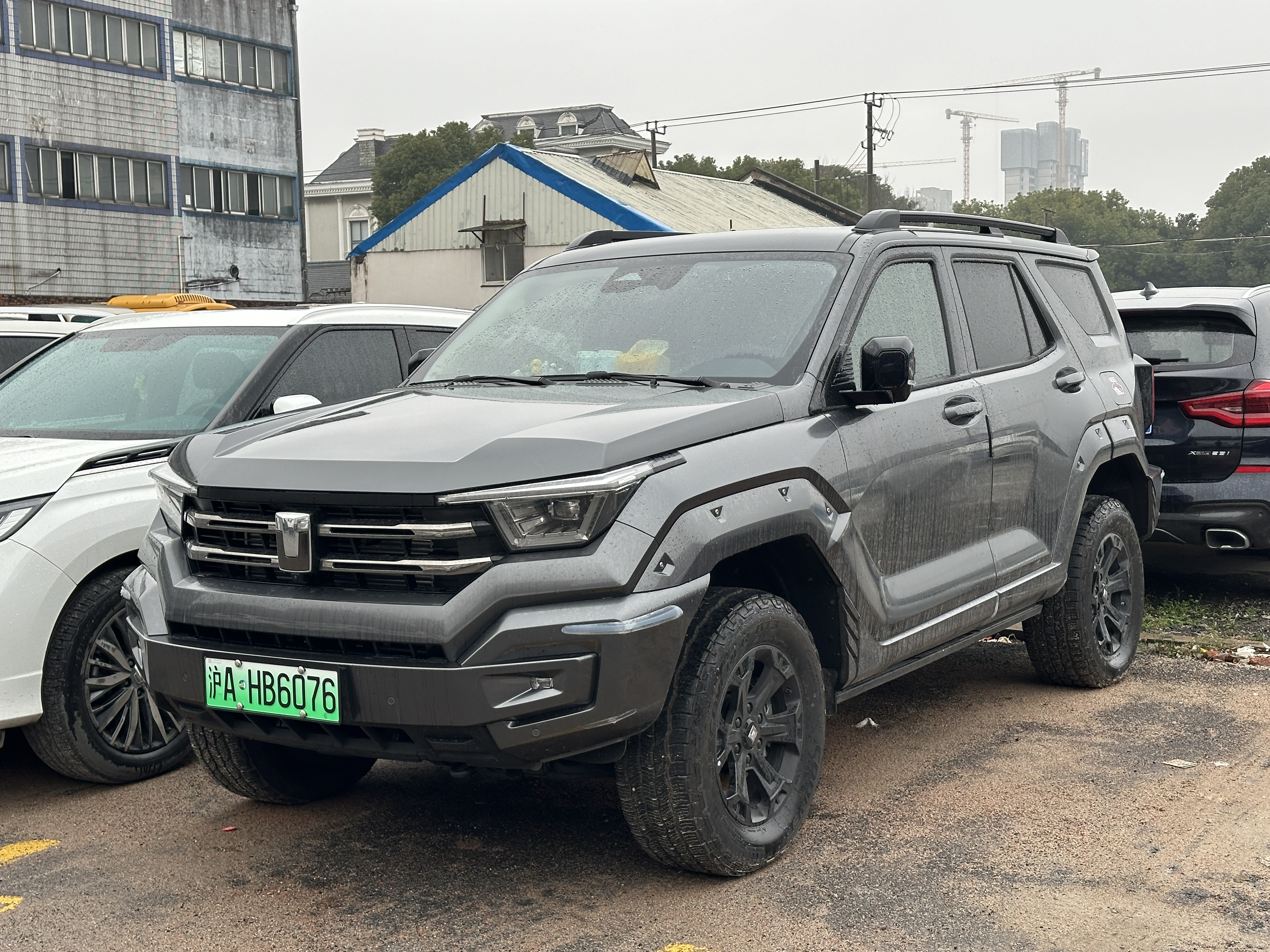

Overview
- Manufacturer: Great Wall Motor
- Also called: Tank 400 (China)
- Production: 2023–present
- Assembly: China: Tianjin

Body and chassis
- Class: Mid-size SUV
- Body style: 5-door SUV
- Layout: Longitudinal front-engine, four-wheel drive
- Platform: GWM Tank
- Chassis: Ladder frame

Powertrain
- Engine: 2.0 L GW4N20 PHEV turbo I4
- Power output: 408 hp (304 kW; 414 PS) (PHEV)
- Transmission: 9-speed 9AT/9HAT automatic
- Electric range: 105 km (65 mi) (WLTC)

Dimensions
- Wheelbase: 2,850 mm (112.2 in)
- Length: 4,878 mm (192.0 in)
- Width: 1,960 mm (77.2 in)
- Height: 1,905 mm (75.0 in)
- Kerb weight: 2,455–2,770 kg (5,412–6,107 lb)

The GWM Tank 400 or Tank 400 (Chinese: 坦克400; pinyin: Tǎnkè 400) is a mid-size SUV produced by Great Wall Motor. It is the third model to be introduced under the Tank marque.

== Overview ==
The Tank 400 debuted in 2021 at Auto Shanghai in parallel with the Tank 500. Like other SUVs, the vehicle has a monocoque frame and a double-wishbone front suspension. The interior trim is the same as that of the 500. Sales began on 25 August 2023 in China.

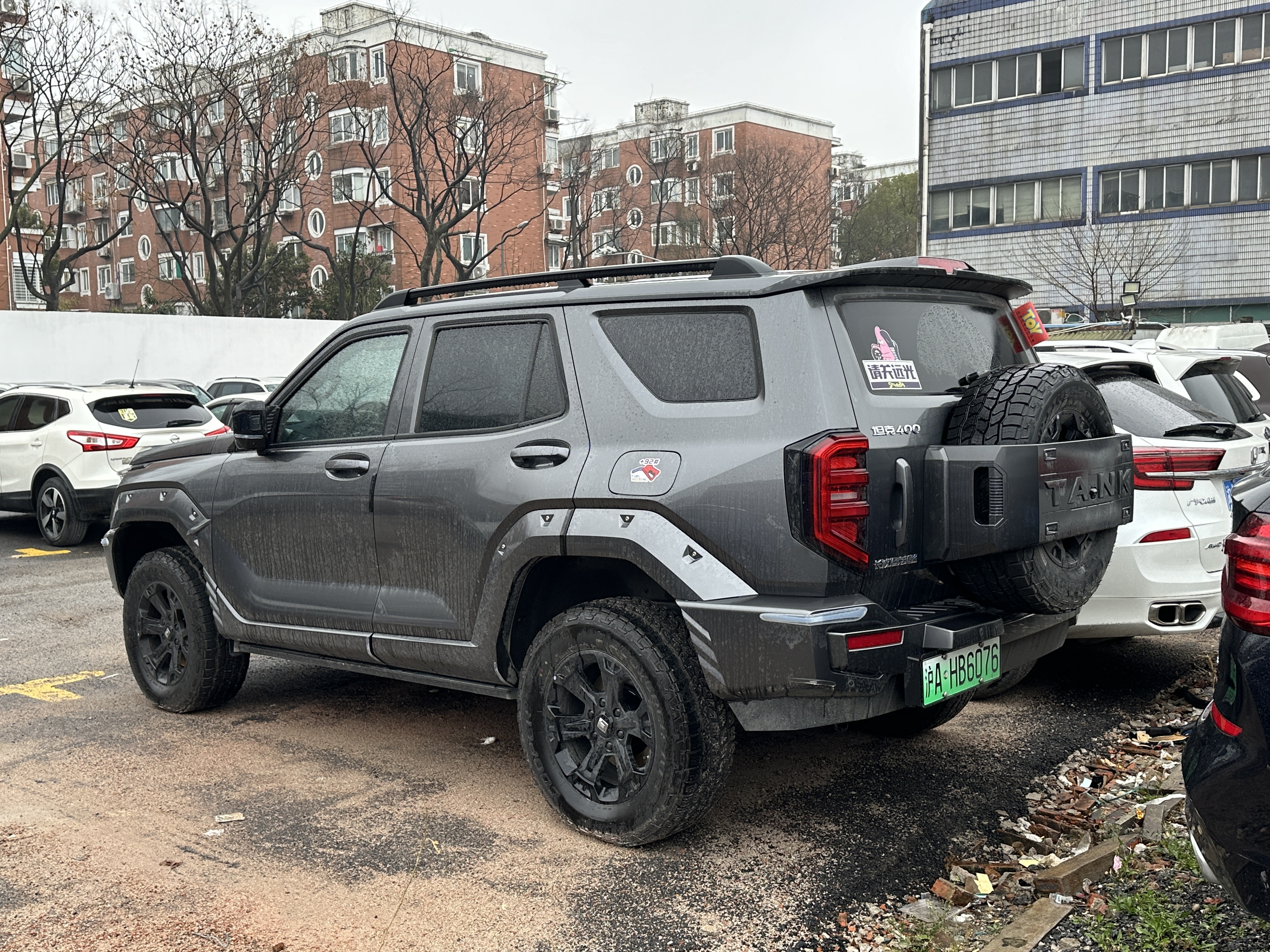
Rear view

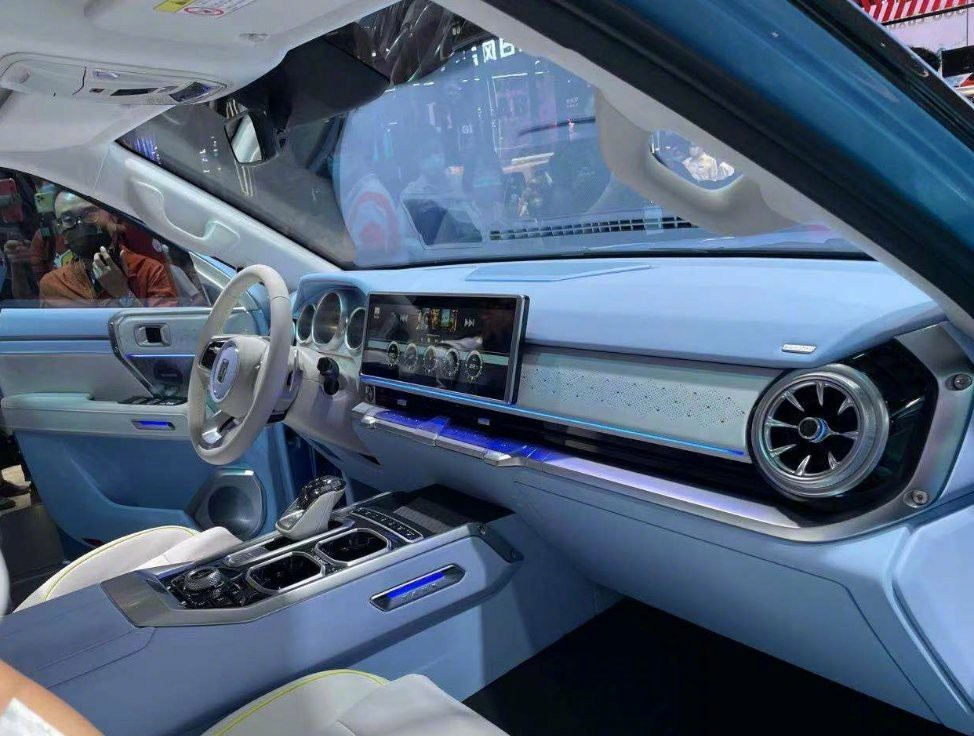
Interior

== Specifications ==
The 400 is equipped with a two-liter, four-cylinder turbocharged gasoline engine producing 252 hp (188 kW; 255 PS) and a torque of 380 N⋅m (280 lb⋅ft), which is paired with a nine-speed automatic transmission. There is also a plug-in hybrid Tank 400 Hi4-T (PHEV) with a 408 hp (304 kW; 414 PS) electric motor and a torque of 750 N⋅m (553 lb⋅ft); the Hi4-T module would also be installed on the Tank 300 and Tank 500. According to the WLTC cycle, the pure electric range is 105 km (65 mi). The fording depth for an SUV is 800 mm (31 in). The car is capable of towing a trailer weighing 2.5 tons. The trunk volume is 566 litres (20.0 cu ft).

== Sales ==
Year	China		
Year	400	PHEV	Total
2023	—	9,574	9,574
2024	370	44,246	44,616
2025	4,599	39,791	44,390

== See also ==
- GWM Tank
