= Arthur Gordon =

Arthur Gordon may refer to:

- Arthur Hamilton-Gordon, 1st Baron Stanmore (1829–1912), British colonial administrator
- Arthur Gordon (politician) (1896–1953), Canadian manufacturer and politician
- Arthur Gordon (priest) (born 1910), Dean of Ross, Ireland, 1968–1978
- Arthur E. Gordon (1902–1989), American Classicist

== See also ==
- Gordon Arthur (disambiguation)
