= Gordon Arthur =

Gordon Arthur may refer to:

- Gordon Arthur (footballer) (born 1958), Scottish former footballer
- Gordon Arthur (bishop) (1909–1992), Anglican bishop in Australia

== See also ==
- Arthur Gordon (disambiguation)
