= Tank (marque) =

Chinese automotive marque

- Product type: Automobile
- Current owner: Great Wall Motor
- Country: China
- Introduced: March 2021; 5 years ago
- Related brands: Wey
- Markets: Worldwide, currently Asia-Pacific
- Ambassador: Yanzhao Lui (Tank brand CEO)
- Website: tanksuv.com (China)

Chinese name
- Simplified Chinese: 坦克
- Hanyu Pinyin: Tǎnkè

Tank or GWM Tank (Chinese: 坦克; pinyin: Tǎnkè, styled in all caps) is an automotive marque owned by the Chinese carmarker Great Wall Motor (GWM). The brand specialises in off-road oriented SUVs.

The brand was named after the Tank platform that underpin GWM Tank vehicles.

== History ==
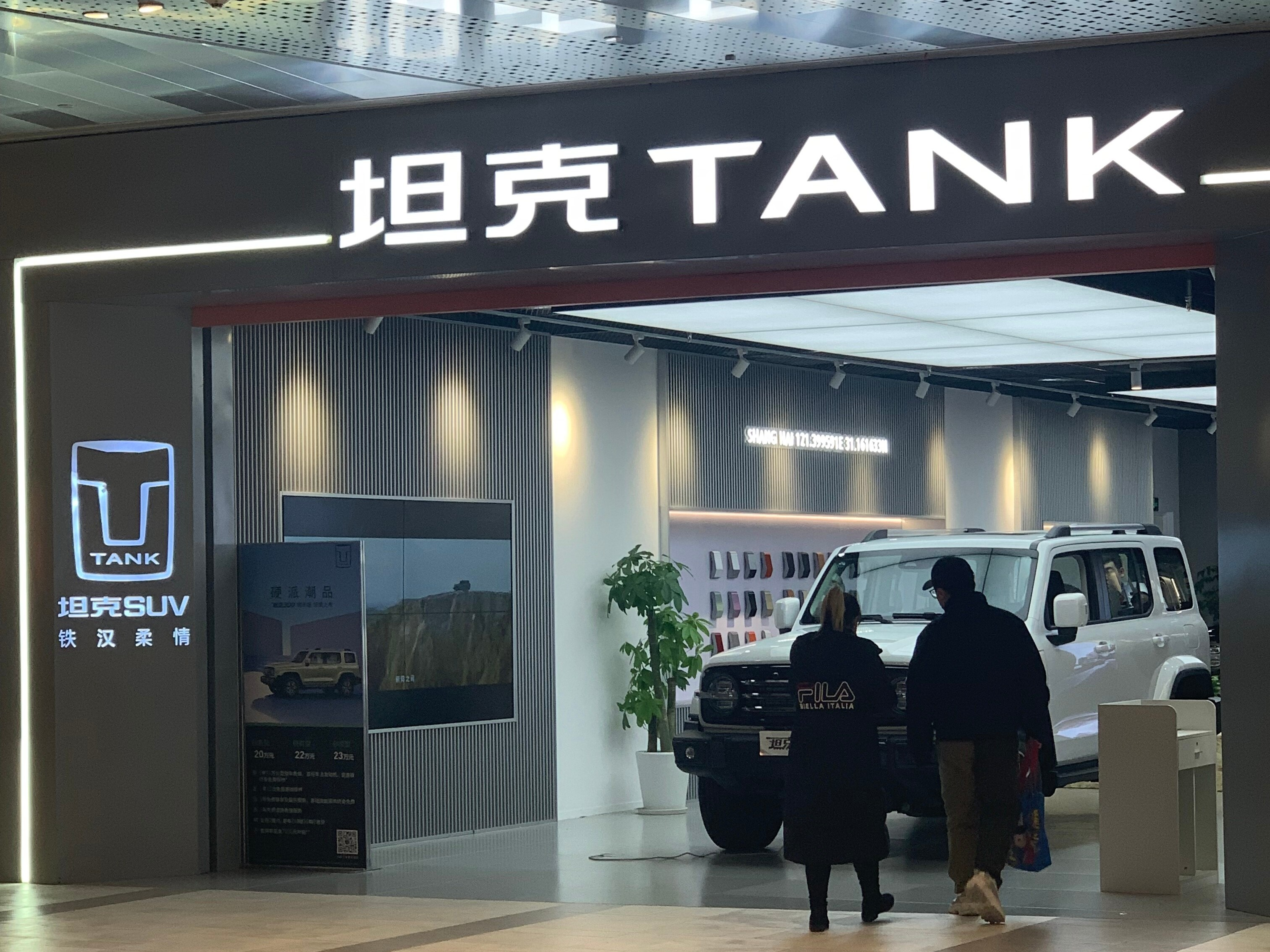
A Tank showroom in China

In July 2020, GWM introduced three platforms with the brand name "L.E.M.O.N.", "Tank", and "Coffee Intelligence". Among them, the Tank platform is a longitudinal platform mainly for hard-core off-road vehicles that supports internal combustion engine (ICE), hybrid electric (HEV), and plug-in hybrid (PHEV). According to GWM, the Tank platform would be used by B-class (equivalent to D-segment) to D+-class (above F-segment) SUV and pickup truck market segments. The first SUV that uses the Tank platform is the Wey Tank 300, introduced in July 2020 at the Chengdu Auto Show.

In March 2021, GWM that it would market off-road vehicles from the Tank series under the independent Tank brand. Wey would be positioned as an urban SUV brand, while the Tank series will focus on off-road oriented SUVs. The 300 became the first model of the brand.

As part of Auto Shanghai in 2021, two more off-road vehicles were presented with the Tank 700 and Tank 800. The Tank 400 and Tank 500 were further previewed in August 2021.

== Products ==
=== Current models ===
- Tank 300 (2021–present)
  - Tank 330 (2024)
- Tank 400 (2023–present)
- Tank 500 (2021–present)
- Tank 700 (2024–present)
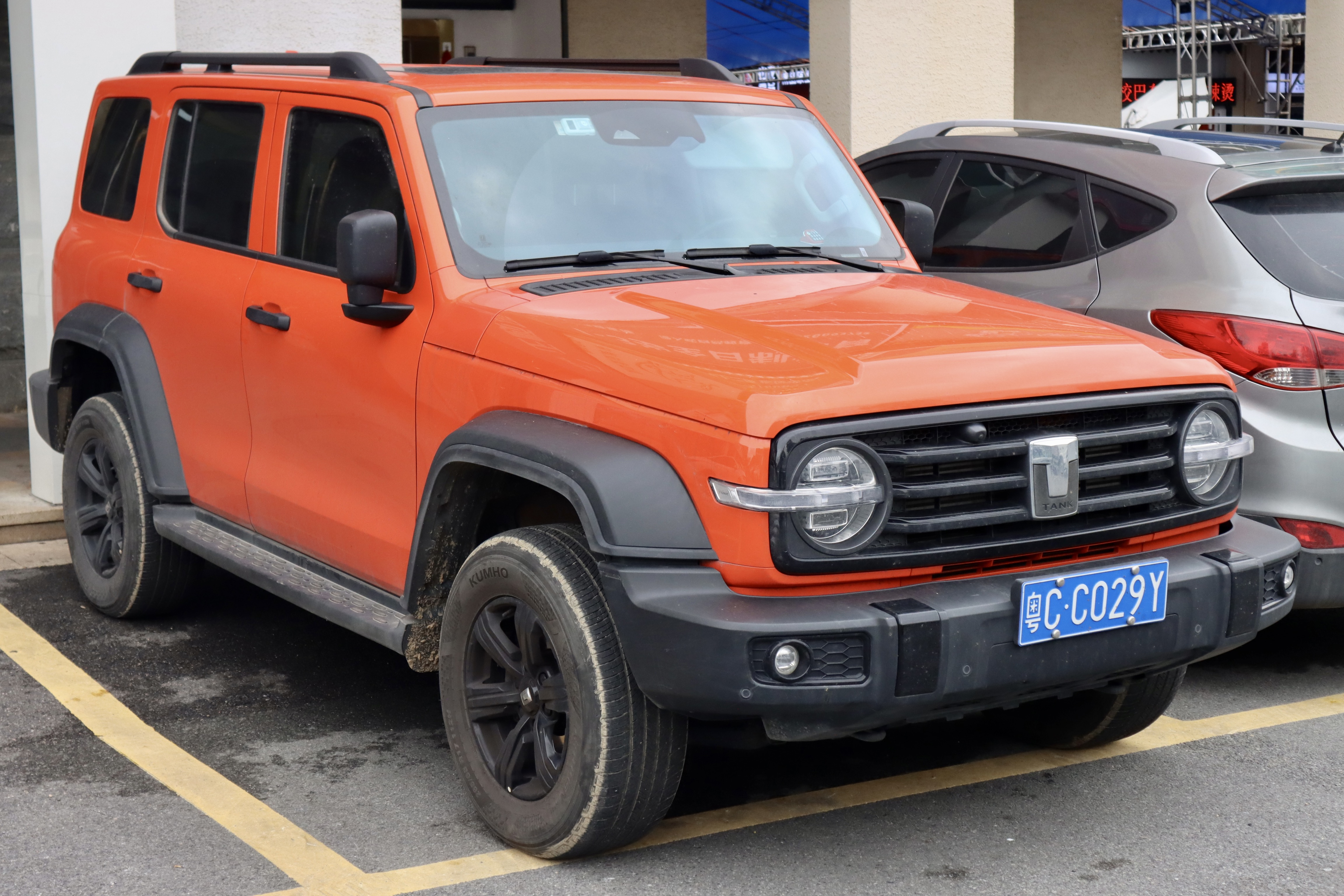
Tank 300

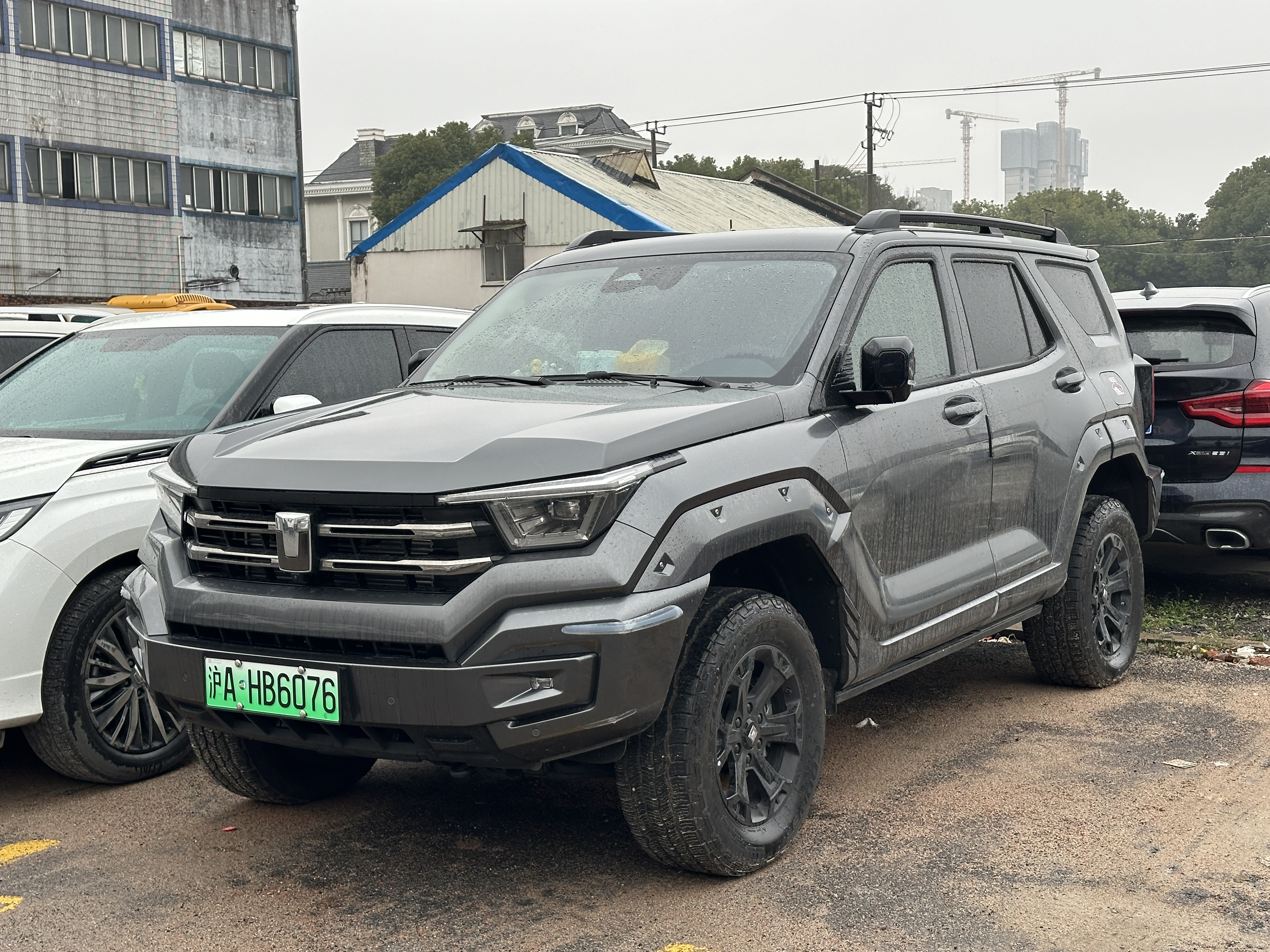
Tank 400

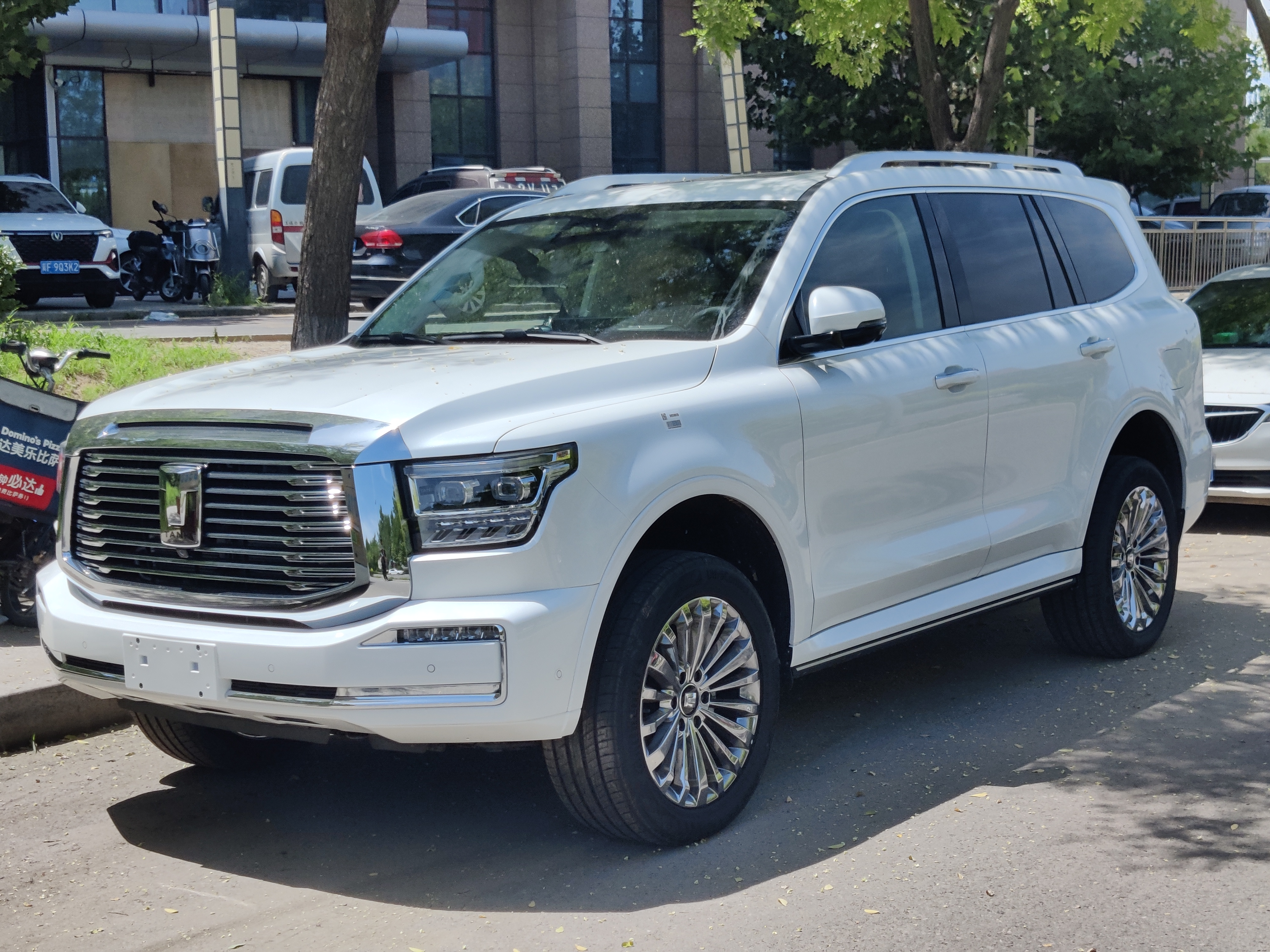
Tank 500

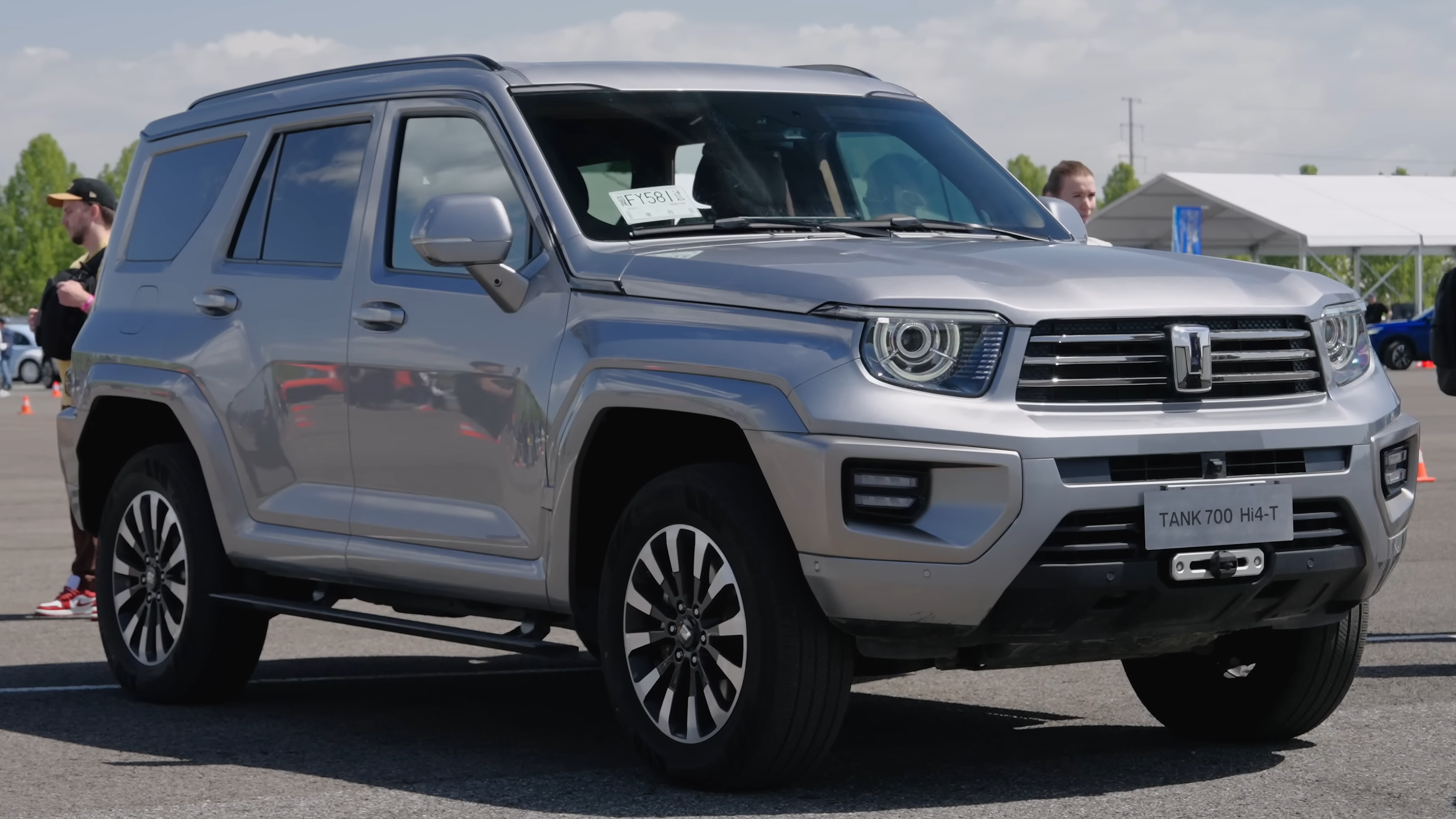
Tank 700

=== Cancelled ===
- Tank 800 (2021)
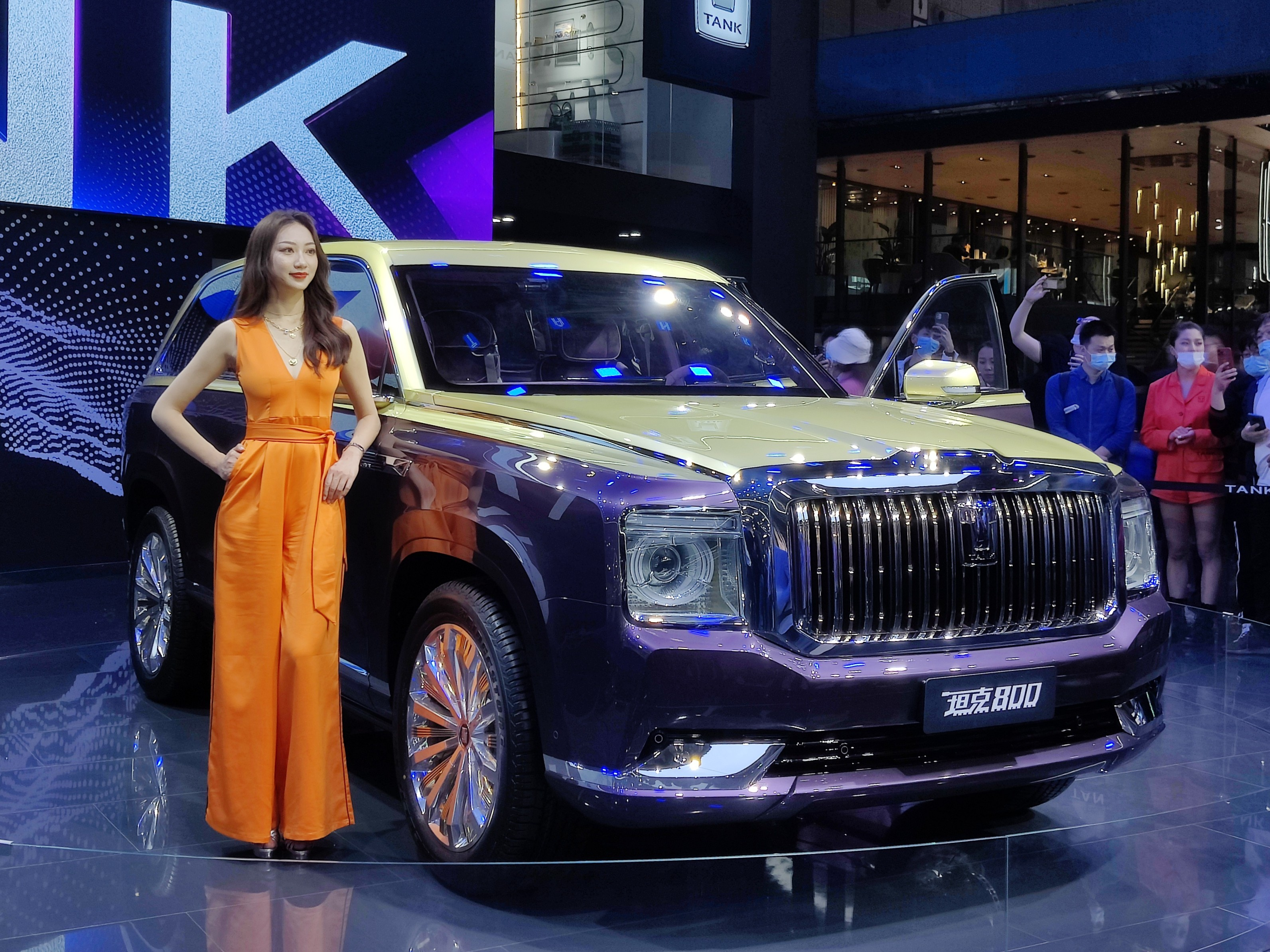
Tank 800

== See also ==
- Automobile manufacturers and brands of China
- List of automobile manufacturers of China
