= Arthur Gordon (priest) =

Arthur Gordon (11 May 1910 – 1982) was Dean of Ross from 1968 to 1978.

Gordon was educated at Trinity College, Dublin; and ordained in 1942. After a curacy in Kinsale he held incumbencies at Kilmeen (1943–47); Carrigaline, (1947–62); and Clonmel, (1962–78). He was precentor of Ross Cathedral from 1964 to 1967; and chancellor of the Diocese of Cork, Cloyne and Ross from 1976 to 1978. Gordon died in 1982.

Religious titles
Preceded by Raymond Beresford Poer	Dean of Ross, Ireland; 1968–1978	Succeeded by John Robert William Fleming
