= Tank 700 =

Full-size luxury SUV

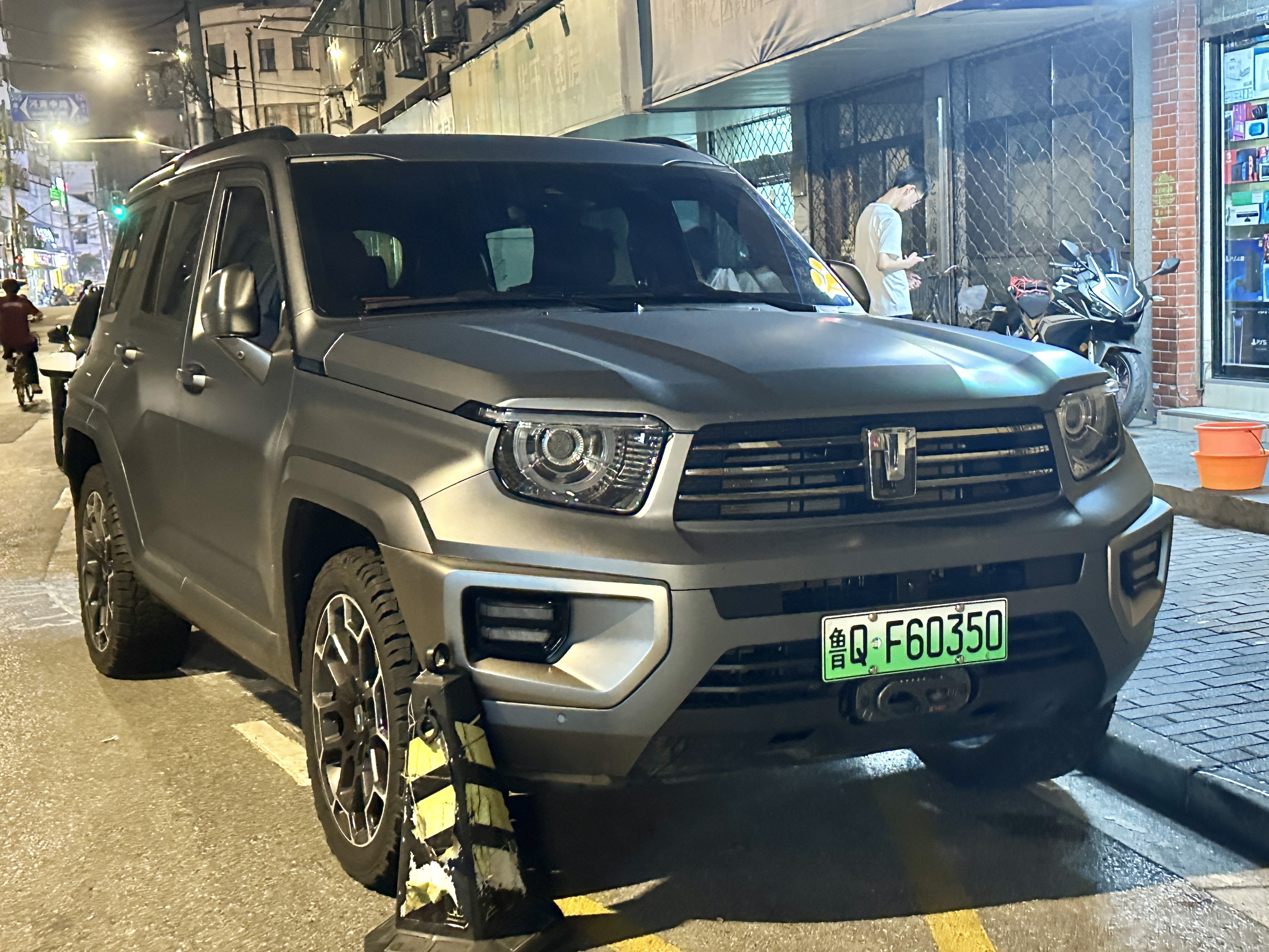

Overview
- Manufacturer: Great Wall Motor
- Production: 2024–present
- Assembly: China: Tianjin

Body and chassis
- Class: Full-size luxury SUV
- Body style: 5-door SUV
- Layout: Longitudinal front-engine, four-wheel drive
- Platform: GWM Tank
- Chassis: Body-on-frame

Powertrain
- Engine: Petrol plug-in hybrid: 3.0 L E30Z PHEV turbo V6; Diesel: 2.4 L GW4D24 I4 turbodiesel
- Power output: 516 hp (385 kW; 523 PS) (700 Hi4-T)
- Transmission: 9-speed 9AT/9HAT automatic
- Hybrid drivetrain: PHEV (700 Hi4-T)
- Battery: 37.1 kWh (Hi4-T)
- Electric range: 90 km (56 mi) (Hi4-T, WLTC)

Dimensions
- Wheelbase: 3,000 mm (118.1 in)
- Length: 5,090 mm (200.4 in)
- Width: 2,061 mm (81.1 in)
- Height: 1,952 mm (76.9 in)
- Kerb weight: 3,110 kg (6,856 lb)

The Tank 700 (Chinese: 坦克700; pinyin: Tǎnkè 700) is a full-size luxury SUV produced by Great Wall Motor. It is the fourth model to be introduced under the Tank marque.

== Overview ==
The Tank 700 sales began in February 2024, in China. The vehicle comes in three variants.

The 700 is powered by a 3.0-liter V6 twin-turbocharged engine paired with a P2 electric motor, delivering a combined output of 516 hp (385 kW; 523 PS) and a peak torque of 800 N⋅m (590 lb⋅ft) (850 N⋅m (627 lb⋅ft) for the limited edition). The transmission system is matched with a 9-speed automatic transmission for hybrids, achieving 0–100 km/h (62 mph) acceleration in the 5-second level. The pure electric range under NEDC conditions is 100 km (62 mi), with a comprehensive fuel consumption of 2.97 L/100 km (79 mpg_{‑US}; 95 mpg_{‑imp}) under WLTC conditions. V8 PHEV to compete with heavy duty pickup trucks.

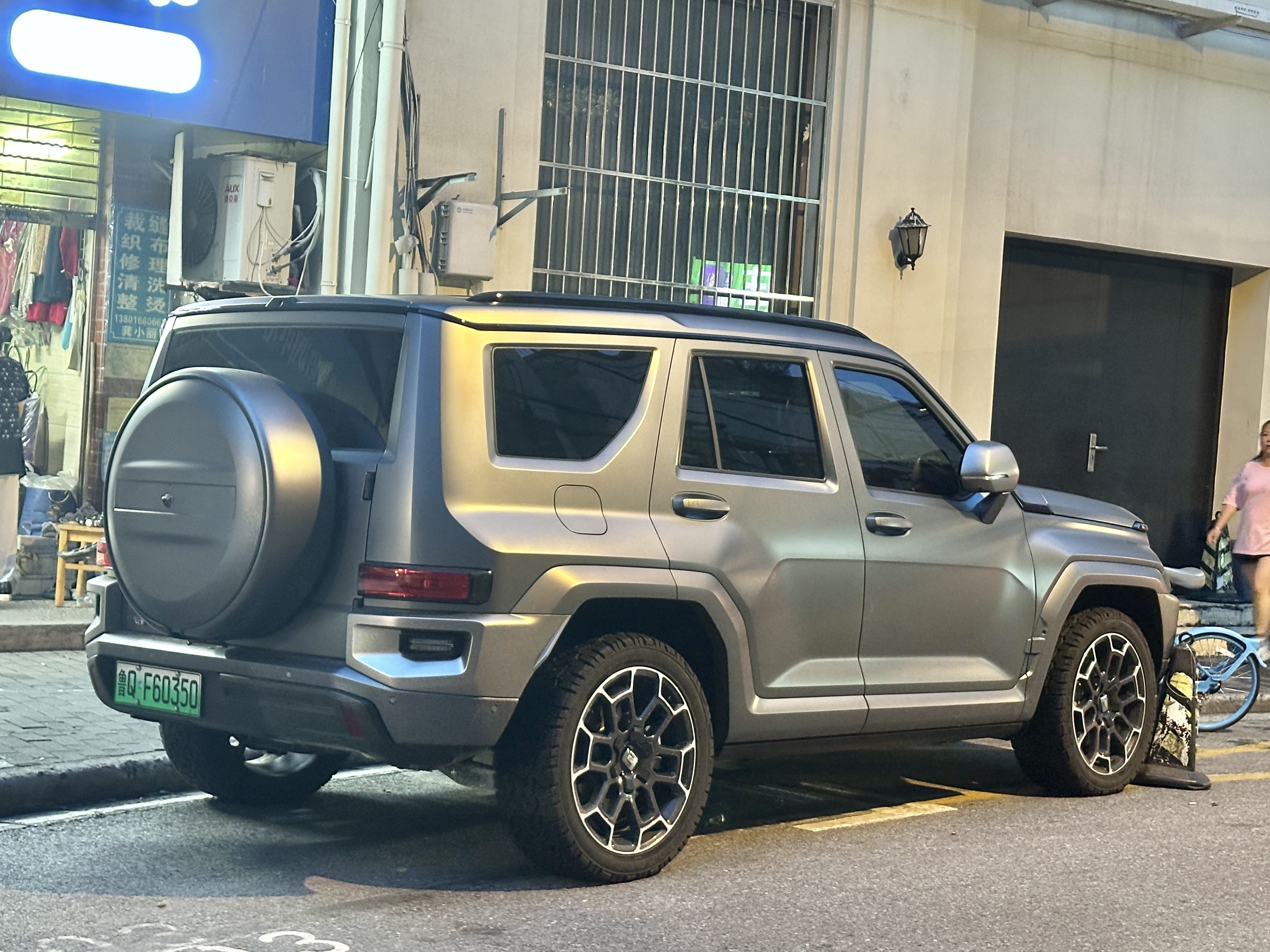
Rear view

== Sales ==
Year	China
2024	11,272
2025	4,796

== See also ==
- GWM Tank
