= GWM Tank 300 =

Mid-size SUV

Tank 300
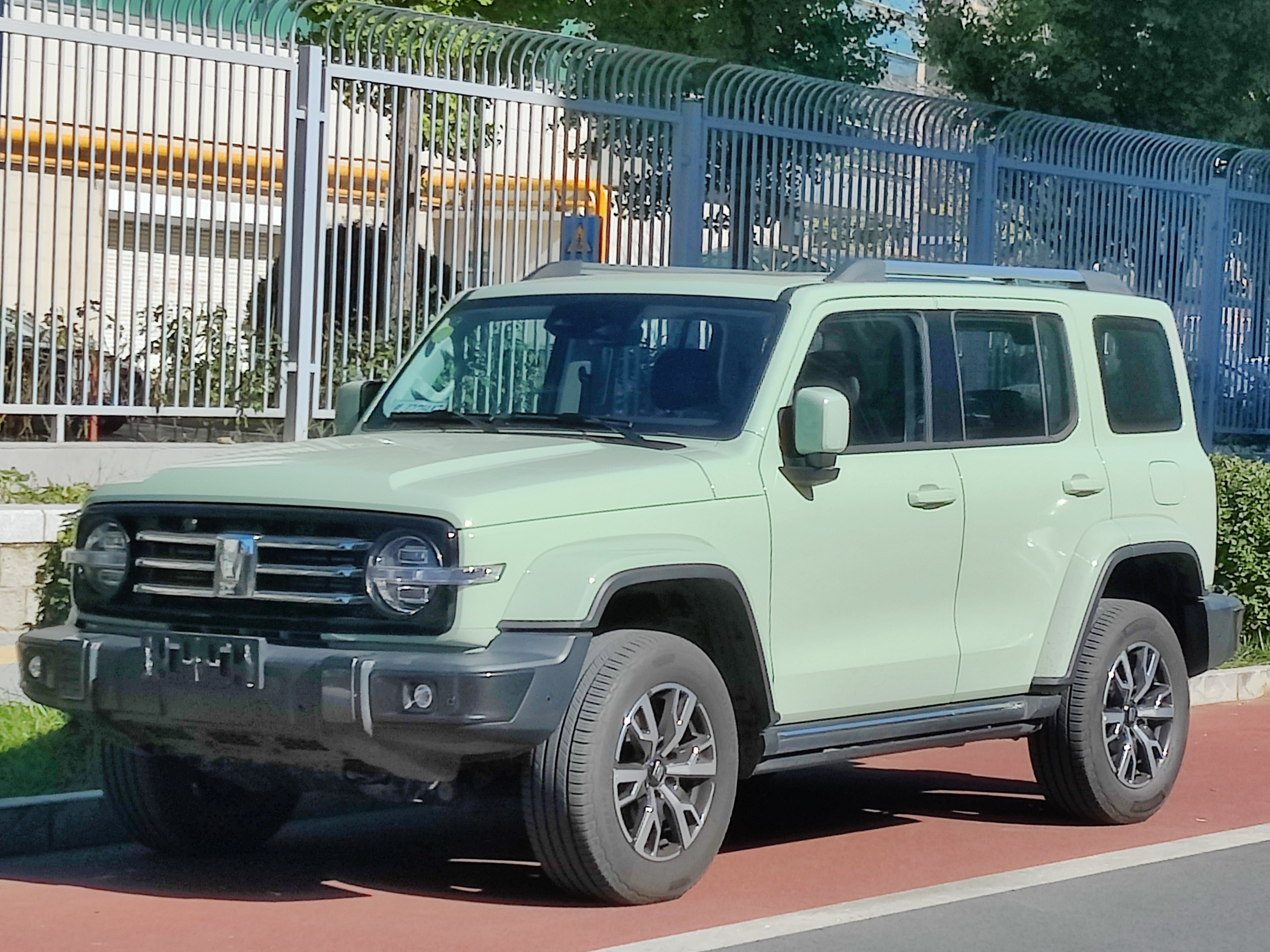
- 2021 Tank 300

Overview
- Manufacturer: Great Wall Motor
- Production: 2020–present

Body and chassis
- Class: Mid-size SUV (4-door)
- Layout: Front engine, rear-wheel drive / four-wheel drive
- Chassis: Body-on-frame

Chronology
- Predecessor: Great Wall Hover

The GWM Tank 300 or Tank 300 (Chinese: 坦克300; pinyin: Tǎnkè 300; lit. 'Tank 300') is a mid-size SUV with a neo-retro body produced by Great Wall Motor (GWM) since 2020. It was originally sold under the Wey premium brand as the Wey Tank 300. Since April 2021, the vehicle was renamed as the Tank 300 under the Tank brand, being positioned below the larger Tank 500. A V6-powered version is marketed as the Tank 330.

== First generation (2020) ==
Tank 300
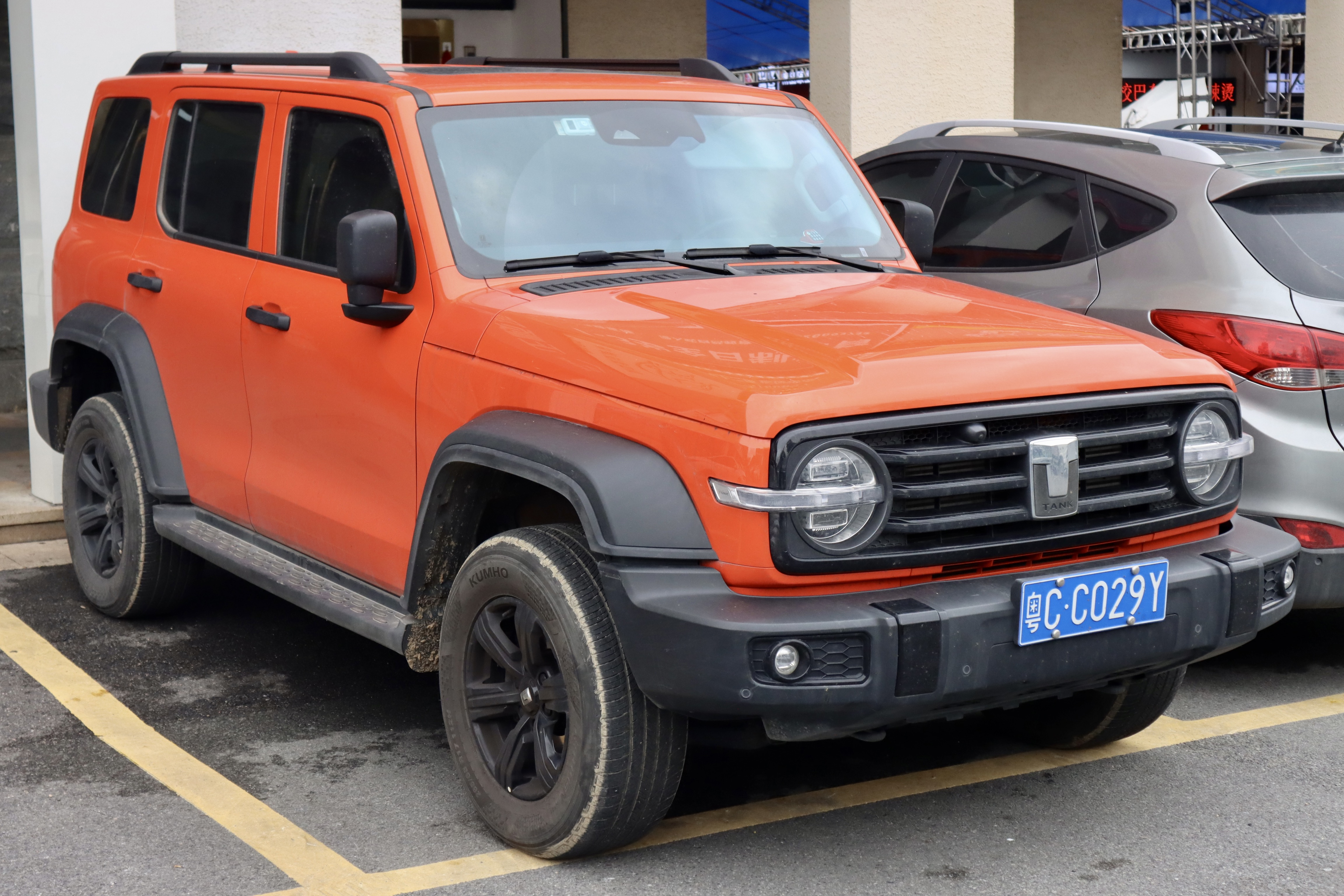

Overview
- Manufacturer: Great Wall Motor
- Also called: Wey Tank 300 (2020–2021); Tank 300 (China); Tank 330 (V6-powered models, 2024–present)
- Production: 2020–present
- Assembly: China: Chongqing; Thailand: Rayong (GWM Thailand)

Body and chassis
- Class: Mid-size SUV
- Body style: 5-door SUV
- Layout: Front-engine, rear-wheel-drive; Front-engine, four-wheel-drive
- Platform: GWM Tank
- Chassis: Ladder frame
- Related: Tank 500; Great Wall Pao

Powertrain
- Engine: Petrol: 2.0 L GW4C20NT turbo I4; 3.0 L E30Z twin-turbo V6 mild hybrid (Tank 330); Petrol hybrid: 2.0 L GW4N20 HEV turbo I4; Diesel: 2.4 L GW4D24 I4 turbodiesel
- Electric motor: TZ290XH003 3-in-1 motor drive system (hybrid)
- Transmission: 8-speed ZF 8HP automatic; 9-speed automatic (Tank 330); 9-speed 9HAT automatic (hybrid)
- Hybrid drivetrain: Power-split
- Battery: 48 V (mild hybrid); 1.75 kWh (hybrid); 37.11 kWh NMC (PHEV)
- Electric range: 105 km (65 mi) PHEV (CLTC)

Dimensions
- Wheelbase: 2,750 mm (108.3 in)
- Length: 4,760 mm (187.4 in)
- Width: 1,930 mm (76.0 in)
- Height: 1,927 mm (75.9 in)
- Curb weight: 2,155–2,313 kg (4,751–5,099 lb)

The first generation Tank 300 was introduced in July 2020 at the Chengdu Auto Show as the Wey Tank 300. It went on sale on the Chinese market on 17 December 2020. It is the first vehicle to be built on the platform called "Tank" by GWM.

Great Wall announced the decision to turn Tank into a standalone brand during the 2021 Shanghai Auto Show in April 2021, with its name written in capital letters. GWM was aiming to develop Tank as a standalone off-road vehicle marque, according to Wei Jianjun, chairman of GWM. The Tank 300 became the first car to be launched under the Tank brand.

According to GWM's Australian subsidiary, the Tank 300 has a ground clearance of 224 mm (8.8 in) with 33-degree approach and 34-degree departure angles. The SUV uses a double wishbone front suspension and multi-link coilover rear suspension. The ladder frame chassis is based on the same platform as the Great Wall Pao pickup. Available options are locking front and rear differentials, low-range gearing, an off-road creep mode, and a 'tank turn' function.

In China, the Tank 300 comes in several versions: City Edition, Off-Road Edition, Ranger, Wind Forest Iron Cavalry Edition, Yunliang and Cyberpunk. Each version, except for the Cybertank, is available in multiple trim levels.

The Cybertank Edition was previewed as the Wey Tank 300 Cybertank Concept in April 2021. It is equipped with wide body kit, body coloured flared wheel arches, a roof solar panel, Y-shaped LED daytime running lights, a hood scoop, and a square-shaped spare wheel cover on the tailgate. It enters production in a limited quantity, with an almost identical appearance to the concept model. Only 3,000 units were produced.

The Yunliang is a 300-unit limited production model, which went on sale in mid-2021. It is jointly developed with Yunliang 4×4, an off-road aftermarket parts company. It received changes such as a modified suspension with adjustable nitrogen shock absorbers, a snorkel, redesigned front bumper with winch, and BFGoodrich All-Terrain T/A 265/70 R17 tyres.

The Frontier Edition was announced in June 2022.

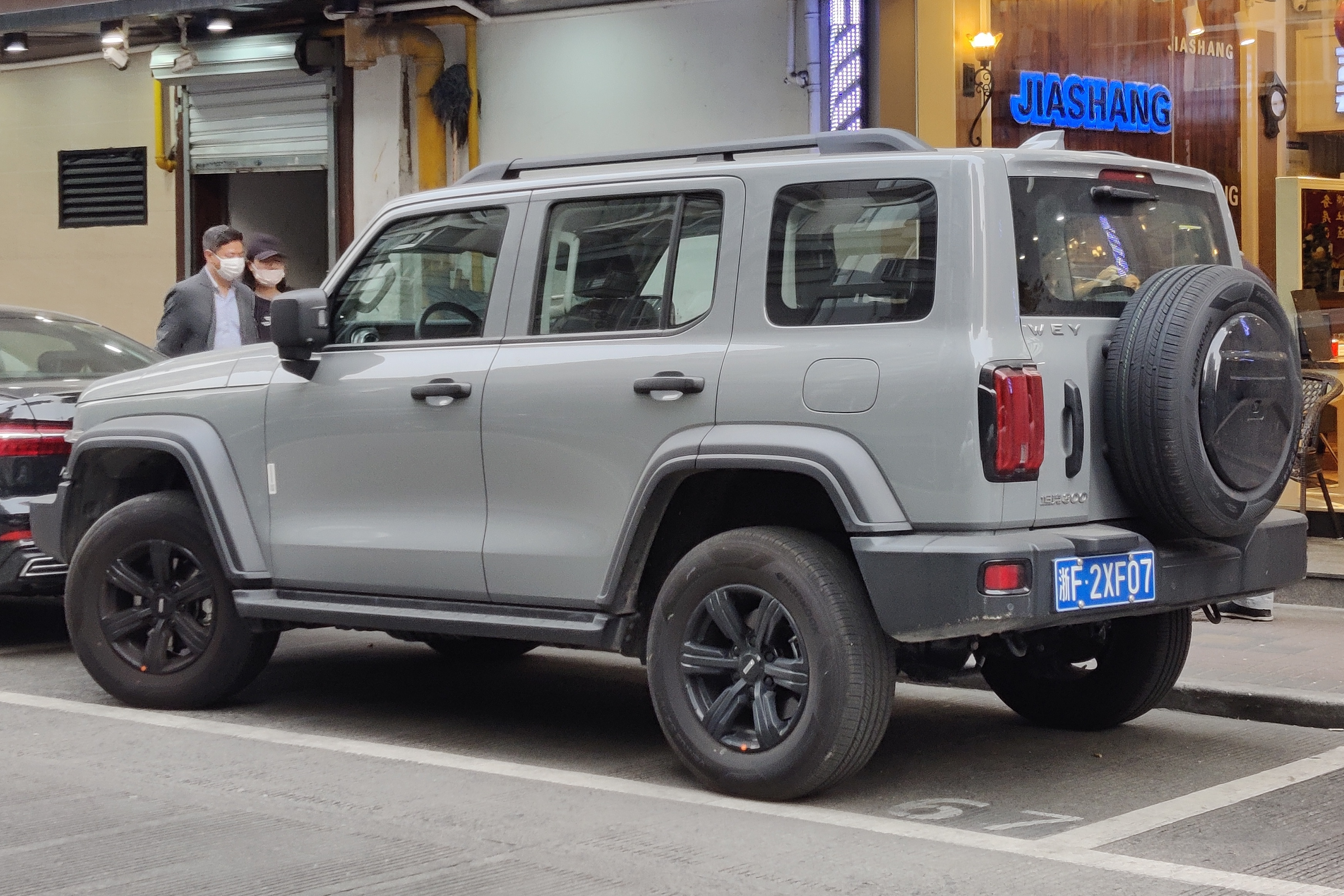
Wey Tank 300

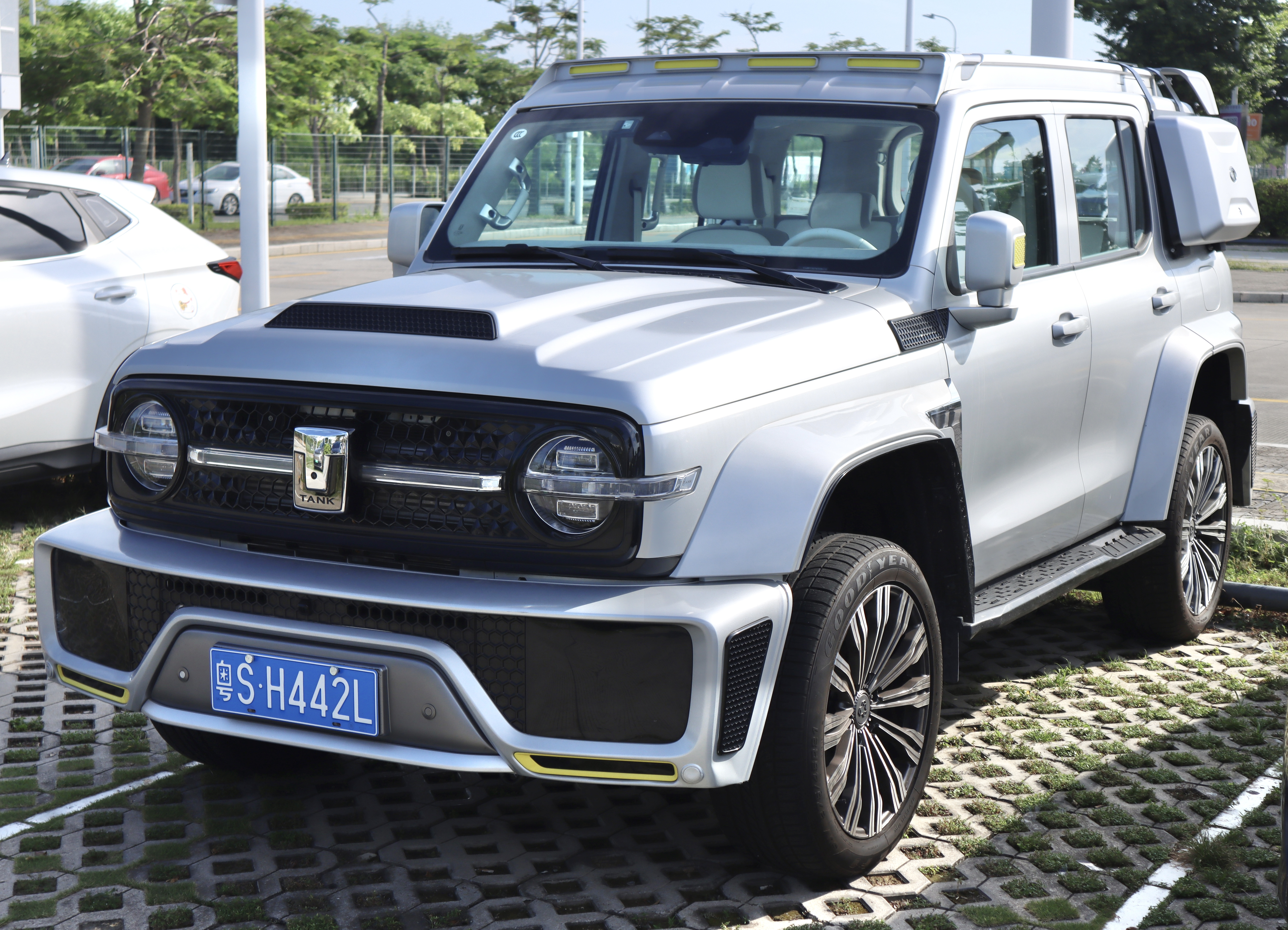
Tank 300 Cybertank Edition

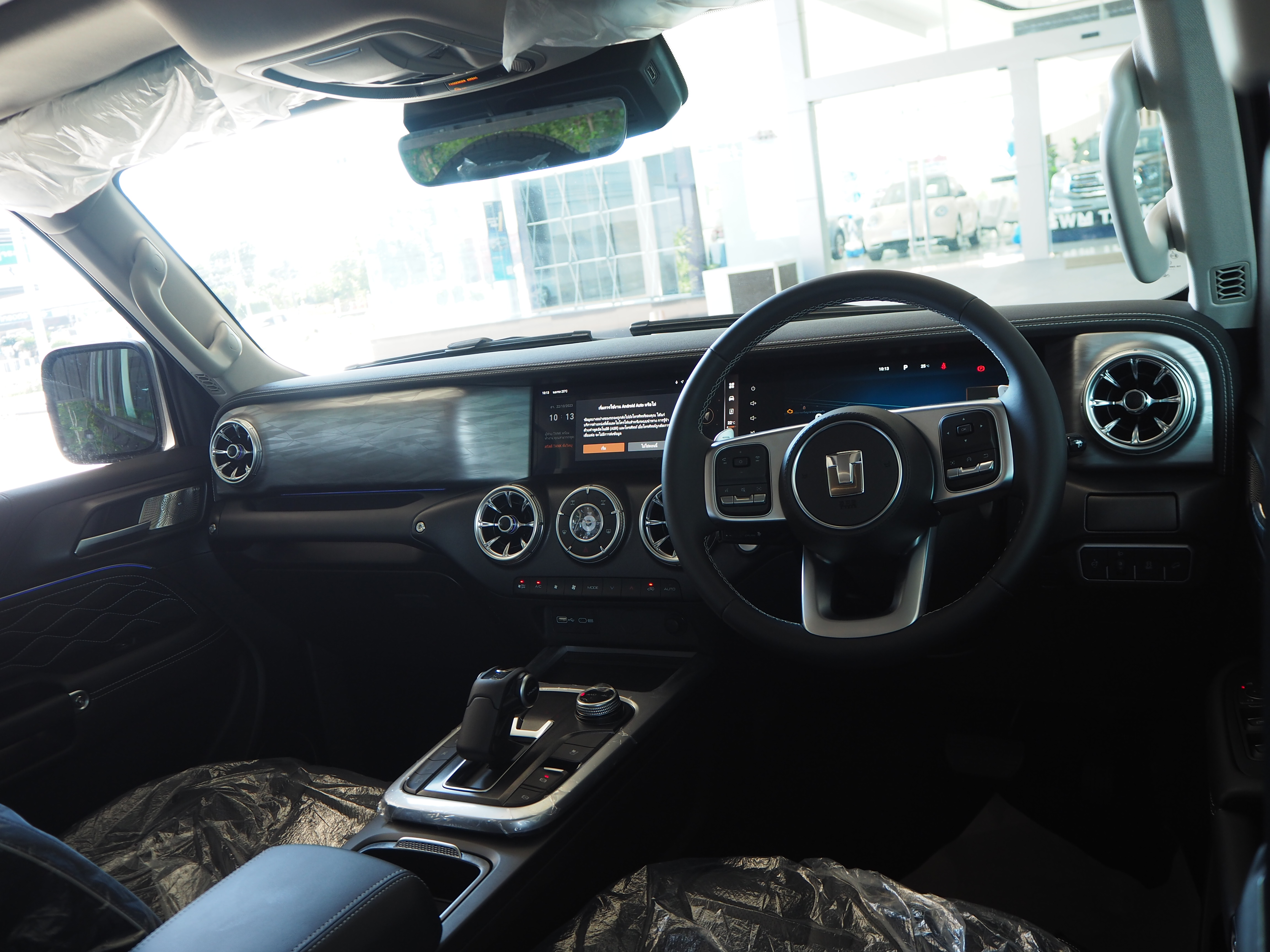
Interior

=== Tank 330 ===
In March 2024, the hybrid Tank 330 went on sale in China. It is powered by a 3.0-litre twin-turbo V6 petrol engine producing 265 kW (355 hp) and 500 N⋅m (369 ft⋅lb) of torque, paired with a 48 V electric motor. Its styling is based on the Tank 300 Frontier Edition, and the Tank 330 is only sold in limited quantities through online orders. Tank 330 sold out in six seconds.

=== Tank 300 Hooke Edition ===
The Tank 300 Hooke Edition is a prototype unveiled during Auto Shanghai 2025 which previewed the second generation Tank 300. The Hooke Edition is based on a GWM Tank 300 with the front axle moved forwards to provide a longer Dash-to-axle and features solid front axle accompanied by a strengthened frame. The Hooke Edition also offers front and rear differential locks and with the longer dash-to-axle, a larger engine bay is available suggesting the possibility to use a new 4.0-litre twin-turbo V8 (PHEV).

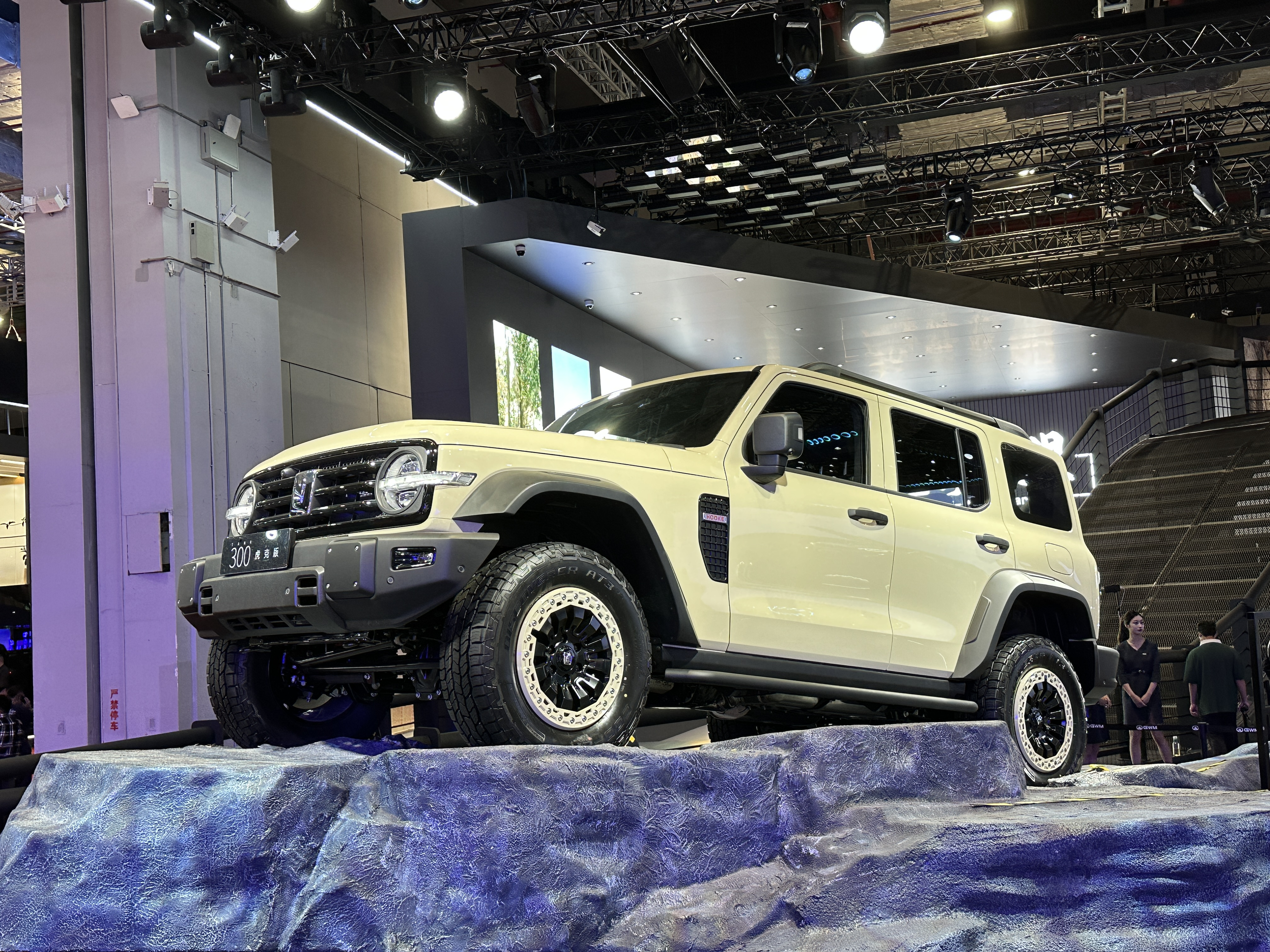
Tank 300 Hooke Edition

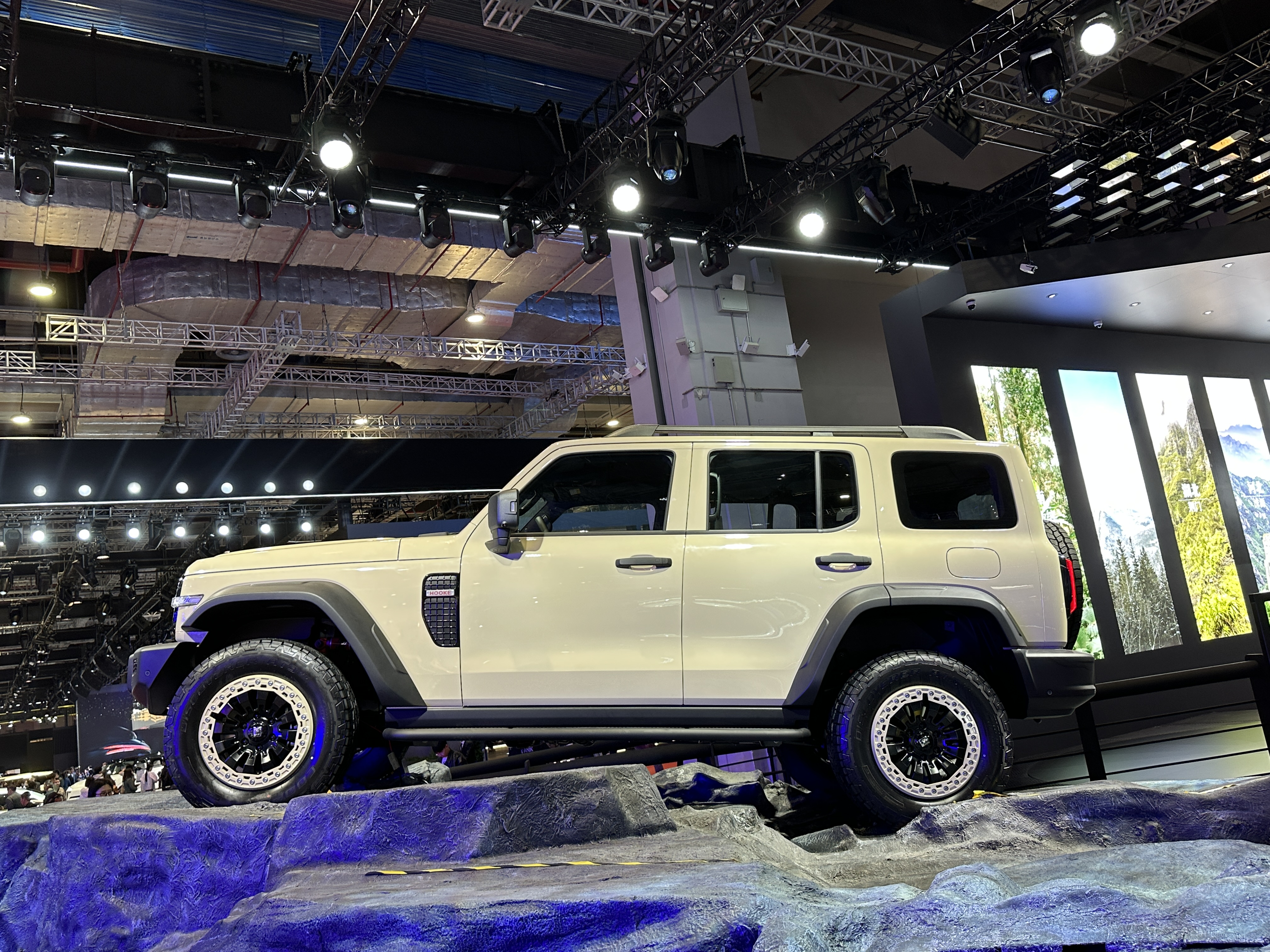
Side view (showing the extended dash-to-axle)

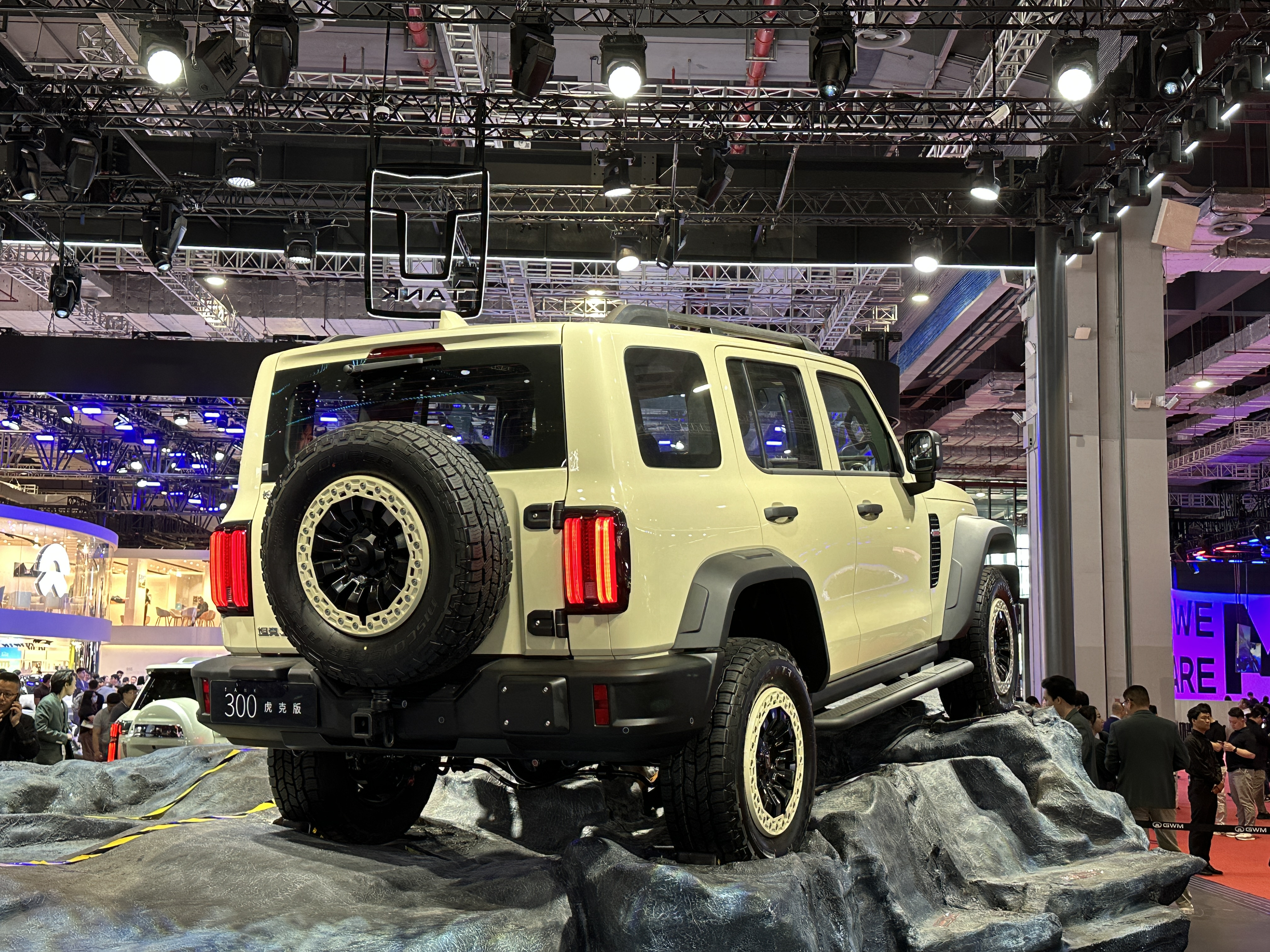
Rear view

=== Powertrain ===
The Tank 300 is powered by a 2.0-litre turbocharged petrol engine which is rated with an output of 167 kW (224 hp; 227 PS), peak torque at 380–387 N⋅m (280–285 lb⋅ft; 39–39 kg⋅m). The vehicle has three Eaton differential lockers and low range gearbox. GWM specifies the maximum speed at 170 km/h (106 mph).

The hybrid model debuted as the Tank 300 HEV concept car debuted in Thailand in March 2022. It is equipped with a 2.0T+9HAT powertrain and features transparent chassis technology. It was also previewed at the 25th Chengdu Auto Show in August 2022 alongside the Tank 500 PHEV. The combined system output is rated at 258 kW (346 hp; 351 PS) with 615 N⋅m (62.7 kg⋅m; 454 lb⋅ft) of torque. GWM claims the hybrid version can accelerate 0–100 km/h (0–62 mph) in 7.9 seconds.

Type	Engine code	Displ.	Power	Torque	Combined system output	Electric motor	Battery	Transmission	Layout	Cal. years
Petrol	GW4C20NT	1,967 cc (2.0 L) I4 turbocharged	162 kW (217 hp; 220 PS) @ 5,500 rpm	380–387 N⋅m (38.7–39.5 kg⋅m; 280–285 lb⋅ft) @ 1,800–3,600 rpm	-	-	-	8-speed ZF 8HP automatic	4WD	2020–present
Petrol mild hybrid	E30Z	3.0 L twin-turbo V6 mild hybrid (Tank 330)	265 kW (355 hp; 360 PS)	500 N⋅m (51.0 kg⋅m; 369 lb⋅ft)	-	-	48 V	9-speed automatic	4WD	2024–present (Tank 330)
Petrol hybrid	GW4N20 HEV	1,998 cc (2.0 L) I4 turbocharged Miller cycle	Engine: 180 kW (241 hp; 245 PS) @ 5,500–6,000 rpm Motor: 78 kW (105 hp; 106 PS)	Engine: 380 N⋅m (38.7 kg⋅m; 280 lb⋅ft) @ 1,700–4,000 rpm Motor: 268 N⋅m (27.3 kg⋅m; 198 lb⋅ft)	258 kW (346 hp; 351 PS) / 615 N⋅m (62.7 kg⋅m; 454 lb⋅ft)	TZ290XH003 3-in-1 motor drive system	1.75 kWh lithium-ion	9-speed 9HAT automatic	4WD	2022–present
Diesel	GW4D24	2,370 cc (2.4 L) I4 turbocharged	135 kW (181 hp; 184 PS) @ 3,600 rpm	480 N⋅m (48.9 kg⋅m; 354 lb⋅ft) @ 1,500–2,500 rpm	-	-	-	9-speed automatic	4WD RWD	2025–present

=== Exports ===
The Tank brand was destined for export markets since mid-2021.

==== Asia ====
===== Indonesia =====
The Tank 300 made its Indonesian debut in July 2024 at the 31st Gaikindo Indonesia International Auto Show alongside the Jolion, with deliveries commenced in the final quarter of 2024. It comes in a sole variant and powered by a 2.0-litre HEV turbocharged petrol hybrid. The 2.4-litre turbocharged diesel engine, with the option between two-wheel drive and four-wheel drive, was added in July 2025.

===== Malaysia =====
The Tank 300 was launched in Malaysia on 12 July 2024, after being previewed in March 2024 and later in May at the Malaysia Autoshow alongside the Haval H6. It comes in a sole variant powered by a 2.0-litre turbocharged petrol engine. In May 2026, the 2.0-litre HEV turbocharged petrol hybrid was introduced in Malaysia in the sole variant.

===== Philippines =====
GWM previewed the Tank 300 in the Philippines in October 2023 and was officially launch on 15 December 2023. It comes in a sole variant powered by a 2.0-litre turbocharged petrol engine.

===== Thailand =====
The Tank 300 was launched in Thailand on 28 September 2023, it is available in two trim levels: Pro and Ultra; it is powered by a 2.0-litre HEV turbocharged petrol hybrid. In March 2025, the 2.4-litre turbocharged diesel engine was added for the Pro and Ultra trims and the HEV Pro variant was discontinued. In March 2026, the Forest Phantom Limited Edition model using the 2.4-litre turbocharged diesel engine was made available limited to 300 units.

==== Australia ====
The Tank 300 went on sale in Australia in December 2022, with two trim levels: Lux and Ultra, it is powered by a 2.0-litre HEV turbocharged petrol hybrid. The non-hybrid 2.0-litre turbocharged petrol engine was added in May 2023. The 2.4-litre turbocharged diesel engine was added in February 2025.

==== Mexico ====
The Tank 300 was launched in Mexico on 12 March 2024, in the sole Luxury variant powered by a 2.0-litre HEV turbocharged petrol hybrid.

==== Middle East ====
The Tank 300 was launched in Saudi Arabia on 6 July 2022.

==== South Africa ====
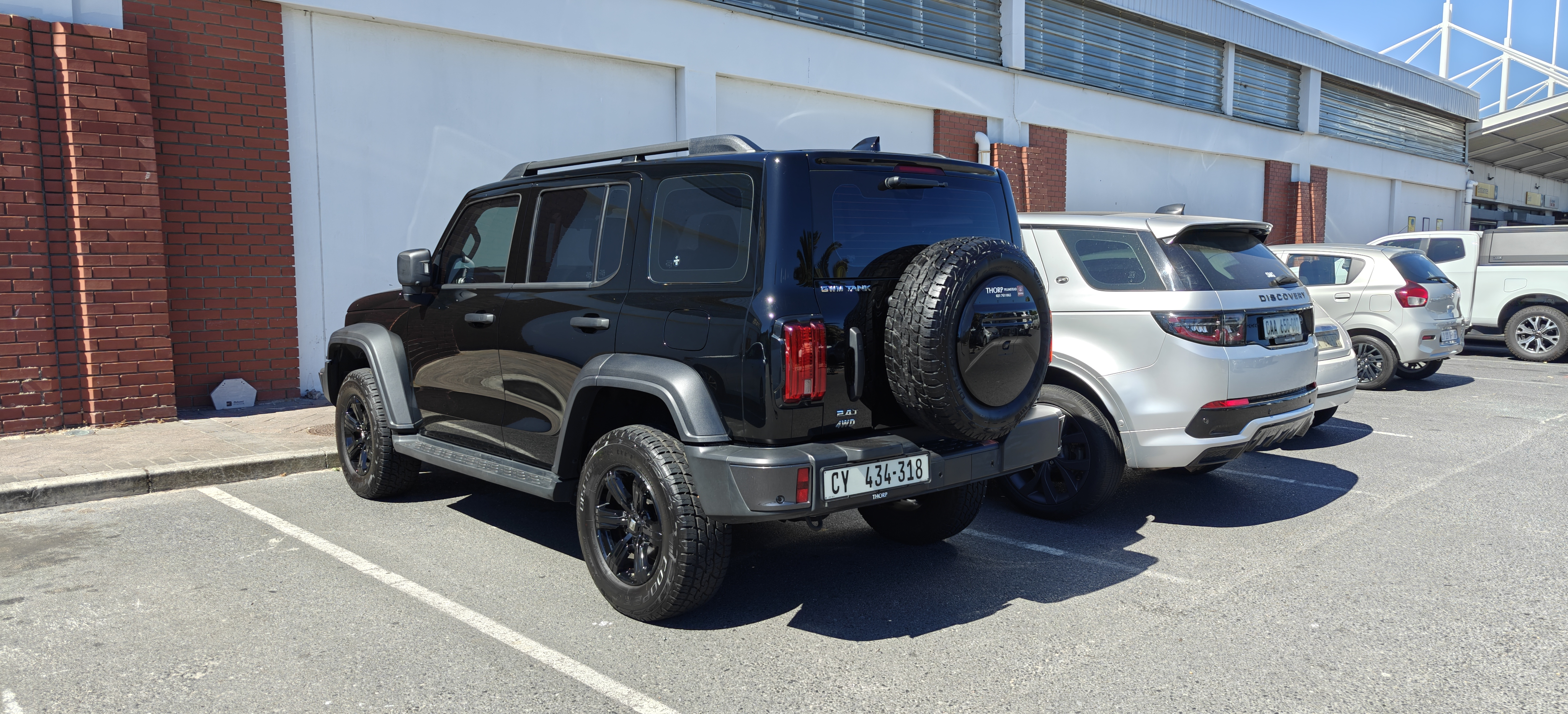
GWM Tank 300 in Kirstenhof, Cape Town

The Tank 300 was launched in South Africa on 20 February 2024, as part of the introduction of GWM's Tank sub-brand in South Africa. It comes in two trim levels: Super Luxury and Ultra Luxury; powered by either a 2.0-litre turbocharged petrol and 2.0-litre HEV turbocharged petrol hybrid engines. The 2.4-litre turbocharged diesel engine was added in February 2025. The entry-level Luxury trim powered by the 2.4-litre turbocharged diesel engine was added in August 2025.

=== Safety ===
ANCAP test results GWM Tank 300 (2022, aligned with Euro NCAP)
Test	Points	%
Overall:	5 /5 stars	
Adult occupant:	33.74	88%
Child occupant:	43.81	89%
Pedestrian:	43.85	81%
Safety assist:	13.60	85%

== Second generation (300L, 2026) ==
Tank 300L
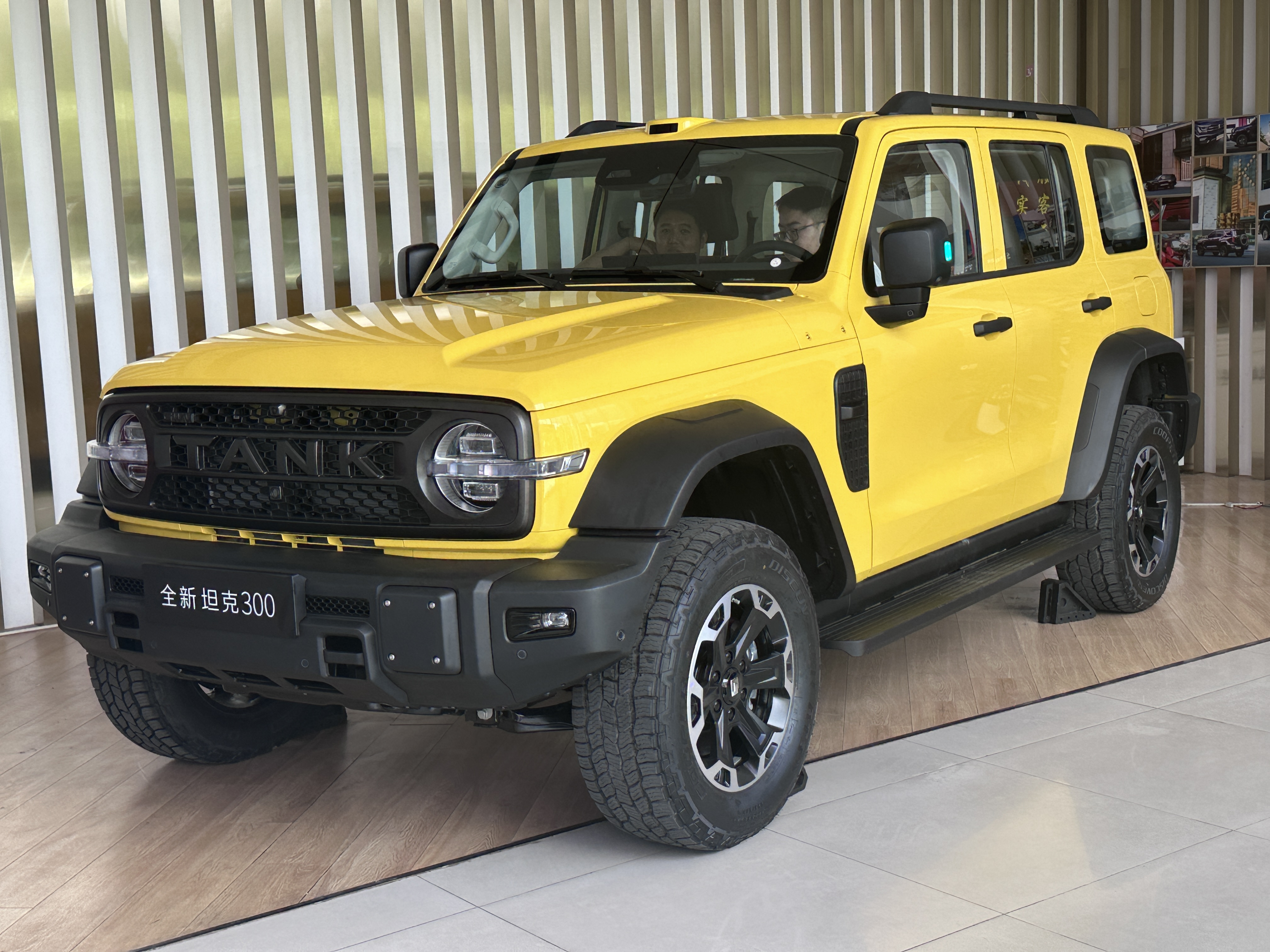
- Second generation Tank 300 (300L)

Overview
- Production: 2026–present
- Assembly: China: Chongqing

Body and chassis
- Class: Mid-size SUV
- Body style: 5-door SUV
- Layout: Front-engine, rear-wheel-drive; Front-engine, four-wheel-drive
- Platform: GWM Tank
- Chassis: Ladder frame

Powertrain
- Engine: Petrol: 2.0 L GW4C20NT/E20NB turbo I4
- Hybrid drivetrain: Power-split
- Battery: 37.1 kWh NMC SVOLT; 59.6 kWh NMC SVOLT
- Electric range: 105 km (65 mi) (Hi4-T, WLTP); 200 km (124 mi) (Hi4-Z, WLTP)

Dimensions
- Wheelbase: 3,010 mm (118.5 in)
- Length: 4,886 mm (192.4 in)
- Width: 1,984 mm (78.1 in)
- Height: 1,927 mm (75.9 in)
- Curb weight: 2,685 kg (5,919 lb) (Hi4-T); 2,890 kg (6,371 lb) (Hi4-Z)

The second generation Tank 300, dubbed the 300L was previewed by the Tank 300 Hooke Edition prototype unveiled during Auto Shanghai 2025. Presales of the 300L started in July 2026 with the Hi4-T PHEV and internal combustion engine (ICE) versions offered, and a newly added Hi4-Z PHEV variant with an electronically controlled four-wheel drive system being the volume seller during pre-sale stage. The extended dash to axle length also offers the space for the solid front axle suspension version that would be launched shortly after. It has 235 mm (9.3 in) of ground clearance approach and departure angles of 19° and 33°, respectively, and a wading depth of 800 mm (31.5 in).

=== Powertrain ===
Both the Hi4-T and Hi4-Z variants use the same longitudinally-mounted 2.0-liter turbocharged inline-4 petrol engine which outputs 241 horsepower (180 kW; 244 PS) (248 hp (185 kW; 251 PS) gross power) at 6,000rpm and 385 N⋅m (284 lb⋅ft) of torque from 1,700–4,000rpm.

==== Hi4-T ====
The Hi4-T pairs the engine with a 9-speed automatic transmission and adds a permanent magnet synchronous motor outputting 174 hp (130 kW; 176 PS) and 495 N⋅m (365 lb⋅ft) of torque, for a total system output of 416 hp (310 kW; 422 PS) and 750 N⋅m (553 lb⋅ft) of torque. It uses a 37.1kWh NMC battery which provides 105 kilometres (65 mi) of WLTP electric range; it is located in the trunk to accommodate the center locking differential and front and rear driveshafts of its mechanically-connected four-wheel-drive system. It can be recharged from 30–80% in 16 minutes.

==== Hi4-Z ====
The Hi4-Z pairs the engine with a 3-speed dedicated hybrid transmission and a motor rated at 242 hp (180 kW; 245 PS) and 400 N⋅m (295 lb⋅ft) of torque which exclusively drive the front wheels. It is supplemented by a rear motor outputting 268 hp (200 kW; 272 PS) and 415 N⋅m (306 lb⋅ft) of torque, for a total system output of 751 hp (560 kW; 761 PS) and 1,195 N⋅m (881 lb⋅ft) of torque. It has a 59.6 kWh NMC battery mounted under the cabin between the axles which provides 200 kilometres (124 mi) of WLTP electric range. It can be recharged from 30–80% in 16 minutes.

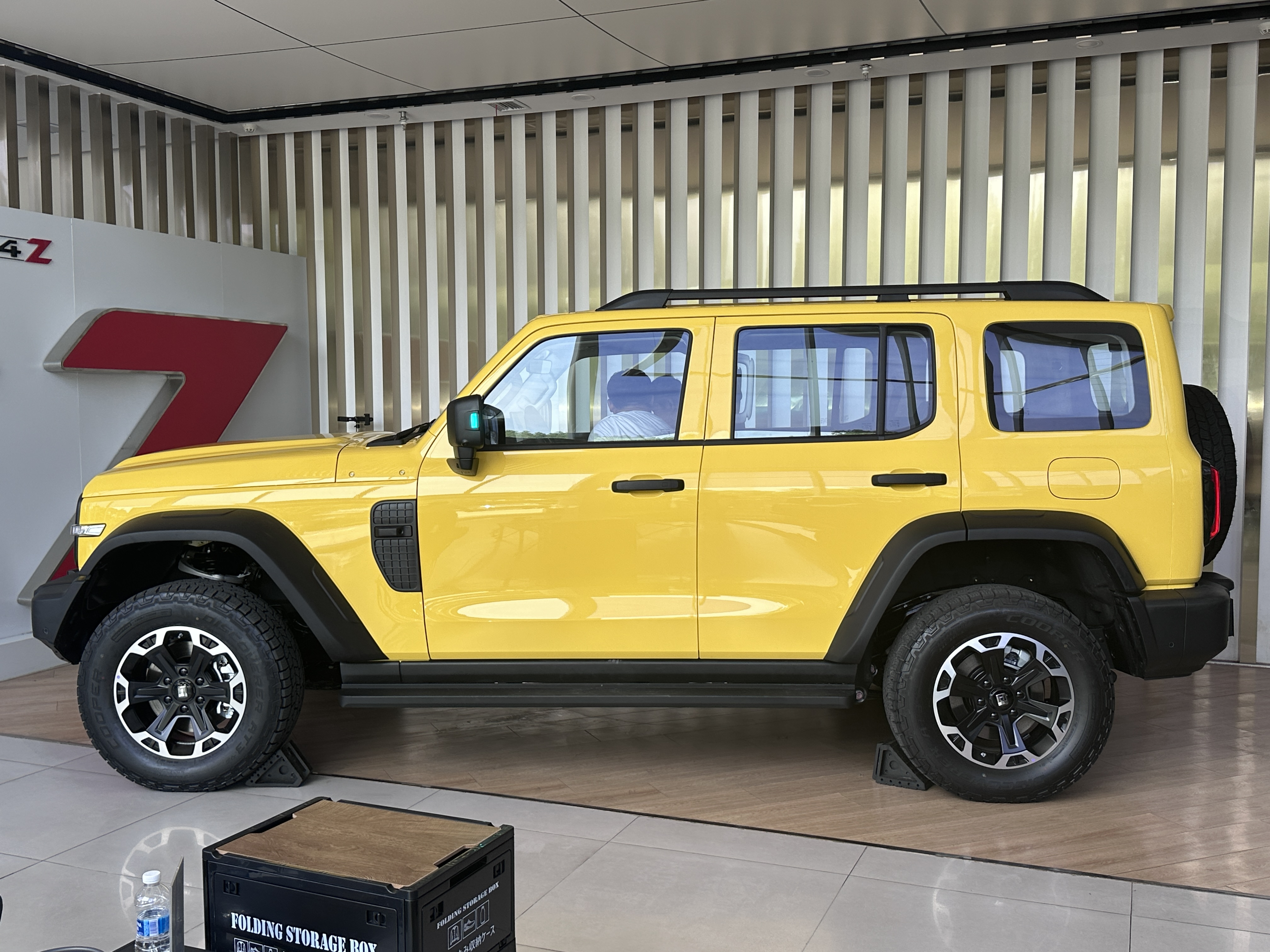
Second generation Tank 300 featuring a significantly longer dash to axle

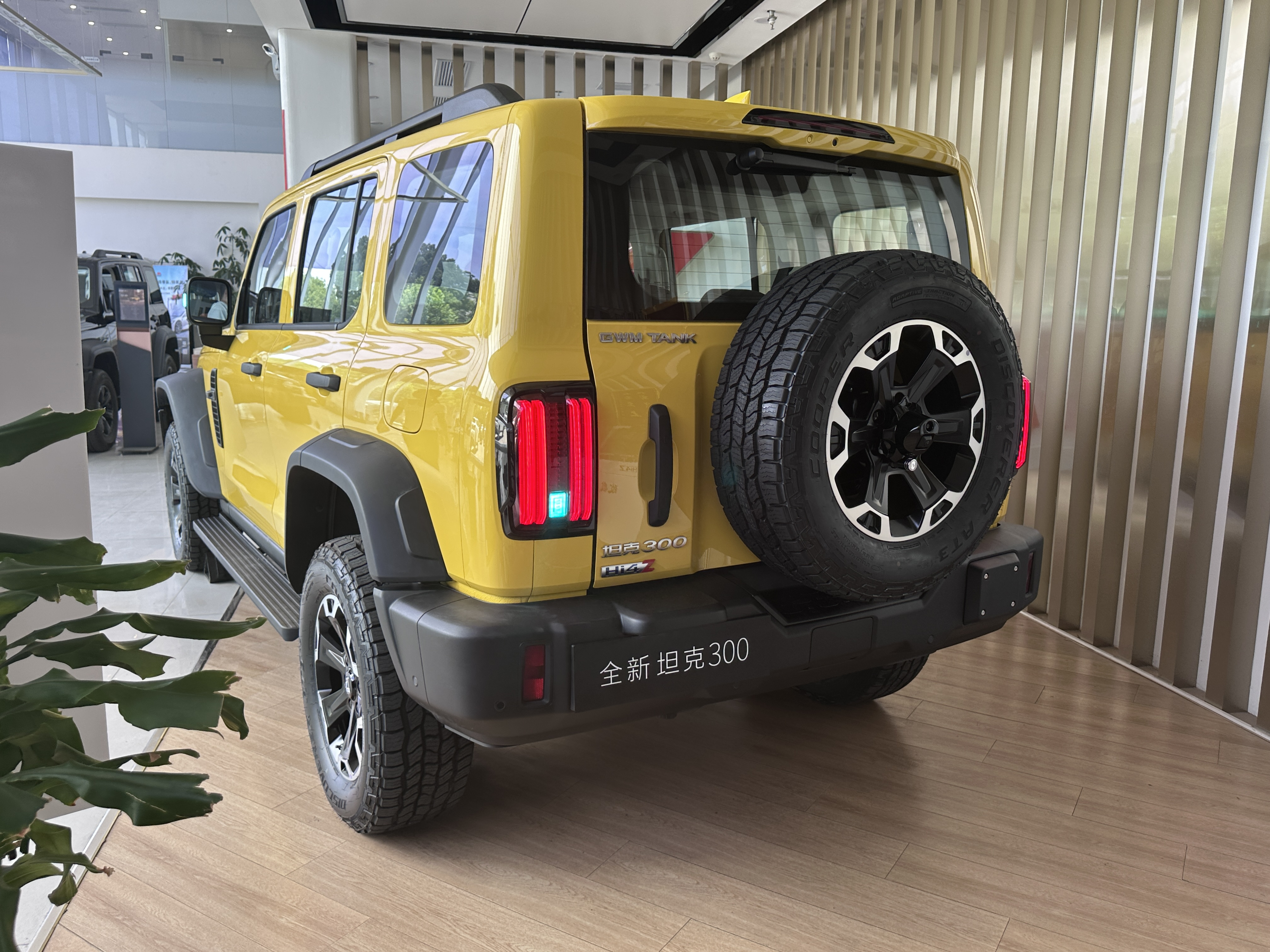
Rear

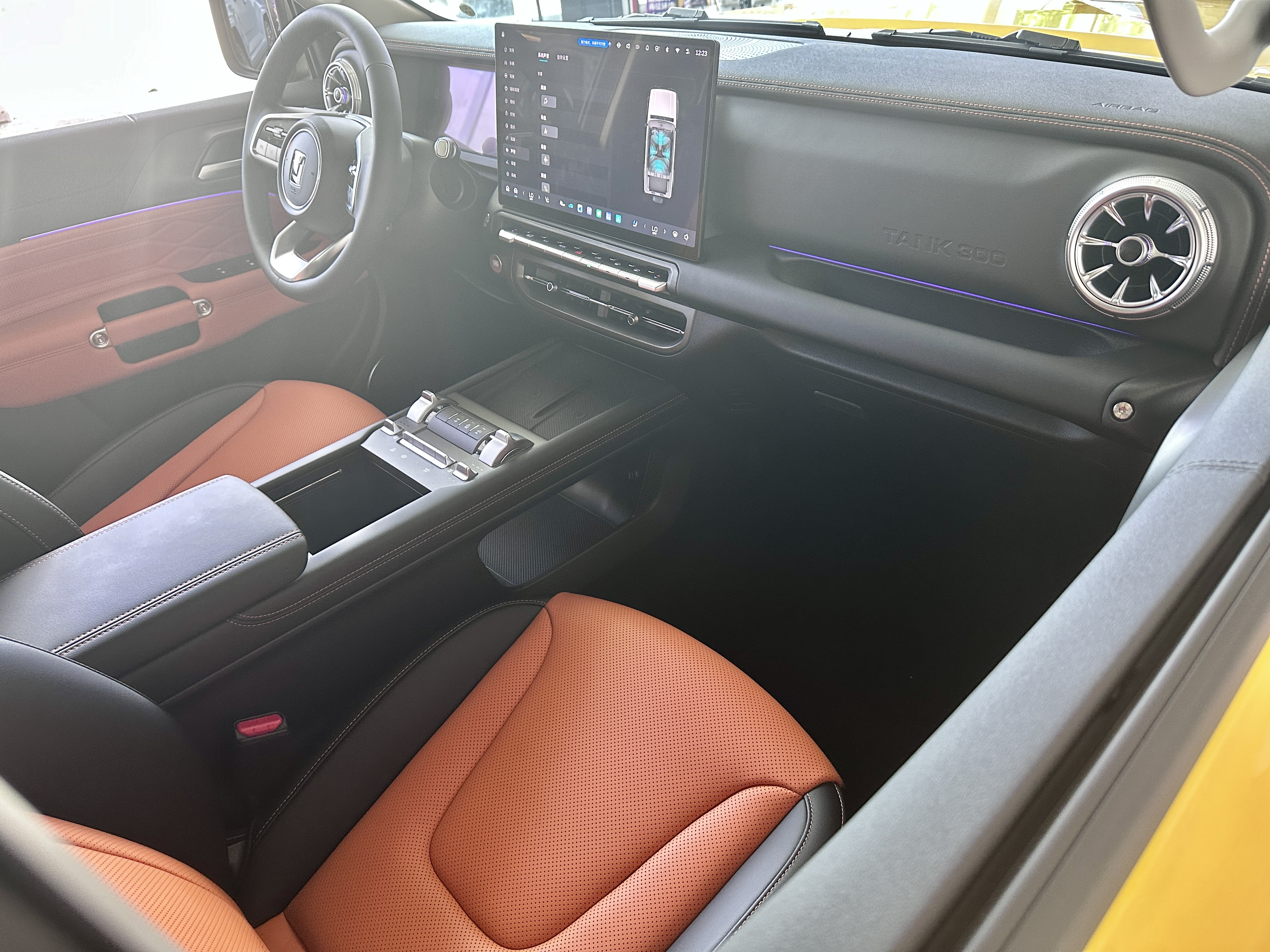
Interior

== Sales ==
Year	China			Russia	Australia	Thailand	Malaysia (Note: Figures based on registration (Malaysia))	Indonesia		Mexico	Brazil
Year	300	300 Hi4	Total	Russia	Australia	Thailand	Malaysia	HEV	Diesel	Mexico	Brazil
2021		—	84,588					—	—	—	
2022		—	101,873					—	—	—	
2023	95,728	—	95,728	6,774		508		—	—	—	
2024	73,290	2,557	75,847	16,258	3,968	606	482	251	—		1,077
2025	50,810	26,123	76,933					241	592	846	3,515

== See also ==
- GWM Tank
