= GWM Cannon =

Mid-size pickup truck

Great Wall Pao
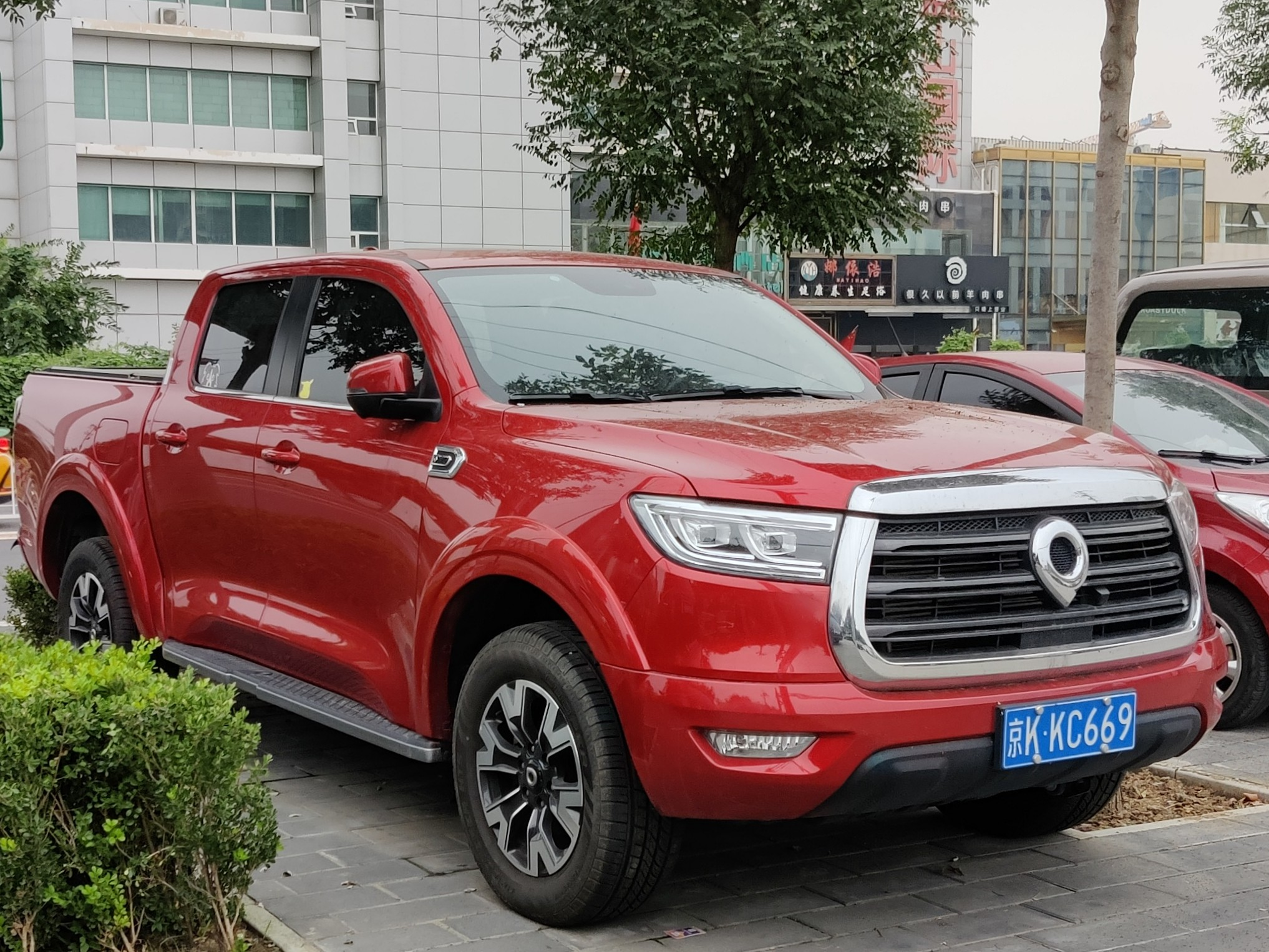
- 2023 Great Wall Poer

Overview
- Manufacturer: Great Wall Motor
- Also called: GWM Poer; GWM Poer P30 (Brazil); GWM P-Series (South Africa); GWM Cannon; GWM Ute (Australia, New Zealand); GWM Poer Ruman and Sucan (Brunei); GWM Poer Sahar (Thailand)
- Production: 2019–present
- Assembly: China: Baoding; Brazil: Iracemapolis

Body and chassis
- Class: Mid-size pickup truck
- Body style: 2-door single cab; 4-door extended cab; 4-door double cab
- Layout: Front-engine, rear-wheel drive; Front-engine, four-wheel drive; Rear-motor, rear-wheel drive (EV)
- Related: Tank 300

Powertrain
- Engine: Petrol: 2.0 L GW4C20B I4 turbo; Diesel: 2.0 L GW4D20M I4 turbodiesel; 2.4 L GW4D24 I4 turbodiesel; Petrol hybrid; 2.0 L GW4N20 HEV I4 turbo
- Electric motor: Permanent magnet synchronous motor (EV); TZ290XH003 3-in-1 motor drive system (HEV)
- Power output: 147 kW (197 hp; 200 PS) (2.0 petrol); 120 kW (160 hp; 160 PS) (2.0 diesel); 150 kW (200 hp; 200 PS) (EV); 258 kW (346 hp; 351 PS) (HEV)
- Transmission: 6-speed manual 8-speed ZF 8HP automatic 1-speed direct-drive (EV); 9-speed 9HAT automatic (HEV)
- Hybrid drivetrain: Power Split Hybrid (HEV)
- Battery: Li-ion battery (EV)
- Electric range: 405 km (252 mi) (EV)

Dimensions
- Wheelbase: Regular version: 3,230 mm (127 in); Commercial version: 3,230 mm (127 in); Commercial LWB version: 3,410 mm (134 in)
- Length: Regular version: 5,410 mm (213 in); Commercial version: 5,362 mm (211 in); Commercial LWB version: 5,602 mm (221 in)
- Width: Regular version: 1,934 mm (76 in); Commercial version: 1,883 mm (74 in)
- Height: Regular version: 1,886 mm (74 in); Commercial version: 1,884 mm (74 in)

The Great Wall Pao (Chinese: 長城炮; pinyin: Cháng chéng pào) (also known as the Poer P11/P12, Cannon, P-Series, Ruman, or Sucan) is a range of mid-size pickup trucks manufactured by the Chinese automaker Great Wall Motors since 2019.

== Overview ==
The Great Wall Pao debuted on 16 April 2019, during the Shanghai Auto Show. It is available in three different versions, including a standard passenger model, an off-road model, and a commercial-oriented model. An electric version was also revealed but was not available at launch.

The Great Wall Pao is built on the P71 platform of Great Wall Motors, which is also used for the Haval H9 SUV, and it is powered by a 2.0 liter turbocharged inline-four gasoline engine code-named GW4C20B, with a maximum output of 147 kW (197 hp). Four-wheel drive is optional, and the transmission is an 8-speed automatic gearbox or a 6-speed manual. The standard cargo bed is sized 1,520mm x 1,520mm x 538mm.

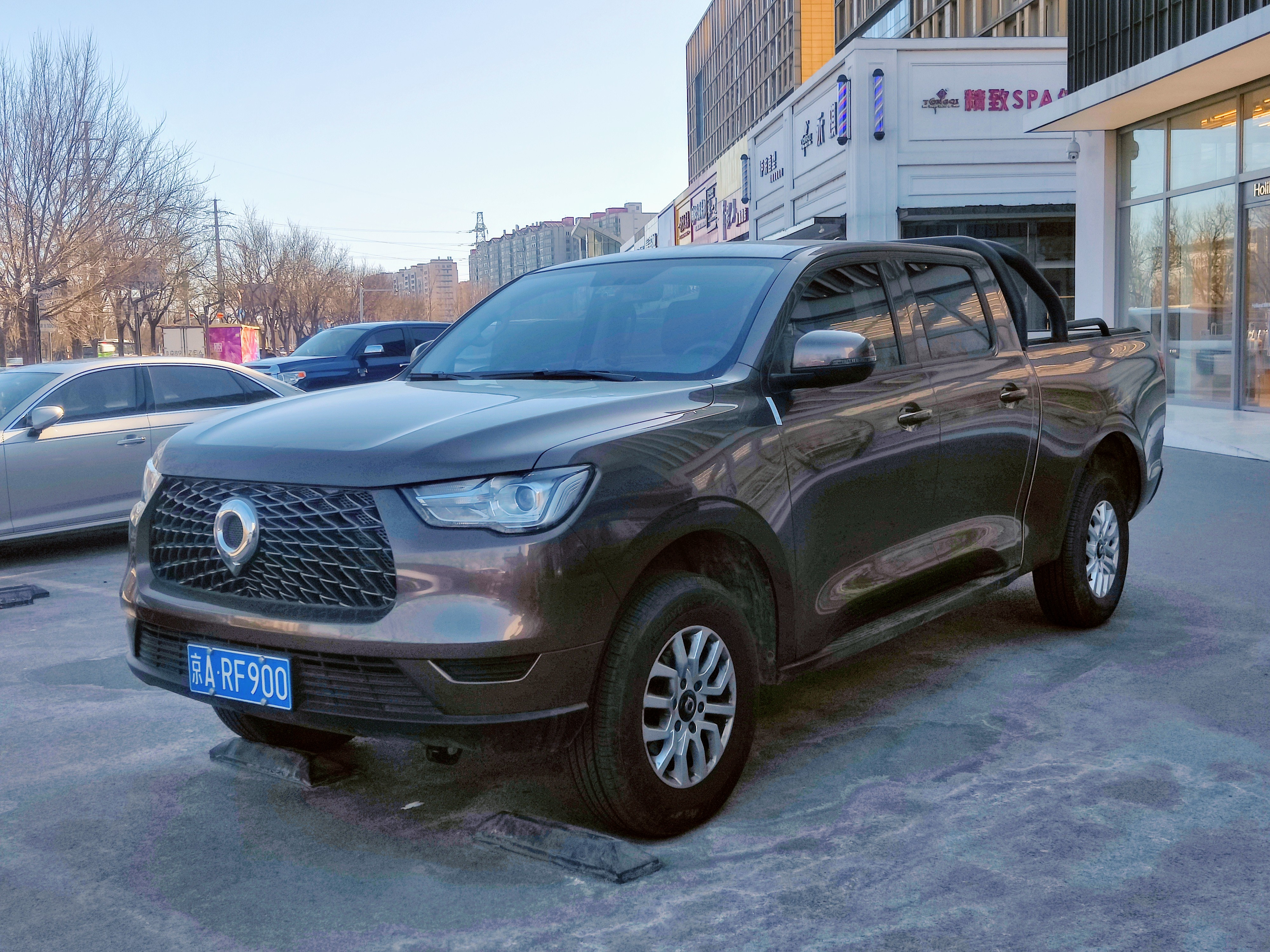
Great Wall Pao base trim (front)

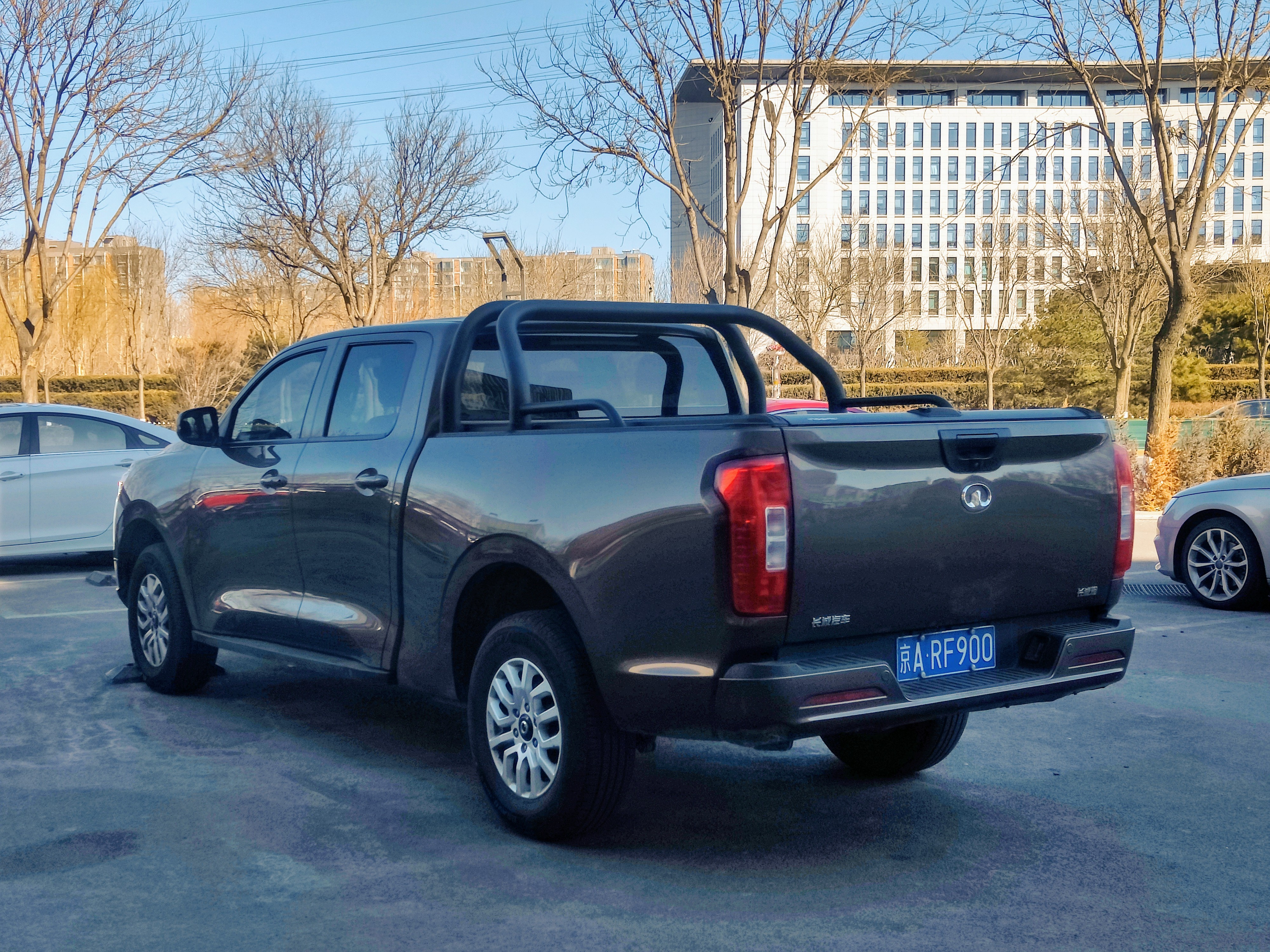
Great Wall Pao base trim (back)
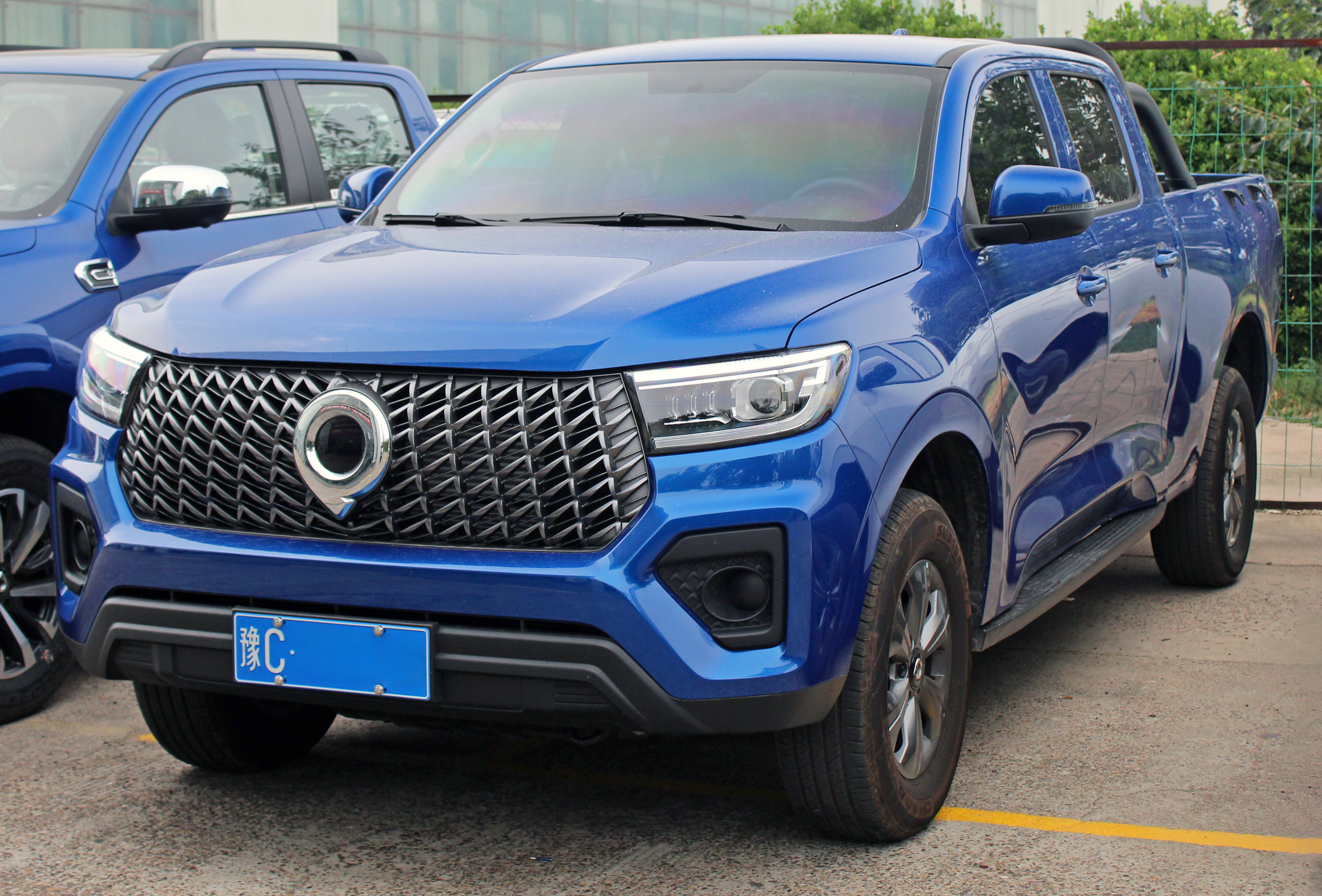
Pao Commercial Edition

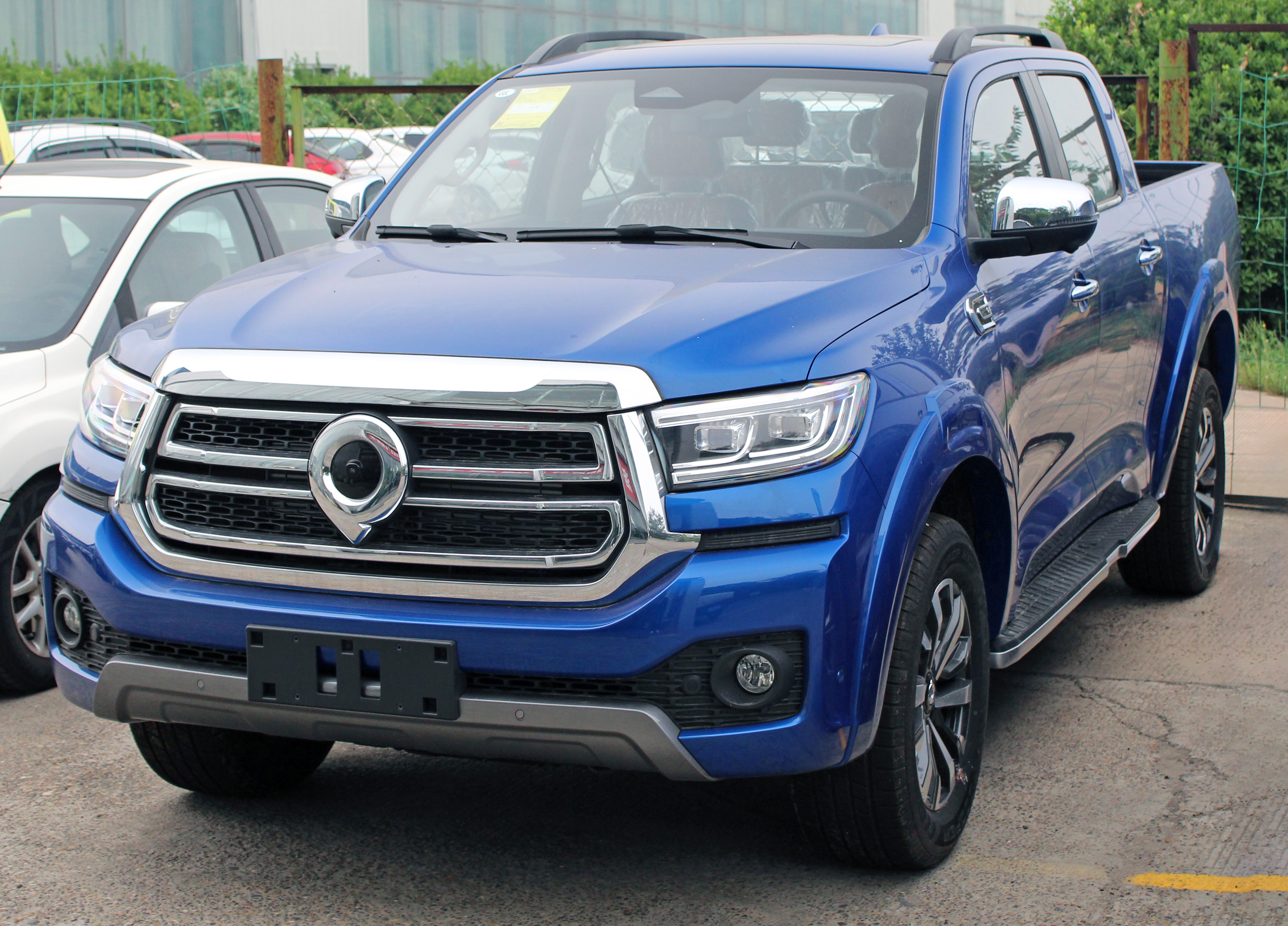
Pao Passenger Edition (facelift)

== Pao EV ==
On 26 September 2020, Great Wall Motor announced an electric version of the Pao, equipped with a 150 kW (201 hp) 300 N⋅m (221 lb⋅ft) electric motor; reported range was up to 405 km.

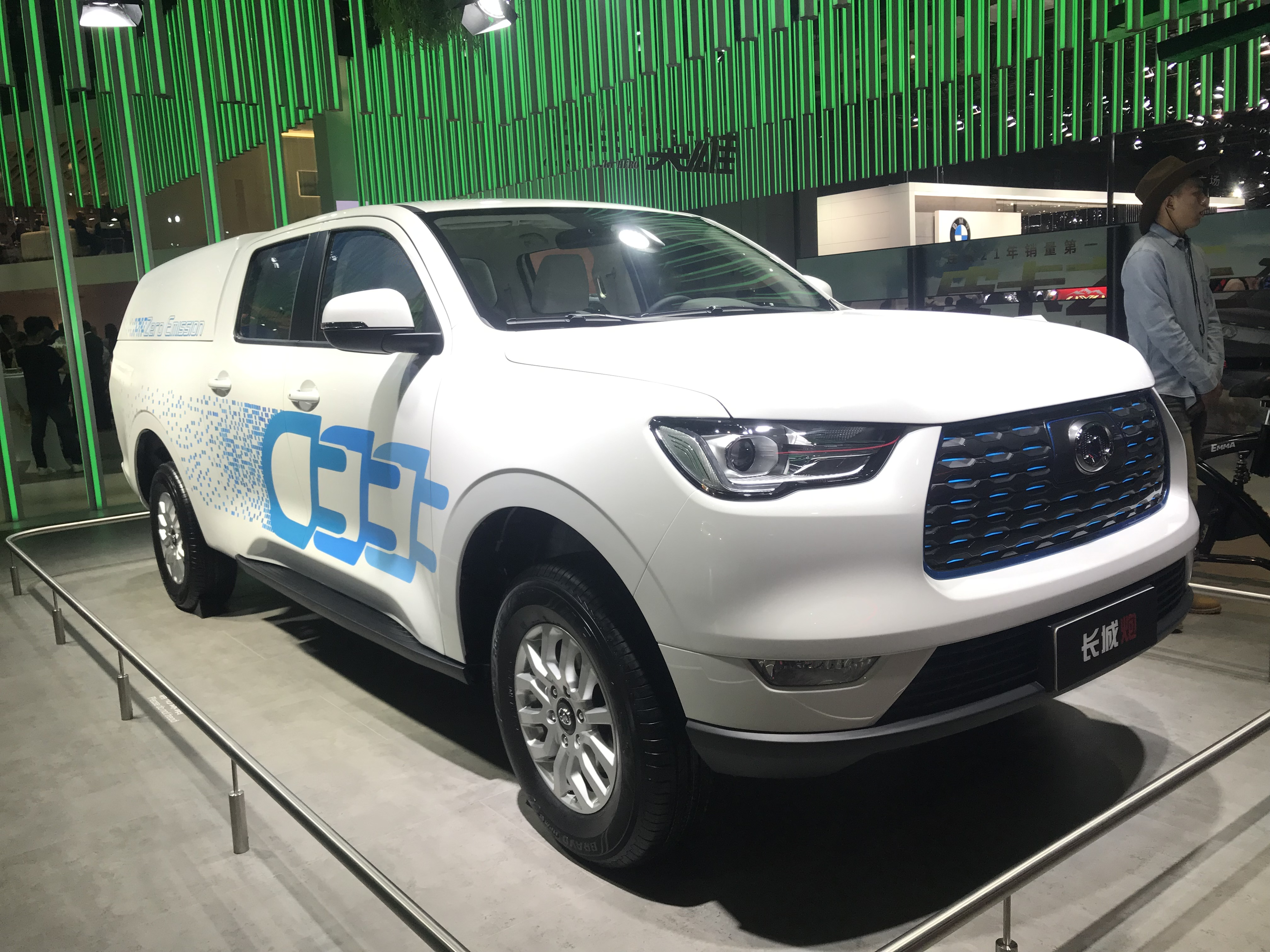
Great Wall Pao EV (front)

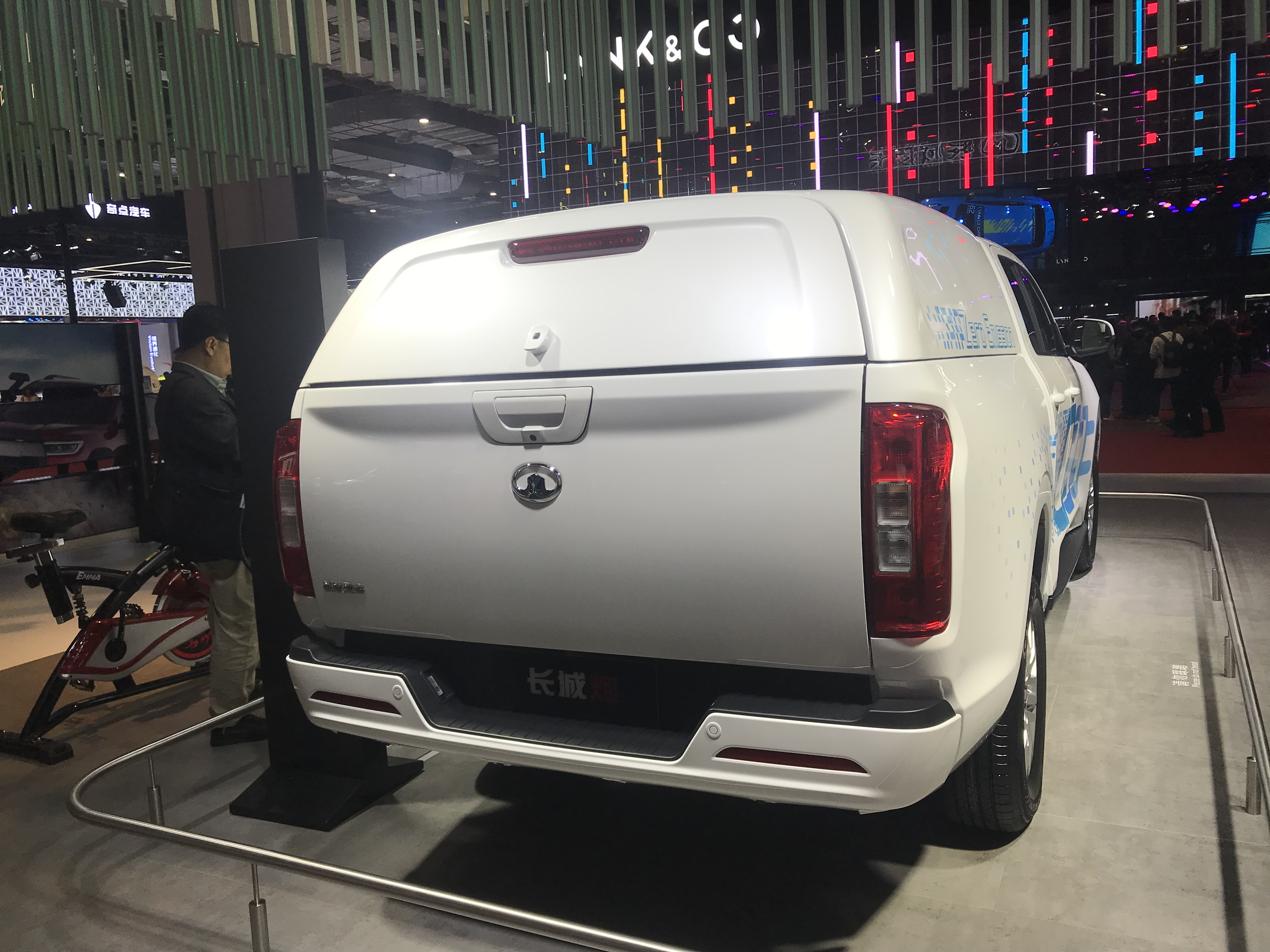
Great Wall Pao EV (back)

== Safety ==
ANCAP test results GWM Ute (2021, aligned with Euro NCAP)
Test	Points	%
Overall:	5 /5 stars	
Adult occupant:	32.74	86%
Child occupant:	43.03	87%
Pedestrian:	36.48	67%
Safety assist:	11.76	73%

ANCAP test results GWM Cannon (2021, aligned with Euro NCAP)
Test	Points	%
Overall:	5 /5 stars	
Adult occupant:	32.74	86%
Child occupant:	43.03	87%
Pedestrian:	36.48	67%
Safety assist:	11.26	70%

== Markets ==
=== Africa ===
==== South Africa ====
In October 2020, Haval South Africa announced that a version of the Pao, badged as the GWM P-Series, would be launched in the country as an eventual replacement for the Great Wall Steed. It was made available in three versions: the Commercial Single Cab, the Commercial Double Cab, and the Passenger Double Cab.

=== Asia ===
==== Brunei ====
In December 2021, GWM's distributor in Brunei, Berjaya Sdn Bhd, launched a version of the Pao Passenger and Commercial, badged as GWM Poer Ruman and GWM Poer Sucan, respectively. Poer is a sub-brand that stands for 'Powerful, Off-road, Enjoyable, and Reliable'.

On 16 September 2023, Berjaya Sdn Bhd launched a new version of the Poer Ruman, called Poer Ruman Ore.

==== Malaysia ====
Great Wall Motor Sales Malaysia launched two pickup trucks under the GWM Poer name, with the Poer P12 being a version of the Australian GWM Cannon Ute and the Ruman, and the Poer P11 being the equivalent of the Sucan model.

=== Oceania ===
==== Australia and New Zealand ====
In October 2020, GWM Australia announced that a version of the Pao badged as the GWM Ute (Note: The word ute being an Australian term for coupe utility and pickup truck.) would be launched in the country as a replacement for the Great Wall Steed. It was the first vehicle sold under the rebranded GWM name, and it was made available in three dual-cab versions: the Cannon, the Cannon-L, and the top-of-the-range Cannon-X. GWM New Zealand also sold the model under the same badging.

It was renamed the GWM Cannon in 2025, as part of the facelift, also adding the 2.4-litre GW4D24 diesel inline-four engine from the GWM Cannon Alpha to the range.

== Sales ==
Year	Australia	Mexico
2024		2,717
2025	7,800	3,951
