= Raymond Beresford Poer =

Raymond Beresford Poer was Dean of Ross from 1946 to 1968.

Poer was educated at Trinity College, Dublin; and ordained in 1918. After a curacy in Portlaw he held incumbencies at Cork (1922–27), Kinsale (1927–46) and Rathbarry (1946–68). He was also a prebendary of Cork Cathedral.
