= Beer O'Clock Hill =

Hill in Queensland, Australia

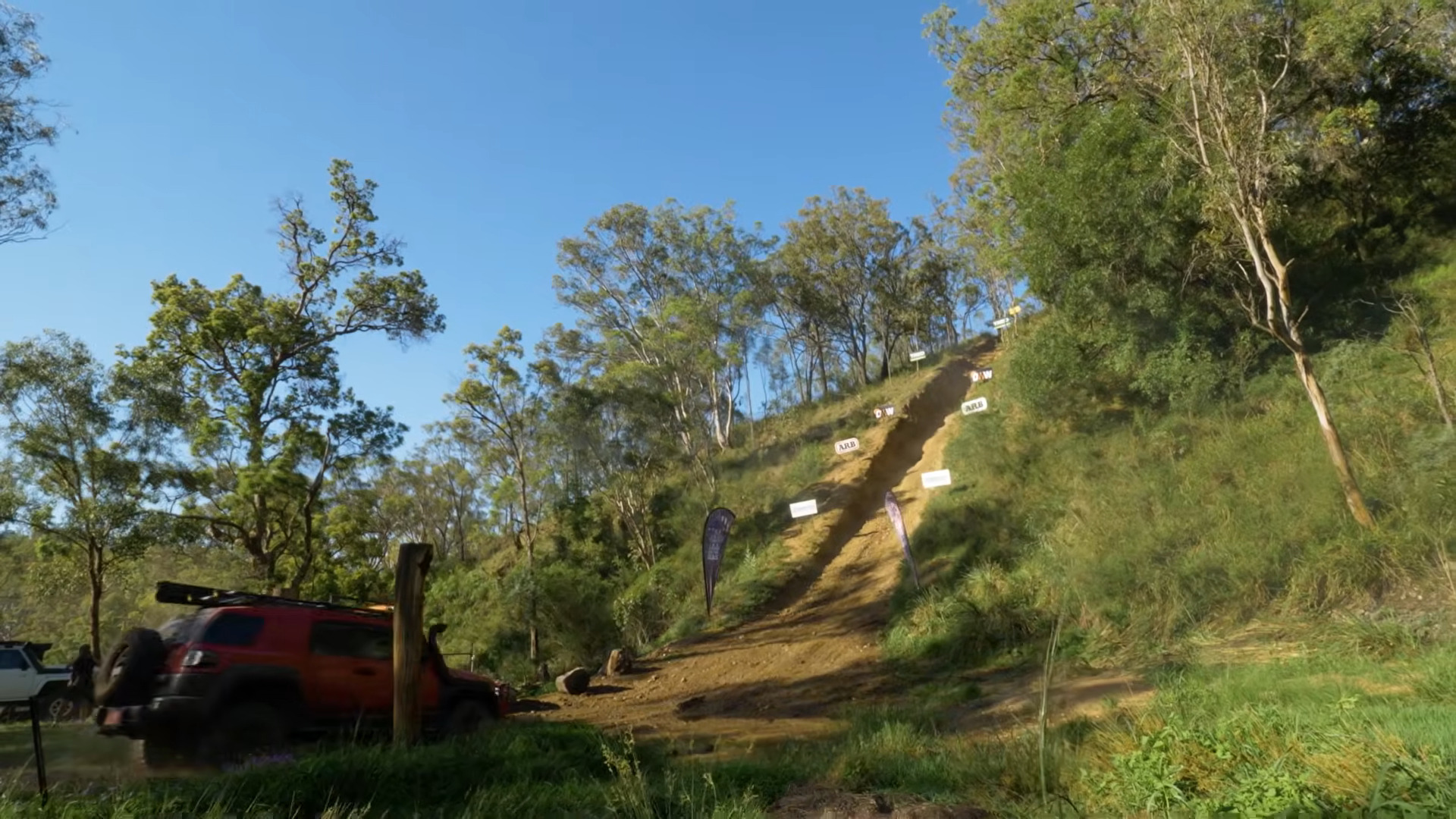
- A Toyota FJ Cruiser beginning a climb up the hill

Highest point
- Coordinates: 28°22′30.19″S 151°56′14.91″E

Geography
- Location within Queensland
- Country: Australia
- State: Queensland
- Region: Darling Downs

Beer O'Clock Hill is a steep off-road hill climb at The Springs 4×4 Adventure Park in The Glen, Queensland, Australia, about 25 kilometres (16 mi) south of Warwick in the Southern Downs Region. The rutted, rocky track is about 100 metres (350 ft) long, with a slope of about 55 degrees at its steepest point, and is regarded as one of the most difficult off-road hill climbs in Australia. Since 2025 several vehicle manufacturers have used the hill to demonstrate the off-road capability of production four-wheel drive vehicles.

== Description ==
Beer O'Clock Hill has a deeply rutted and rocky shale hill climb of about 100 metres (350 ft), with a 55-degree slope at its steepest point. The track lies within the main camping area of the park and campers are able to climb Beer O'Clock hill at 4:00 p.m. on Saturdays, with the park owners present. It is a popular challenge for off-road vehicles, and has a reputation for defeating and damaging heavily modified four-wheel drive vehicles.

== The Springs 4×4 Adventure Park ==
The Springs 4×4 Adventure Park is a 665-hectare (1,640-acre) off-roading park on the New England Highway in the Granite Belt region, about 25 kilometres (16 mi) south of Warwick and 180 kilometres (110 mi) south-west of Brisbane.

Its tracks range from easy to extreme, and the park hosts the annual Ironman 4×4 Adventure Challenge. Other named hills include Bald Hill and Love Hill. The Springs 4×4 Adventure Park was put up for sale in 2025.

== Industry testing ==
From 2025 the hill became an informal proving ground for vehicle manufacturers demonstrating the off-road capability of standard production vehicles. The Ineos Grenadier was the first un-modified production vehicle to successfully climb the hill. In June 2025, GWM ran three of its models up the hill: the GWM Cannon XSR became the second production-specification vehicle to reach the top, followed by the GWM Tank 300. The first plug-in hybrid vehicle to successfully climb the hill was the GWM Cannon Alpha PHEV, the use all-terrain tyres was the only modification.

In December 2025, CarExpert tested a group of dual-cab utes on the hill, describing it as "one of the toughest industry tests for off-road vehicles".

On March 2026, a pre-production Kia Tasman X-Pro also successfully climbed the hill, also swapping to all-terrain tyres, the plug-in hybrid Denza B5 and Denza B8 both sucessuflly made the climb, modified only with all-terrain tyres and software adjustments to traction, torque and throttle calibration. Data from the climbs was sent to Denza's research and development teams in China, and in May 2026 the company released an over-the-air update (OTA Version 1.10) for both models, adding off-road and towing improvements drawn partly from the testing. Later in March, the plug-in hybrid GWM Tank 300 Hi4-T and GWM Tank 500 Hi4-T, completed the climb in full production specification on its standard highway tyres.
