= BYD Shark 6 =

Plug-in hybrid pickup truck

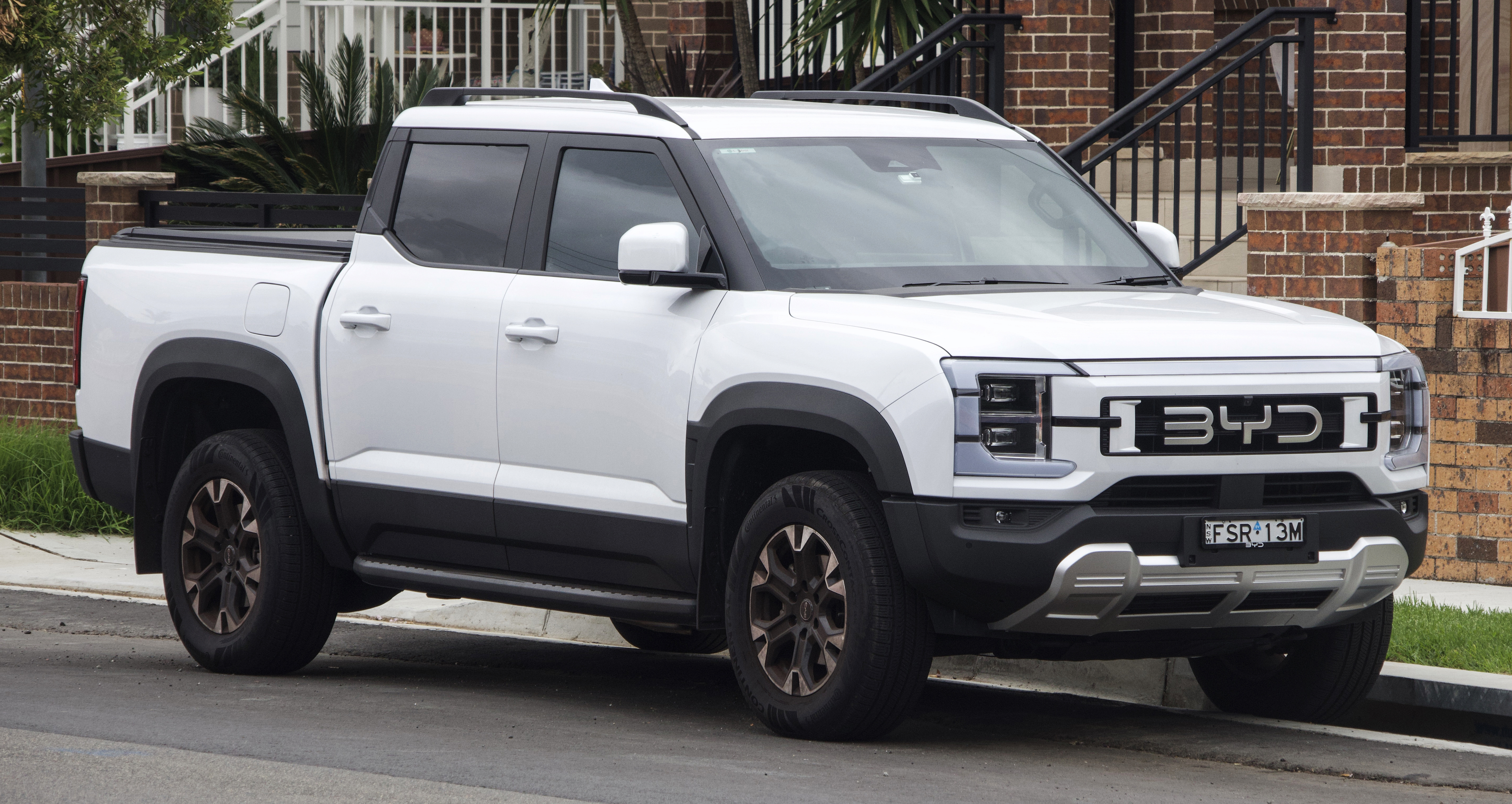

Overview
- Manufacturer: BYD Auto
- Also called: BYD Shark; Fangchengbao Shark (China)
- Production: 2024–present
- Assembly: China: Zhengzhou, Henan
- Designer: Under the lead of Wolfgang Egger (exterior); Under the lead of Michele Jauch Paganetti (interior)

Body and chassis
- Class: Mid-size pickup truck
- Body style: 4-door pickup truck; 4-door cab chassis
- Layout: Front-engine, dual-motor four-wheel-drive
- Platform: DMO Super Hybrid
- Chassis: Body-on-frame
- Related: Denza B5; Denza B8

Powertrain
- Engine: Petrol plug-in hybrid: 1.5 L BYD476ZQF turbo I4; 2.0 L BYD487ZQD turbo I4 (Performance)
- Electric motor: Permanent magnet synchronous
- Power output: 321 kW (430 hp; 436 PS); 350 kW (469 hp; 476 PS) (Performance)
- Transmission: Single Speed DMO
- Hybrid drivetrain: Plug-in hybrid
- Battery: 29.58 kWh BYD Blade LFP
- Range: 670 km (416 mi) (WLTP); 640 km (398 mi) (WLTP) (Performance)
- Electric range: 85 km (53 mi) (WLTP); 80 km (50 mi) (WLTP) (Performance)
- Plug-in charging: V2L: 6.6kW; 7 kW (AC); 55 kW (DC)

Dimensions
- Wheelbase: 3,260 mm (128.3 in)
- Length: 5,457 mm (214.8 in); 5,413 mm (213.1 in) (cab chassis)
- Width: 1,971 mm (77.6 in)
- Height: 1,925 mm (75.8 in)
- Curb weight: 2,600–2,775 kg (5,732–6,118 lb)

The BYD Shark 6 (also called the BYD Shark in some markets) is a plug-in hybrid mid-size pickup truck manufactured by the Chinese auto manufacturing company BYD Auto. The vehicle debuted in Mexico in May 2024 as the first light utility vehicle model made by BYD. It is based on a body-on-frame chassis with a Dual Mode Off-Road (DMO) hybrid drivetrain, similar to the platform used on the Denza B5.

The model will be marketed in China in 2026 under the Fangchengbao brand, as the Fangchengbao Shark (Chinese: 方程豹鲨鱼; pinyin: Fāngchéngbào Shāyú).

== History ==
In April 2024, BYD announced that it will be naming its first pickup truck the BYD Shark. The BYD Shark was first introduced in Mexico on 14 May 2024. It is the first time BYD had a vehicle global debut launch outside China, as the BYD Shark is not marketed in China. The model is produced in China at BYD Super Intelligent Factory in Zhengzhou, Henan.

The BYD Shark later expanded into other international markets. It was launched in Brazil in October 2024 as part of BYD’s broader Latin American strategy. In Australia, the model—marketed as the BYD Shark 6—became available for order on 29 October 2024, with first deliveries commencing later that year.

== Specifications ==
The pickup truck was originally powered across all models by a 1.5-litre 135 kW (181 hp; 184 PS) turbocharged petrol engine mounted longitudinally, along with two electric motors, one on each axle, the front motor is rated at 170 kW (228 hp; 231 PS), and the rear motor 150 kW (201 hp; 204 PS), creating an electric four-wheel drive layout rated at 321 kW (430 hp; 436 PS) and 650 N⋅m (479 lb⋅ft) of torque. BYD claims that it is the world's first longitudinally-mounted range-extender hybrid layout. It uses BYD's proprietary LFP blade battery with a capacity of 29.58 kWh installed with a cell-to-chassis technology mounted under the floor, for an electric-only range of 85 km using the WLTP cycle and 670 km combined. It is able to be charged on a fast DC charger at a rate of up to 55 kW.

DC to DC converter steps 364.7 volt (from 29.58 kWh battery) down to 12 volt. The converter is rated for 13.8 volts at 220 amps, this can be used to run 12000lb winch, as competitors such as Toyota Hilux 2.8L diesel only has 80 amp output at 12 volts.

The claimed 0-100 km/h acceleration time is 5.7 seconds, and the fuel consumption is claimed to be 7.5 L/100 km (13.3 km/l; 31.4 mpg_{‑US}). It has a braked towing capacity of 2,500 kg (5,510 lb), a 790 kg (1,740 lb) or 835 kg (1,840 lb) payload and 1,450 L (51 cu ft) cargo volume.

The Performance variant, first released in April 2026 in Australia, is powered by a 2.0-litre turbocharged petrol engine and two electric motors, producing a combined 350 kW (469 hp; 476 PS) and 700 N⋅m (516 lb⋅ft) of torque. It has a faster claimed 0-100km/h acceleration time of 5.5 seconds, and an increased braked towing capacity to 3,500 kg (7,716 lb).

The Dynamic variant is a cab chassis designed specifically for the Australian market.

The BYD Shark uses a coil spring double wishbone independent rear suspension instead of leaf spring commonly used by its competitors in the mid-size segment. It has a claimed unladen ground clearance figure of 230 mm (9.1 in). The approach angle is at 31 degrees, while the ramp over and departure angle are 17 degrees and 19 degrees respectively.

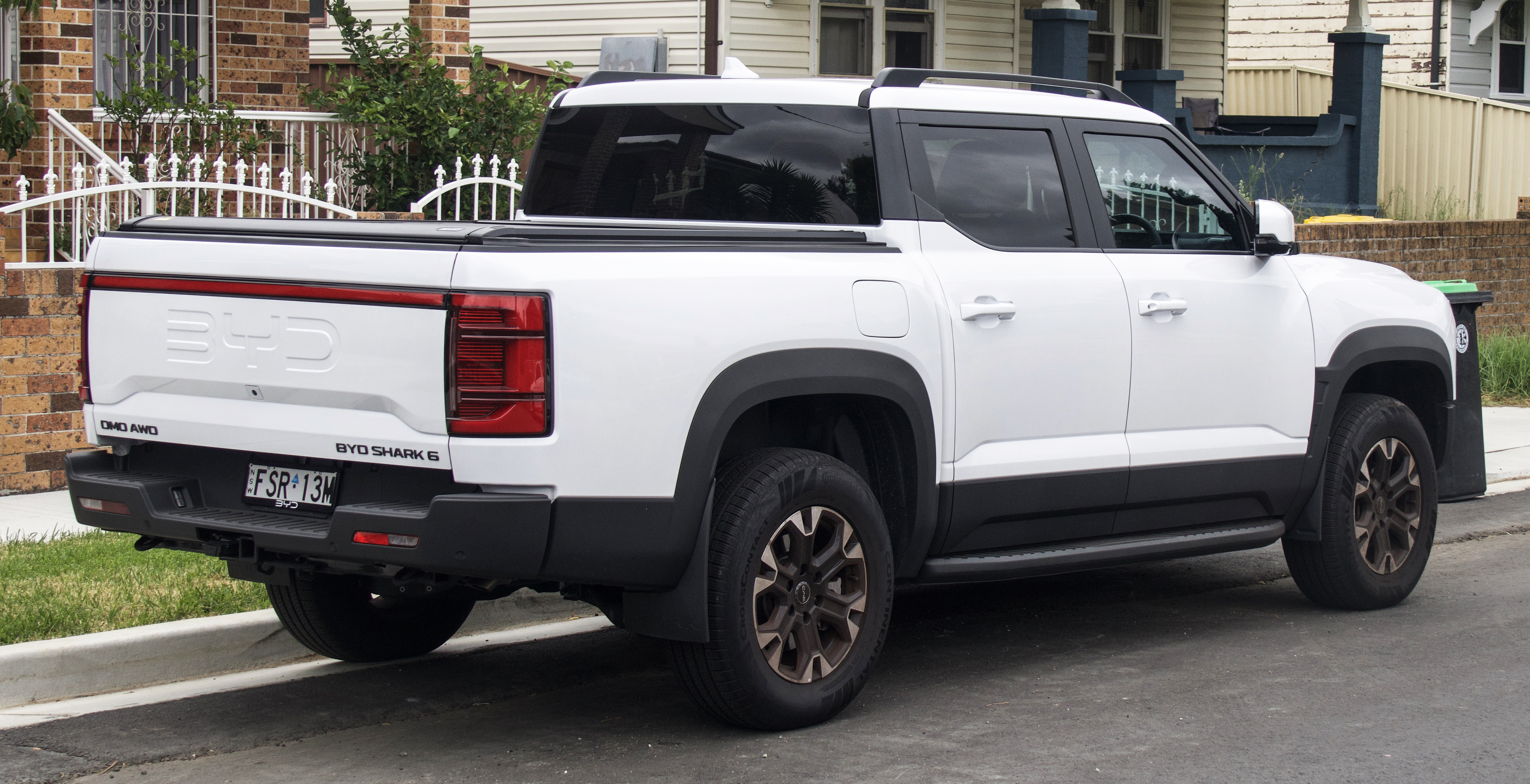
Rear view

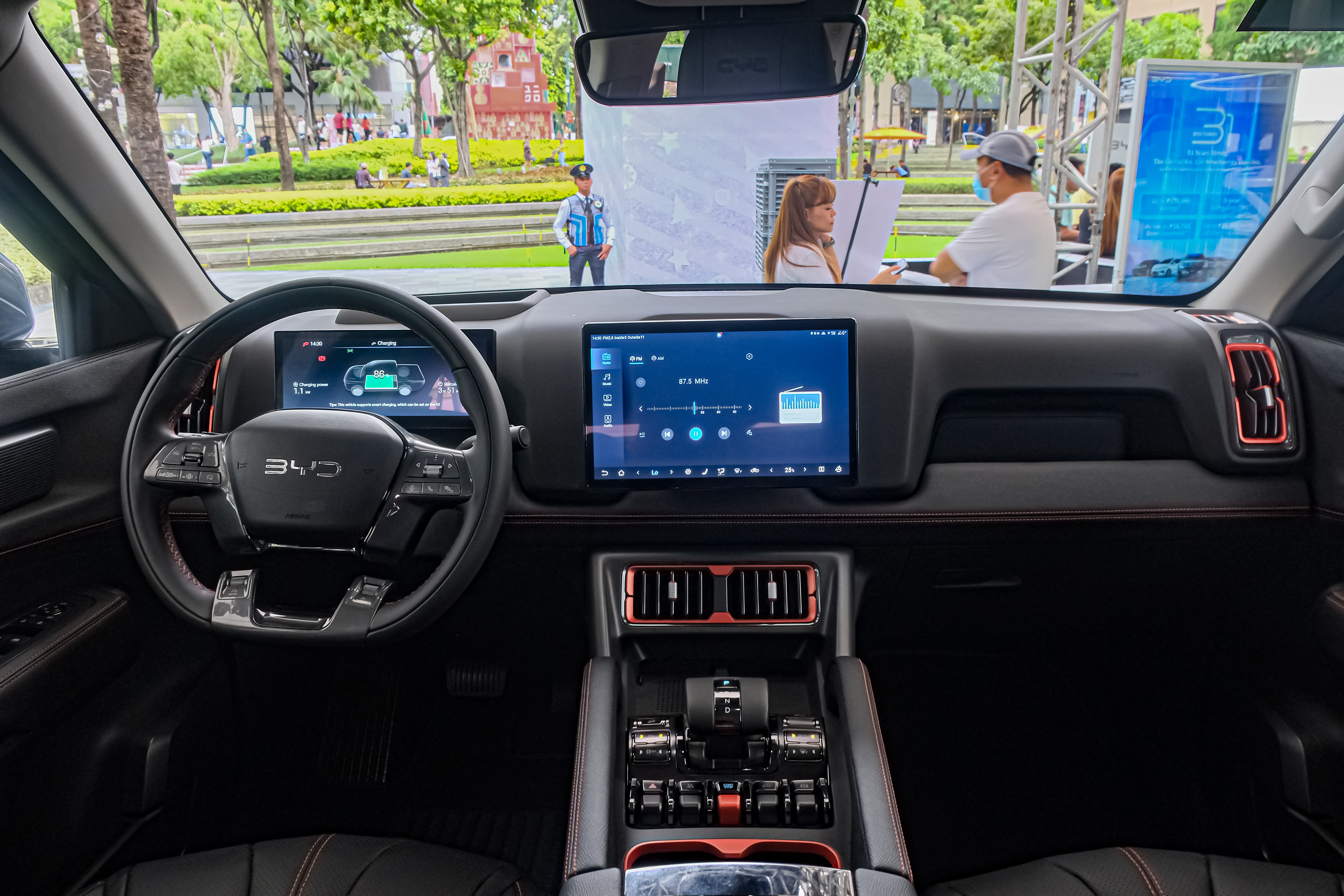
Interior

== Equipment ==
The cabin of the BYD Shark came equipped with full synthetic leather interior trimmings, a 12.8-inch or 15.6-inch touchscreen infotainment with rotating screen feature, a 10.25-inch digital instrument cluster, and a 12-speaker Dynaudio-branded premium audio system, although in Latin America it is sold with a basic 8 speaker system without subwoofer.

== Markets ==
=== Africa ===
==== South Africa ====
The vehicle is marketed in South Africa as the BYD Shark 6. It went on sale in South Africa on 4 April 2025 in the sole Premium variant. At the time of its introduction, it became the most powerful pick-up truck on sale in South Africa. In July 2026, the Performance variant was added to the line-up.

=== Asia ===
==== Brunei ====
The vehicle is marketed in Brunei as the BYD Shark 6. It was introduced on 21 June 2025 in a single variant.

==== Laos ====
The vehicle is marketed in Laos as the BYD Shark 6. It was introduced in late November 2024 in a single variant.

==== Philippines ====
The vehicle is marketed in the Philippines as the BYD Shark 6. It went on sale in the Philippines on 7 March 2025 in two trim levels: Advanced and Premium.

==== Pakistan ====
The vehicle is marketed in Pakistan as the BYD Shark 6. It went on sale in Pakistan on 25 July 2025.

=== Latin America ===
==== Argentina ====
The BYD Shark was launched in Argentina on 17 April 2026, in the sole unnamed variant.

==== Brazil ====
The BYD Shark went on sale in Brazil in October 2024 in a single variant.

==== Mexico ====
The Mexican market BYD Shark was introduced in May 2024. It is available in two trim levels, namely GL and GS.

=== Oceania ===
==== Australia ====
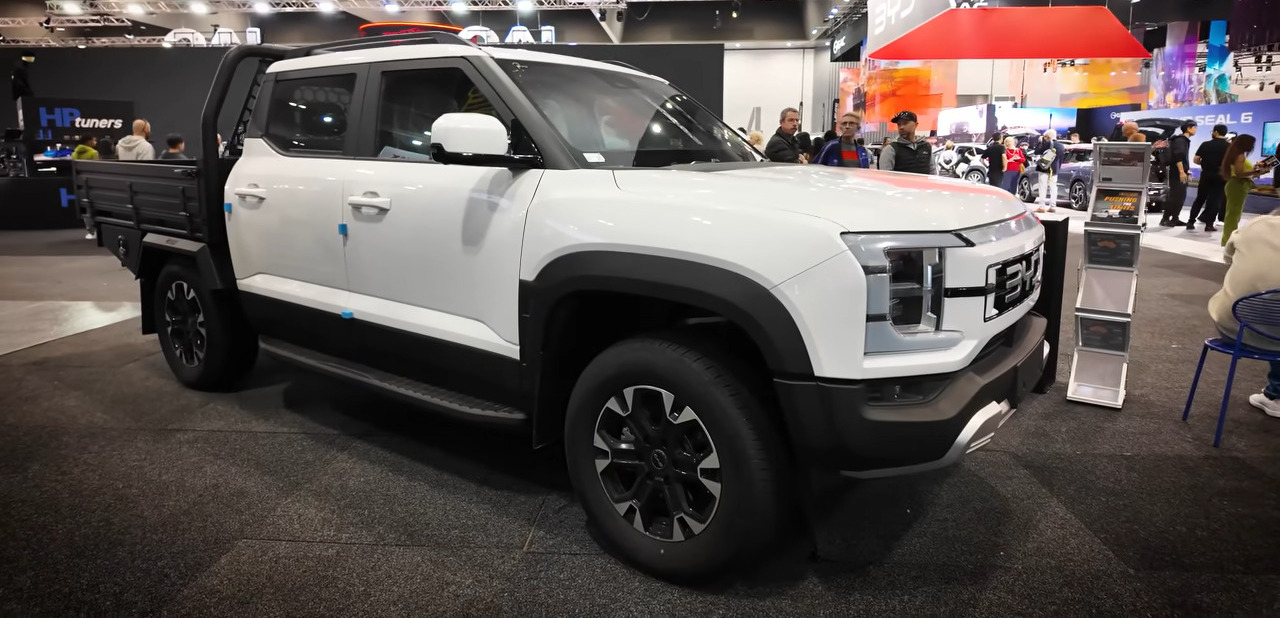
The BYD Shark 6 Dynamic at the 2026 Melbourne Motor Show.

The vehicle is marketed in Australia as the BYD Shark 6. It went on sale in Australia in late October 2024 in a single variant, Premium. In April 2026 the cab chassis Dynamic variant went on sale, with a alloy tray designed with Ironman 4x4, a four-wheel-drive accessories specialist. Also in April 2026 the Performance variant released, has increased performance and an additional "Crawl Mode" limiting the speed to 20 km/h (12 mph), to be added later to the Dynamic and Premium variants.

In April 2026, BYD made its 100,000th sale in Australia, a BYD Shark 6 Premium.

==== New Zealand ====
The vehicle is marketed in New Zealand as the BYD Shark 6. It went on sale in New Zealand in October 2024 in a single variant, Premium AWD. In April 2026, the Dynamic Cab-Chassis and Performance variants were added to the line-up.

== Safety ==
ANCAP test results BYD SHARK 6 (2025, aligned with Euro NCAP)
Test	Points	%
Overall:	5 /5 stars	
Adult occupant:	35.37	85%
Child occupant:	43	87%
Pedestrian:	47.14	74%
Safety assist:	15.59	86%

== Motorsport ==
The Shark 6 competed and won the Frontera Aventura 2025 Rally in the Dominican Republic in March 2025.

== Sales ==
In 2024, BYD exported 11,038 BYD Shark units from China.

Year	Australia	New Zealand
2025	18,073	1,885

== See also ==
- List of BYD Auto vehicles
