= Denza B5 =

Plug-in hybrid mid-size SUV

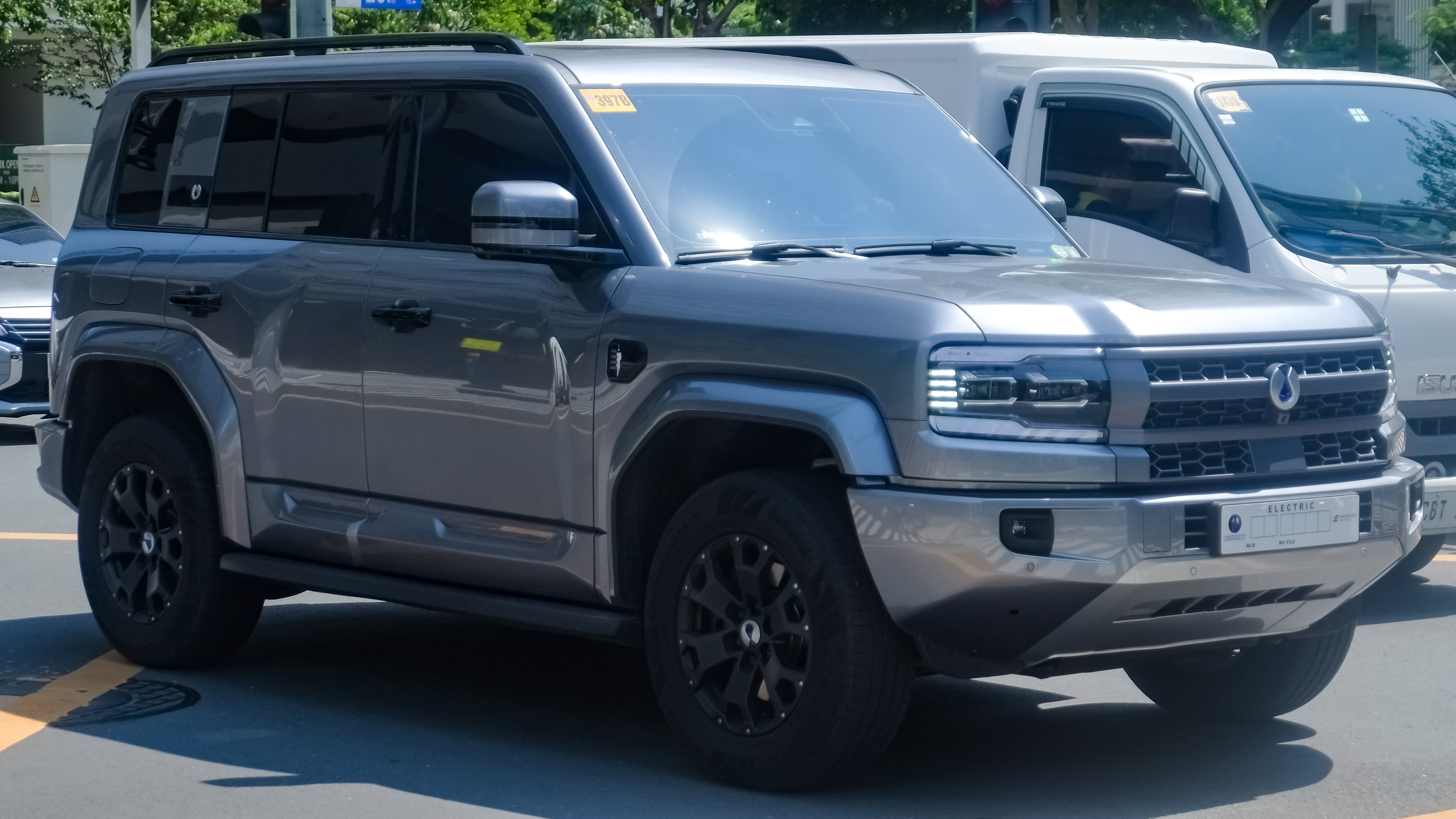

Overview
- Manufacturer: BYD Auto
- Model code: SFH
- Also called: Denza Bao 5 (Europe); Fangchengbao Bao 5 (China)
- Production: September 2023 – present
- Assembly: China: Shenzhen, Guangdong; Zhengzhou, Henan
- Designer: Under the lead of Wolfgang Egger

Body and chassis
- Class: Mid-size SUV
- Body style: 5-door SUV
- Layout: Front-engine, dual-motor four-wheel-drive
- Platform: DMO Super Hybrid
- Chassis: Body-on-frame
- Related: BYD Shark 6; Denza B8

Powertrain
- Engine: Petrol plug-in hybrid: 1.5 L BYD476ZQF turbo I4
- Electric motor: Permanent magnet synchronous
- Power output: 505 kW (677 hp; 687 PS) (China); 400 kW (536 hp; 544 PS) (Australia, New Zealand)
- Transmission: Single Speed DMO
- Hybrid drivetrain: Plug-in hybrid
- Battery: 31.8 kWh BYD Blade LFP
- Range: 1,200 km (746 mi) (CLTC); 975 km (606 mi) (NEDC)
- Electric range: 100 km (62 mi) (WLTC); 125 km (78 mi) (CLTC)
- Plug-in charging: 100 kW (DC)

Dimensions
- Wheelbase: 2,800 mm (110.2 in)
- Length: 4,888 mm (192.4 in); 4,921 mm (193.7 in) (Leopard)
- Width: 1,970 mm (77.6 in)
- Height: 1,920 mm (75.6 in); 1,930 mm (76.0 in) (Leopard)
- Curb weight: 2,897 kg (6,387 lb); 3,007 mm (118.4 in) (Leopard)

The Denza B5, also sold in China as the Fangchengbao Bao 5 (Chinese: 方程豹 豹5; lit. 'Formula leopard Leopard 5'), is a plug-in hybrid mid-size SUV manufactured by BYD Auto under the Fangchengbao and Denza brands. First launched in 2023, the Bao 5 is the first vehicle of the Fangchengbao brand's Bao Series (豹系列), which is later complemented by the Bao 8 and Tai 3. Beginning in 2025, the model was sold in export markets under the Denza brand, using the B5 model name.

== History ==
The Fangchengbao Bao 5 was introduced in China in August 2023 and went on sale in November 2023. It is distributed through Fangchengbao direct sales stores, instead of BYD dealerships.

== Design ==
It is an off-road oriented SUV with body-on-frame construction, and built on a DMO (Dual Mode Off-Road) Super Hybrid system from BYD Auto. It has an approach and departure angles of 35 and 32 degrees respectively. BYD also offers a high-spec variant of the Bao 5 with the Cloud-P chassis technology, featuring a height-adjustable hydraulic active suspension system from the Yangwang U8.

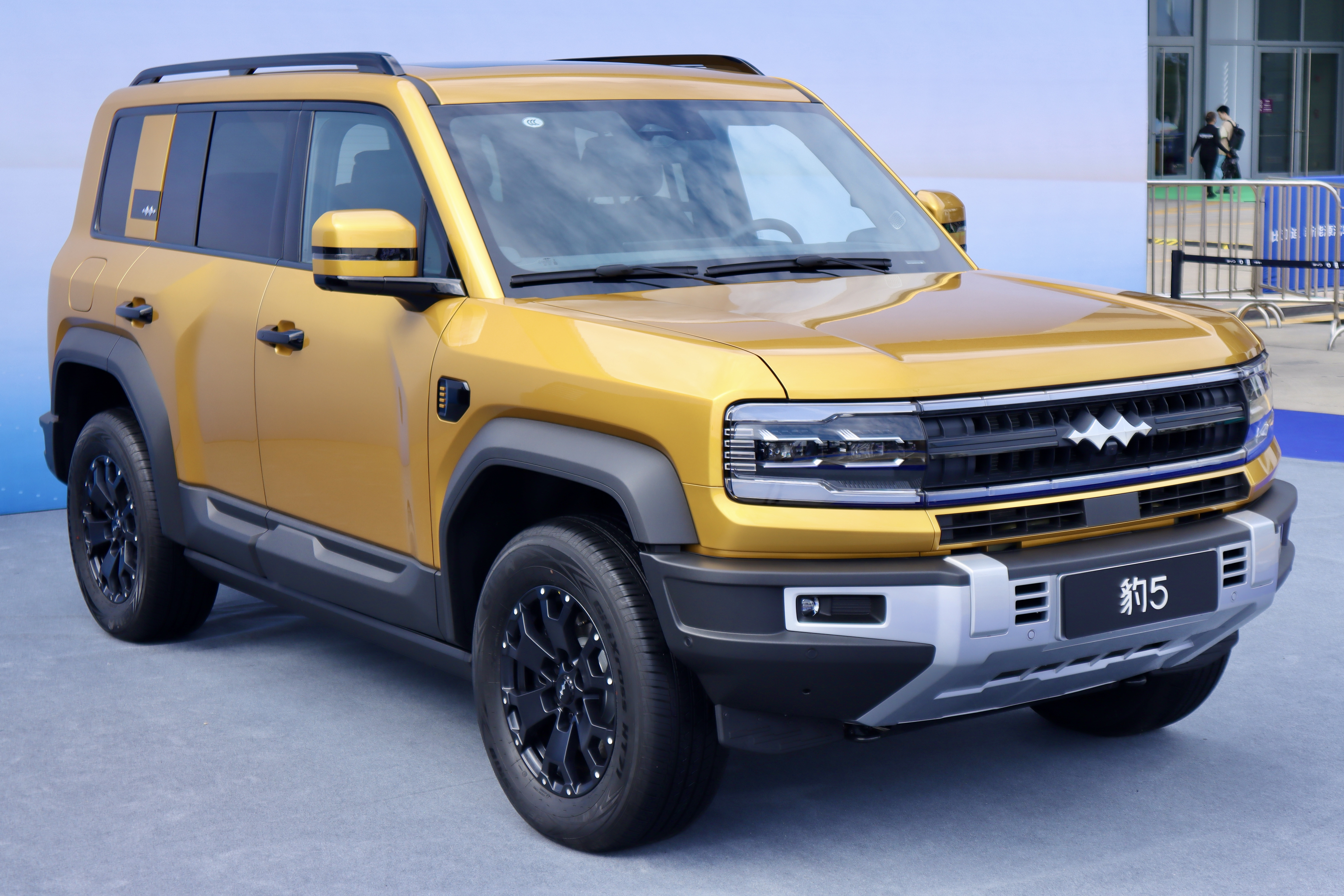
Fangchengbao Bao 5

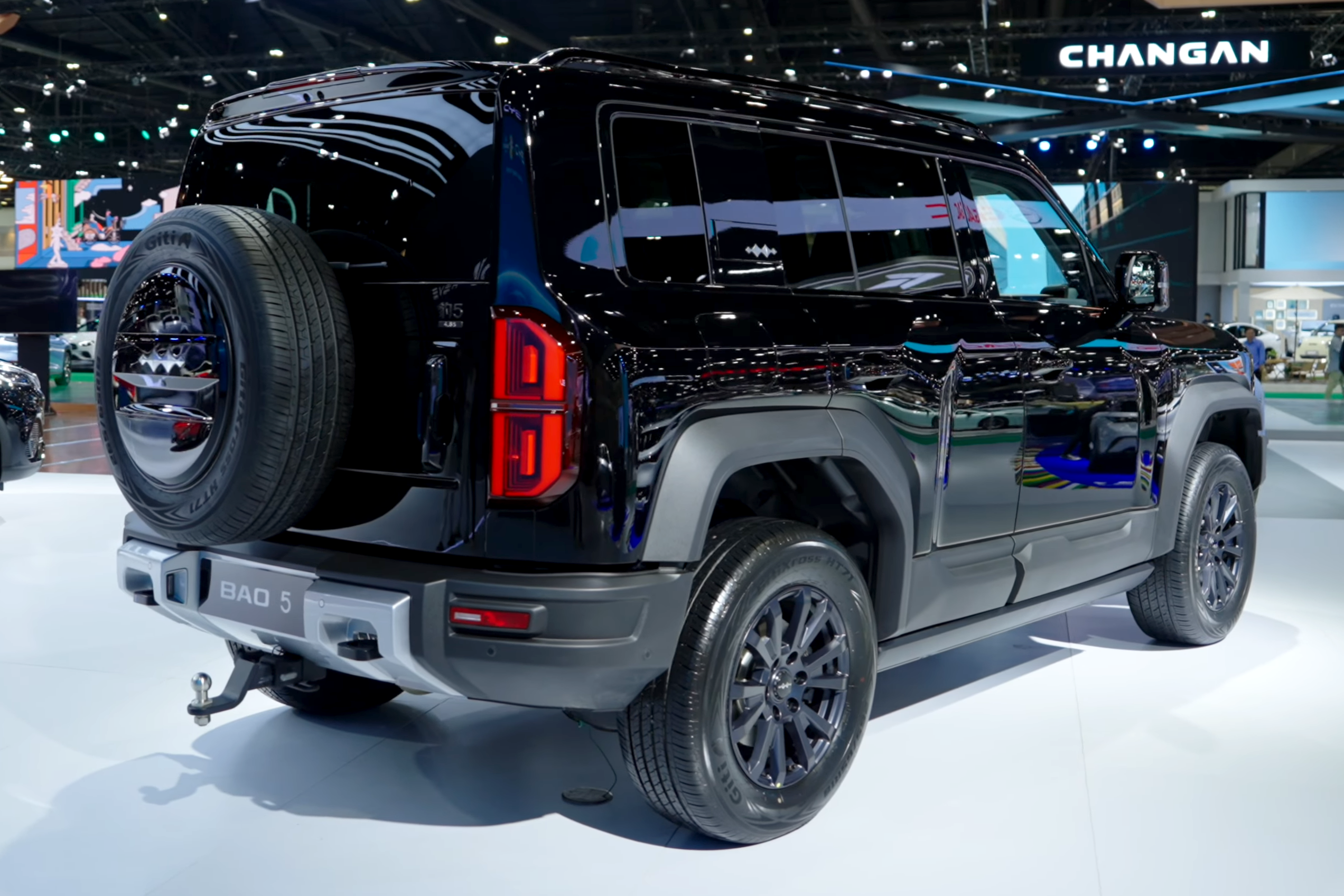
Rear view

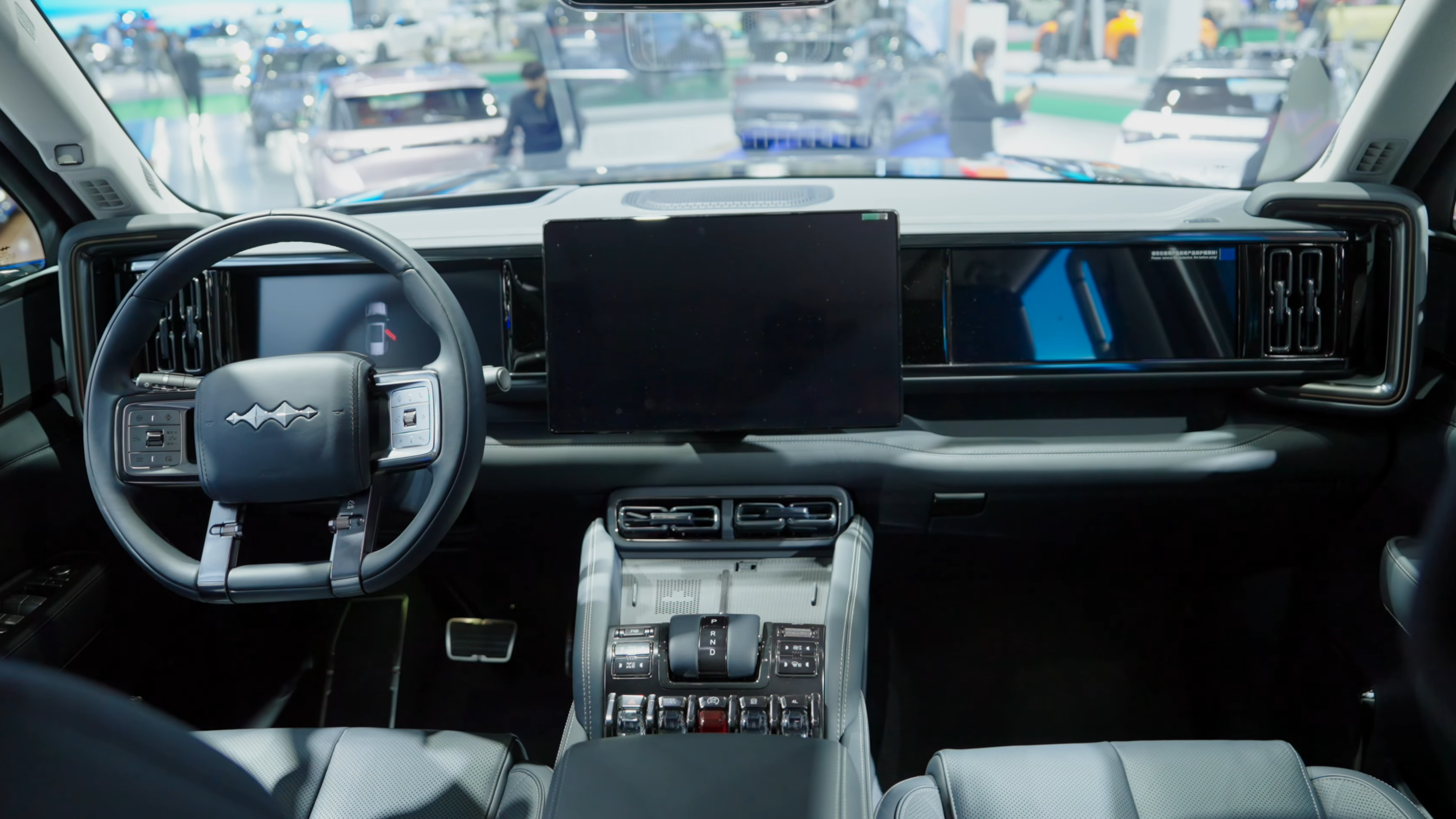
Interior

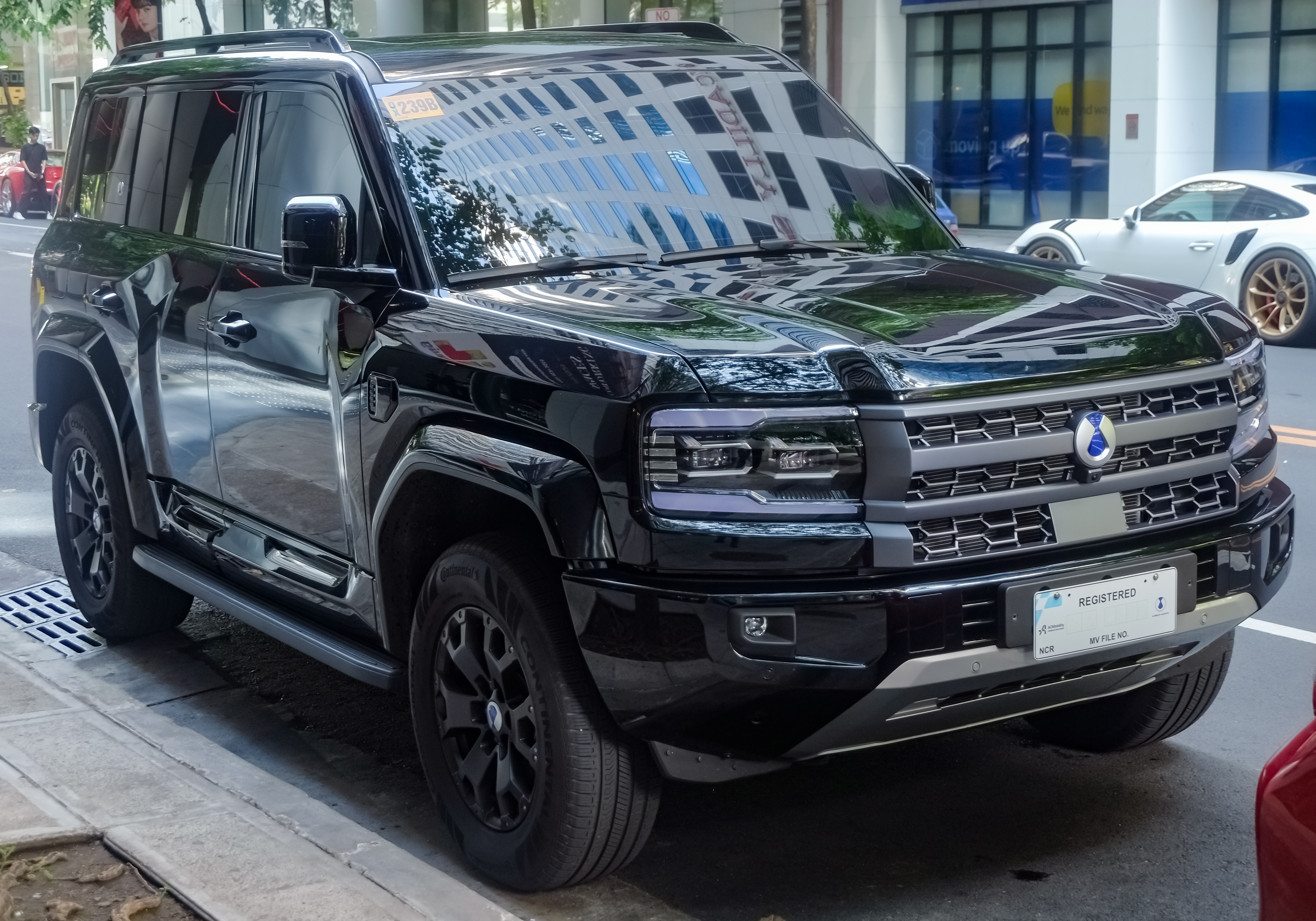
Denza B5

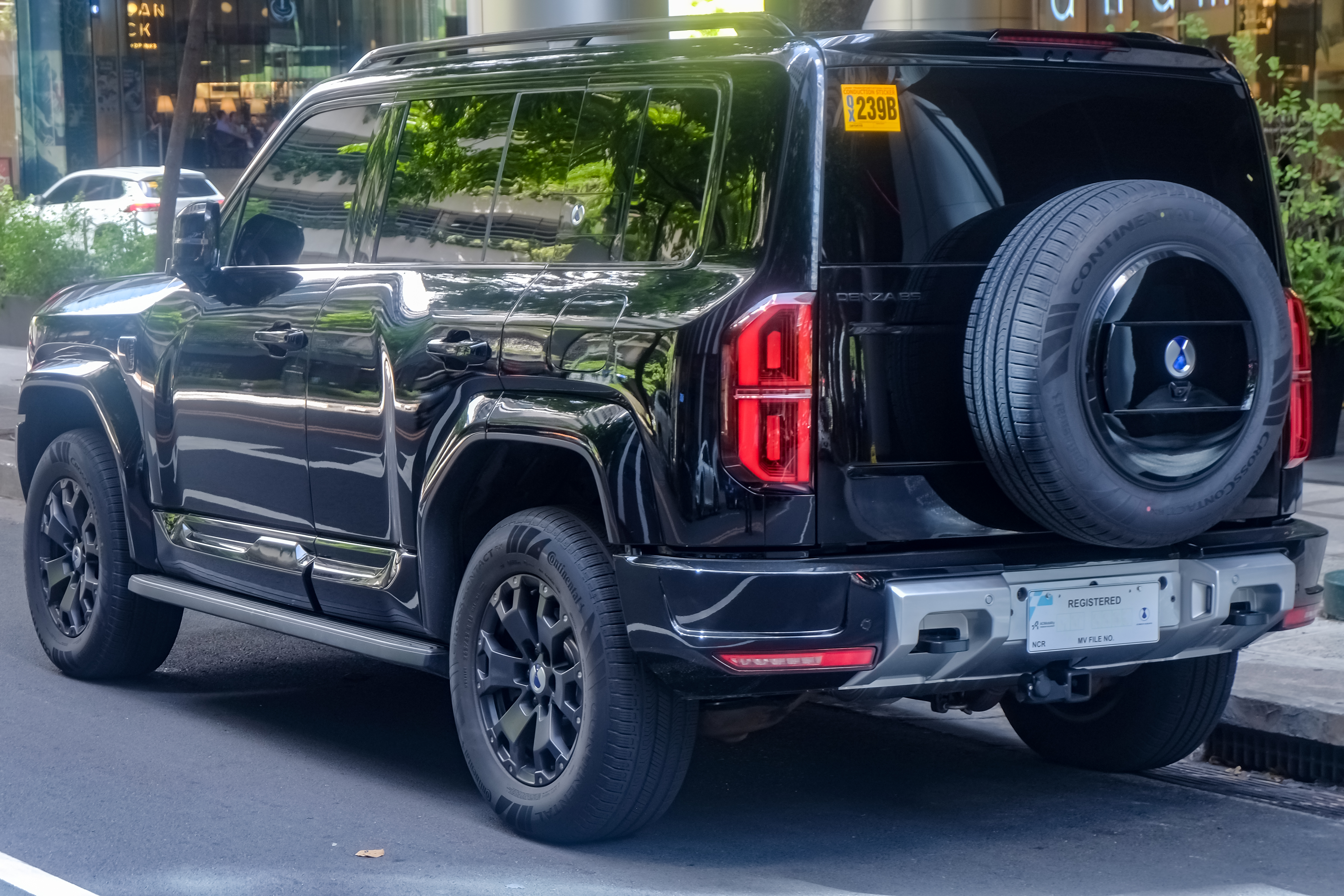
Rear view

== Powertrain ==
The Bao 5 is powered by a 1.5-litre 145 kW (194 hp; 197 PS) turbocharged petrol engine, two electric motors and three differential locks. The combined power output is rated at 505 kW (677 hp; 687 PS) and 760 N⋅m (77.5 kg⋅m; 561 lb⋅ft). The Bao 5 can reach 125 km (78 mi) (CLTC) in 16 minutes of charge. The combined range of the Bao is 1,200 km (750 mi). Other features of the vehicle include a Devialet sound system, a 50-inch head-up display and a 0–100 km/h (0–62 mph) acceleration time of 4.8 seconds.

The Denza B5 is powered by a 1.5-litre petrol engine and two electric motors, producing a combined 400 kW (536 hp; 544 PS) and 750 N⋅m (553 lb⋅ft) of torque.

== Markets ==
=== Americas ===
==== Brazil ====
The Denza B5 released in Brazil in December 2025.

=== Asia ===
==== China ====
The Fangchengbao Bao 5 released in China in November 2023. Releasing in three variants, Discovery, Pilot, and Yunnian Flagship. In November 2023 BYD Auto produced its six millionth New Energy Vehicle, a Bao 5. In February 2025 the Intelligent Driving edition released, which utilises a roof-mounted LiDAR system. The Long-Range Edition released in October 2025.

==== Philippines ====
The Denza B5 released in the Philippines in April 2026 alongside the B8. It is available in a single variant.

==== Singapore ====
The B5 was launched in Singapore on 19 March 2026, initially in the sole Orion variant. In September 2026, the flagship Zenith variant was added.

=== Middle East ===
==== United Arab Emirates ====
The Denza B5 released in the United Arab Emirates in November 2025. It is available in two variants, Deluxe and Flagship.

=== Oceania ===
==== Australia ====
The Denza B5 released in Australia in February 2026. It is available in two variants, an unnamed entry-level trim and Leopard. It features a 3,000 kg (6,614 lb) braked towing capacity, and payload capacity of 490 kg (1,080 lb).

The over-the-air update version 1.1.0, released in May 2026 added a towing mode, trailer weight selection, improved resistance detection in the rear seats to prevent the seats to fold on objects and passengers, and improved off-roading functionally; validated with hillclimbs up Beer O'Clock Hill in Queensland.

==== New Zealand ====
The Denza B5 released in New Zealand in February 2026. It is available in an unnamed entry-level model and Leopard.

== Safety ==
ANCAP test results Denza B5 all variants (2025, aligned with Euro NCAP)
| Test | Points | % |
|---|---|---|
| Overall: | 5 /5 stars | |
| Adult occupant: | 34.71 | 86% |
| Child occupant: | 46.81 | 95% |
| Pedestrian: | 47.01 | 74% |
| Safety assist: | 14.07 | 78% |

== Sales ==
| Year | China |
|---|---|
| 2023 | 4,888 |
| 2024 | 45,989 |
| 2025 | 51,887 |
