= Denza B8 =

Plug-in hybrid full-size SUV

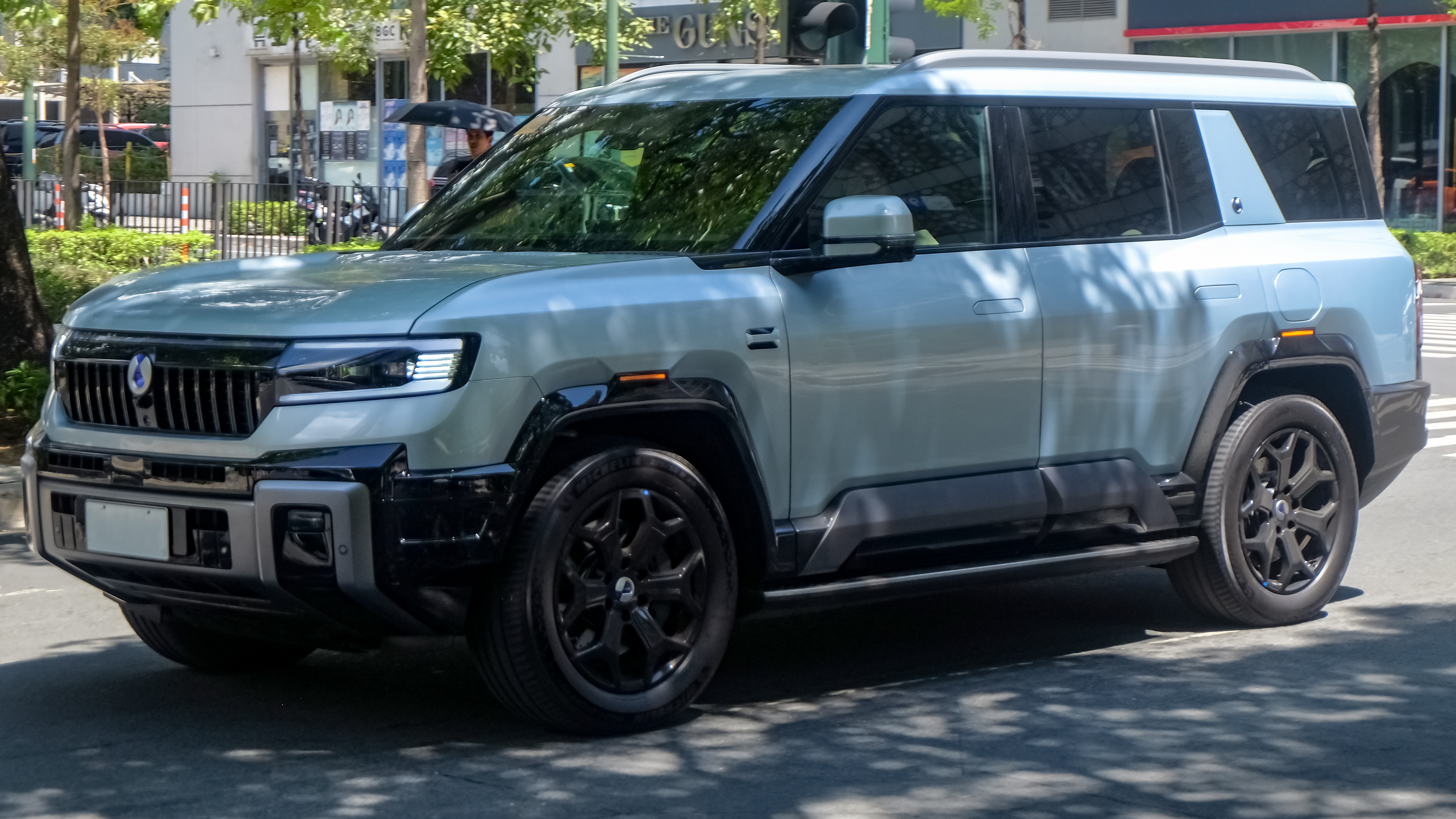

Overview
- Manufacturer: BYD Auto
- Also called: Fangchengbao Bao 8 (China)
- Production: November 2024 – present
- Assembly: China: Shenzhen, Guangdong; Zhengzhou, Henan
- Designer: Under the lead of Wolfgang Egger

Body and chassis
- Class: Full-size SUV
- Body style: 5-door SUV
- Layout: Front-engine, dual-motor four-wheel-drive
- Platform: DMO Super Hybrid
- Chassis: Body-on-frame
- Related: BYD Shark 6; Denza B5

Powertrain
- Engine: Petrol plug-in hybrid: 2.0 L BYD487ZQD turbo I4
- Electric motor: Permanent magnet synchronous
- Power output: 550 kW (738 hp; 748 PS) (China); 425 kW (570 hp; 578 PS) (Australia, New Zealand)
- Transmission: Single Speed DMO
- Hybrid drivetrain: Plug-in hybrid
- Battery: 36.8 kWh BYD Blade LFP
- Range: 1,200 km (746 mi) (CLTC); 1,040 km (646 mi) (NEDC)
- Electric range: 100 km (62 mi) (WLTC)
- Plug-in charging: 120 kW (DC)

Dimensions
- Wheelbase: 2,920 mm (115.0 in)
- Length: 5,195 mm (204.5 in)
- Width: 1,994 mm (78.5 in)
- Height: 1,905 mm (75.0 in)
- Curb weight: 3,305 kg (7,286 lb)

The Denza B8, also sold in China as the Fangchengbao Bao 8 (Chinese: 方程豹 豹8; lit. 'Formula leopard Leopard 8') is a plug-in hybrid full-size SUV manufactured by BYD Auto under the Fangchengbao and Denza brands. It is the largest vehicle from the Fangchengbao brand, slotting above the Bao 5 / Denza B5. The model was introduced outside China under the Denza brand, using the B8 model name.

== History ==
The Bao 8 was first previewed as a concept car called the Fangchengbao Super 8 in August 2023 during the Fangchengbao brand launch. In April 2024, the Bao 8 was introduced in a production-ready prototype form, alongside the Super 3 and Super 9 concept cars. Its interior images were revealed in June 2024. Pre-sales in China were opened in October 2024, before its market launch in November.

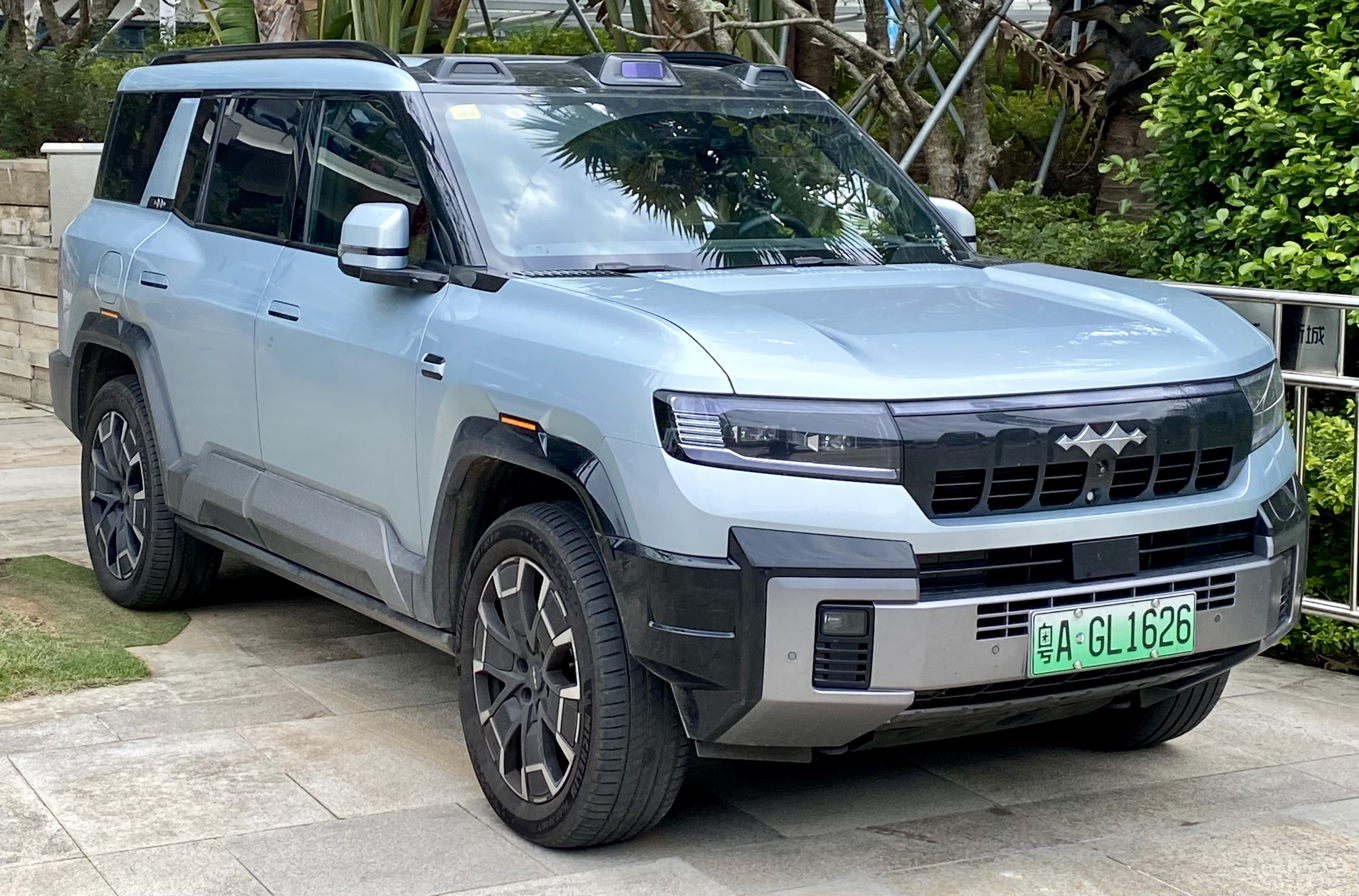
Fangchengbao Bao 8

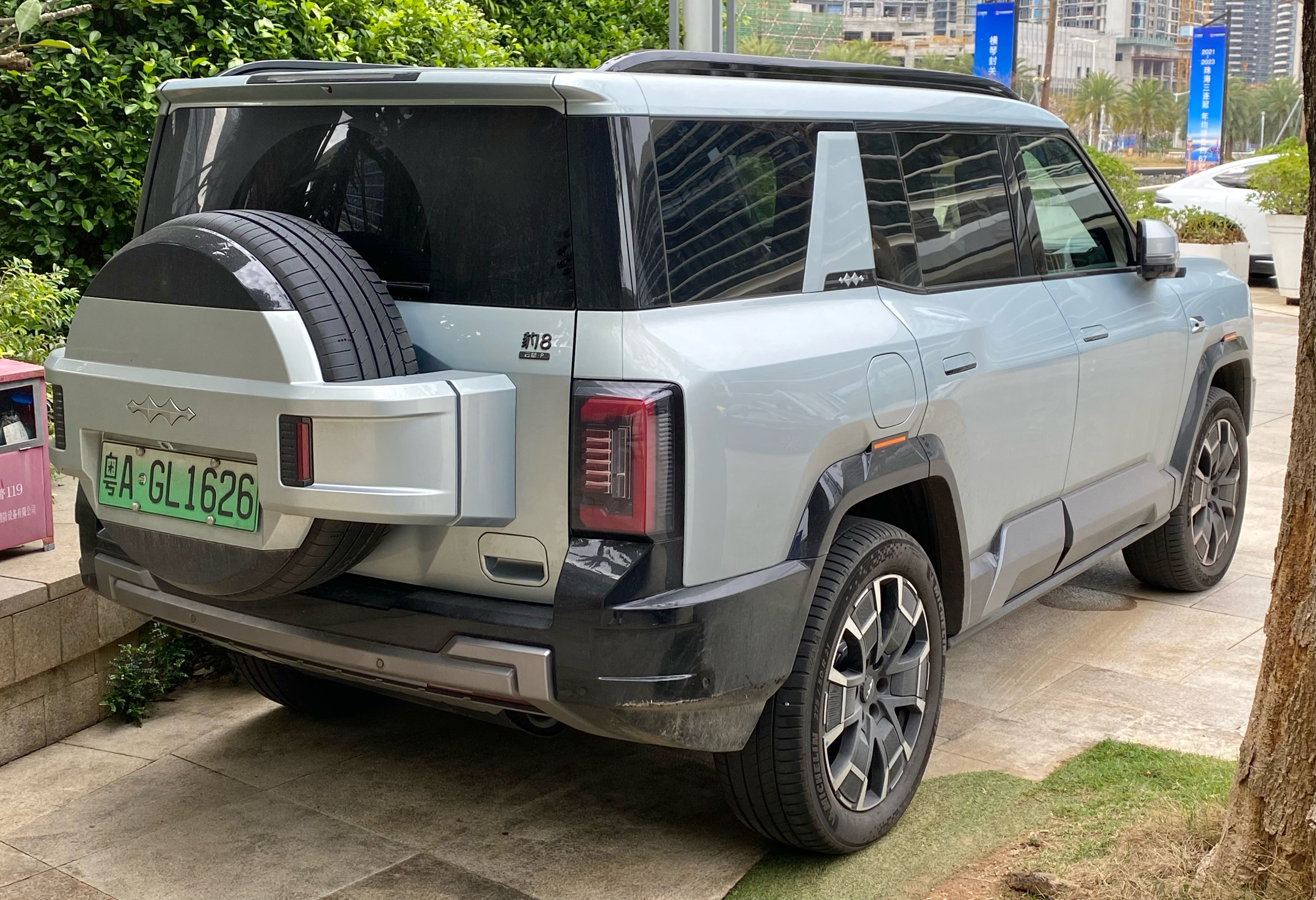
Rear view

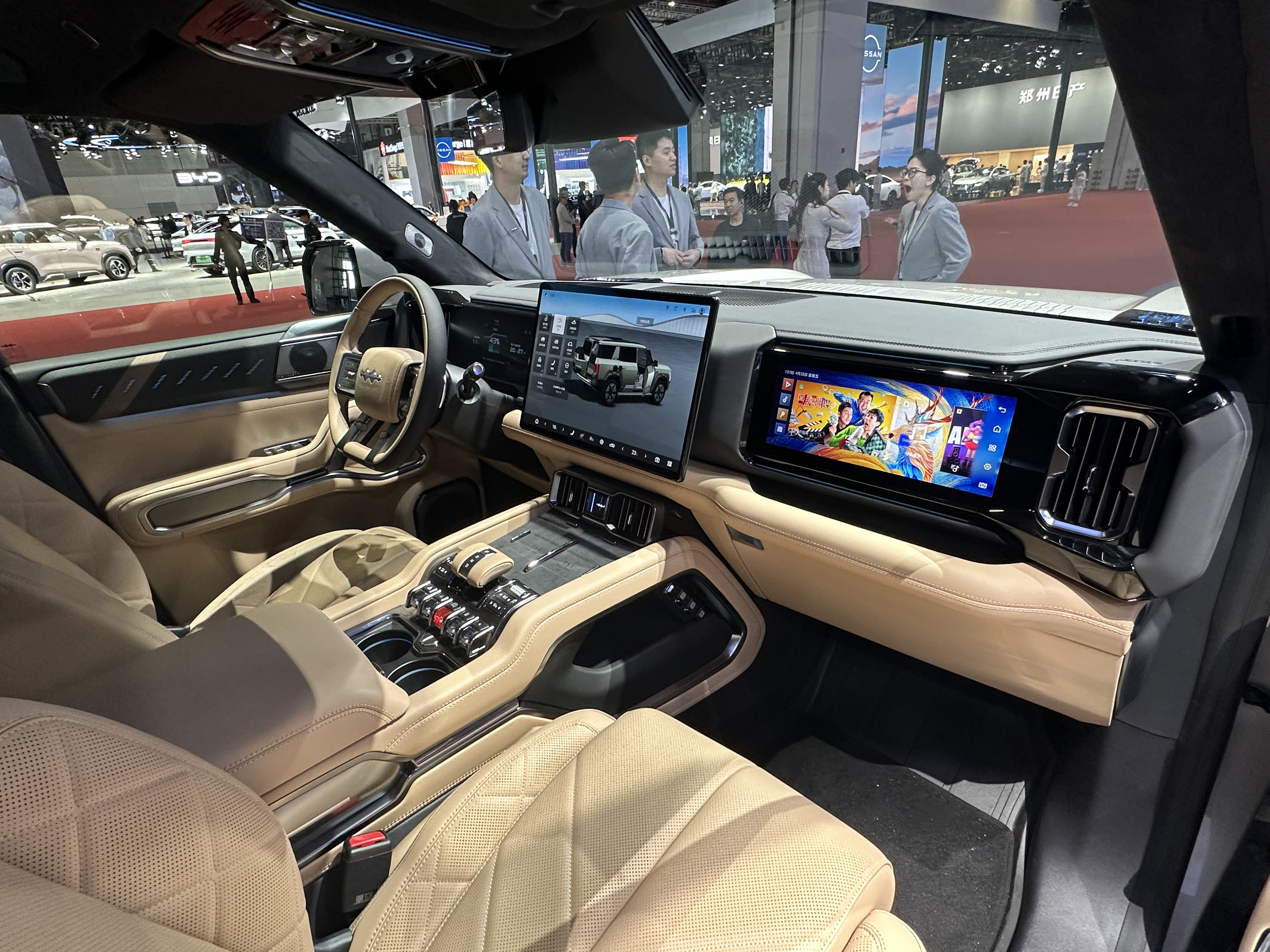
Interior

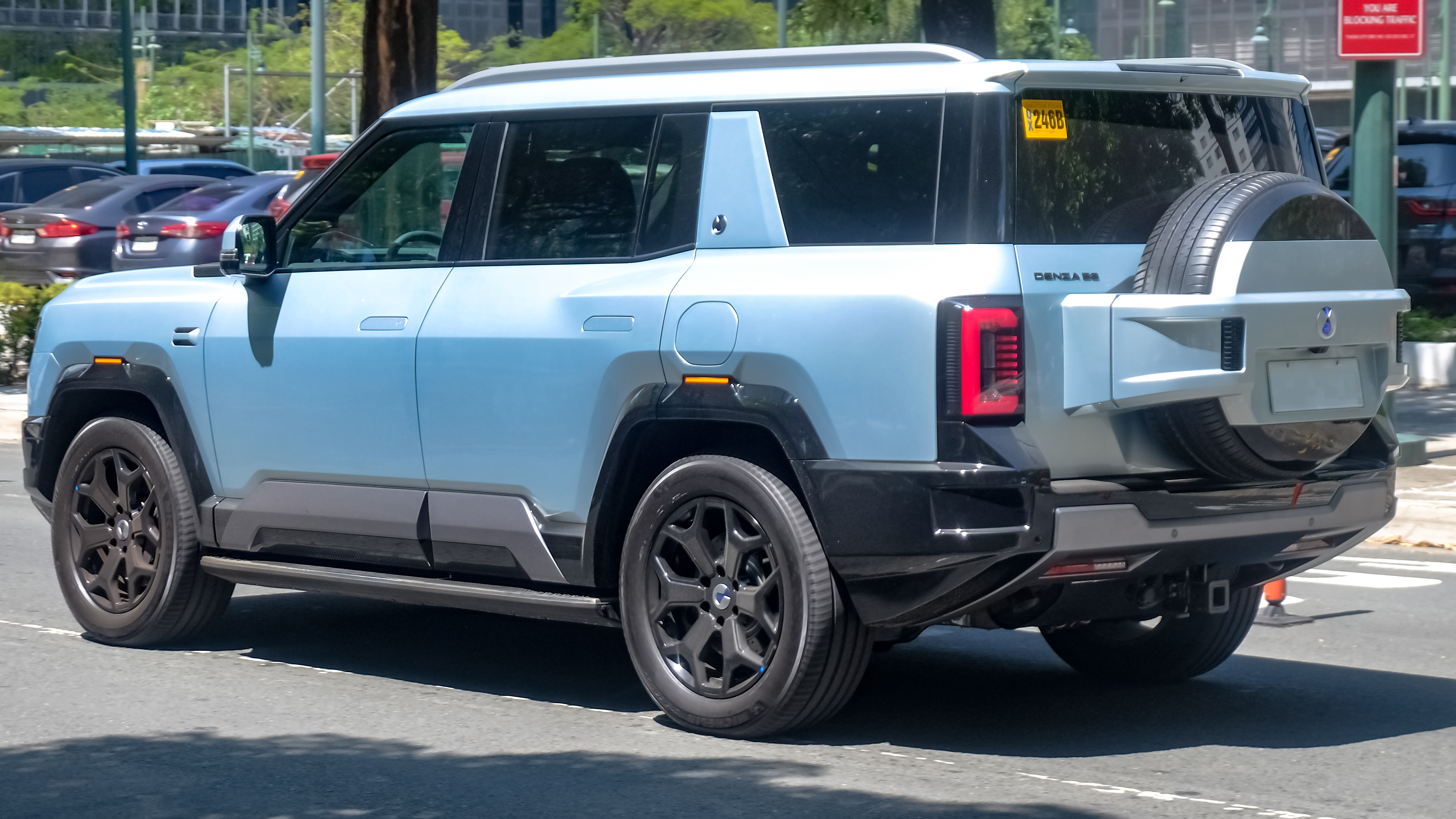
Rear view

== Equipment and specifications ==
The Bao 8 is Fangchengbao's second vehicle, currently positioned above the body-on-frame Bao 5 / Denza D5 in the Bao series, and between the unibody Ti7 and Ti9. Although its full length measures 5,195 mm (204.5 in), that dimension includes the tailgate-mounted spare tire; its length is approximately 4,850 mm (190.9 in) without the spare tire, making it closer to a mid-size SUV in length.

It is the first BYD product to feature Huawei's driving assistance system. BYD and Huawei initiated joint development on the Bao 8 in January 2024. In late August 2024, both companies formalized their collaboration to develop the first smart-driving solution specifically designed for off-road vehicles.

The vehicle features a DiSus-P air suspension system, enabling a maximum ground clearance of 310 mm (12.2 in). Under normal suspension settings, the ground clearance is rated 220 mm (8.7 in). Approach and departure angles are 34 and 35 degrees with maximum clearance, and 29 and 18 degrees with standard clearance. The Bao 8 is equipped with low-speed 4WD mode, three automatic differential locks, and multiple off-road modes, including snow, sand, mud, and wading.

The interior of the Bao 8 come equipped with three screens, including a 12.3-inch instrument panel, a 17.3-inch infotainment system, and a 12.3-inch passenger touchscreen. Additional features include a 50-inch augmented reality head-up display, powered by BYD's own BYD9000 chip. It also supports Huawei UWB mobile phone car key functionality, enabling app transfers between Huawei devices and the infotainment system. Other features include a cooling storage compartment, ambient lighting, a fragrance system, and an 18-speaker audio setup. Two seating configuration options are available, including a seven-seat layout (2+3+2) or a six-seat layout (2+2+2).

The Bao 8 features Huawei's Qiankun ADS 3.0, introduced in April 2024, a driving assistance system supported by a with roof-mounted LiDAR sensor providing advanced intelligent driving capabilities, including urban NOA (Navigate on Autopilot). The system employs an end-to-end network architecture designed to enhance safety and efficiency. It enables autonomous driving between parking spaces, including automated parking, and handles complex scenarios such as navigating gates and narrow lane turnarounds.

== Powertrain ==
The Bao 8 uses a Dual Mode Off-road (DMO) parallel plug-in hybrid system with a 2.0-litre petrol engine and two electric motors, delivering a combined 550 kW (738 hp; 748 PS) and 760 N⋅m (561 lb⋅ft). Acceleration from 0–100 km/h (0–62 mph) takes 4.8 seconds. A 36.8 kWh BYD Blade LFP battery provides 100 km (62 mi) of WLTC electric range and a combined electric and fuel range of 1,200 km (746 mi). BYD claims, the fuel consumption with a drained battery is 8.5 L/100 km (12 km/l; 28 mpg_{‑US}). Stationary generation 20 kW.

The Denza B8 is powered by the 2.0-litre petrol engine and two electric motors, producing a combined 425 kW (570 hp; 578 PS) and 760 N⋅m (561 lb⋅ft) of torque.

== Safety ==
C-NCAP (2024) test results 2025 Fangchengbao Bao 8 Smart Brave Flagship (7-seater)
Category		%
Overall:	5 /5 stars	88.5%
Occupant protection:		90.27%
Vulnerable road users:		83.54%
Active safety:		89.99%

ANCAP test results Denza B8 all variants (2025, aligned with Euro NCAP)
Test	Points	%
Overall:	5 /5 stars	
Adult occupant:	34.40	86%
Child occupant:	46.81	95%
Pedestrian:	47.52	75%
Safety assist:	14.07	78%

== Markets ==
=== Asia ===
==== China ====
The Fangchengbao Bao 8 released in November 2024. It released with four variants: Luxury 7-Seat, Luxury 6-Seat, Flagship 7-Seat, and Flagship 6-Seat. In October 2025, two variants were added: Luxury 5-seat and Flagship 5-seat.

==== Malaysia ====
The Denza B8 was launched in Malaysia on 21 May 2026, with two variants: Dynamic (7-seater) and Premium (6-seater).

==== Philippines ====
The Denza B8 was launched in the Philippines on 23 April 2026 alongside the B5. It is available with two variants: Dynamic (7-seater) and Premium (6-seater).

=== Oceania ===
==== Australia ====
The Denza B8 was launched in Australia in February 2026, as part of Denza's entry to the Australian market. It is available in two unnamed variants, with seven and six seats respectively, the six seater has captain's chairs in the second row and front differential lock in addition to the rear locker. It features a braked towing capacity of 3,500 kg (7,716 lb), and payload capacity of 702 kg (1,548 lb),

The over-the-air update version 1.1.0, released in May 2026 added a towing mode, improved resistance detection in the second and third row preventing the seats to fold on objects and passengers, and improved off-roading functionally; validated with hillclimbs up Beer O'Clock Hill in Queensland.

==== New Zealand ====
The Denza B8 had orders open in New Zealand on 9 December 2025, as part of Denza's entry to the New Zealand market. It is available with seven (7S) and six-seat (6S) variants.

== Sales ==
Year	China
2024	7,295
2025	18,097
