= GWM Cannon Alpha =

Mid-size pickup truck

Great Wall Shanhai Cannon
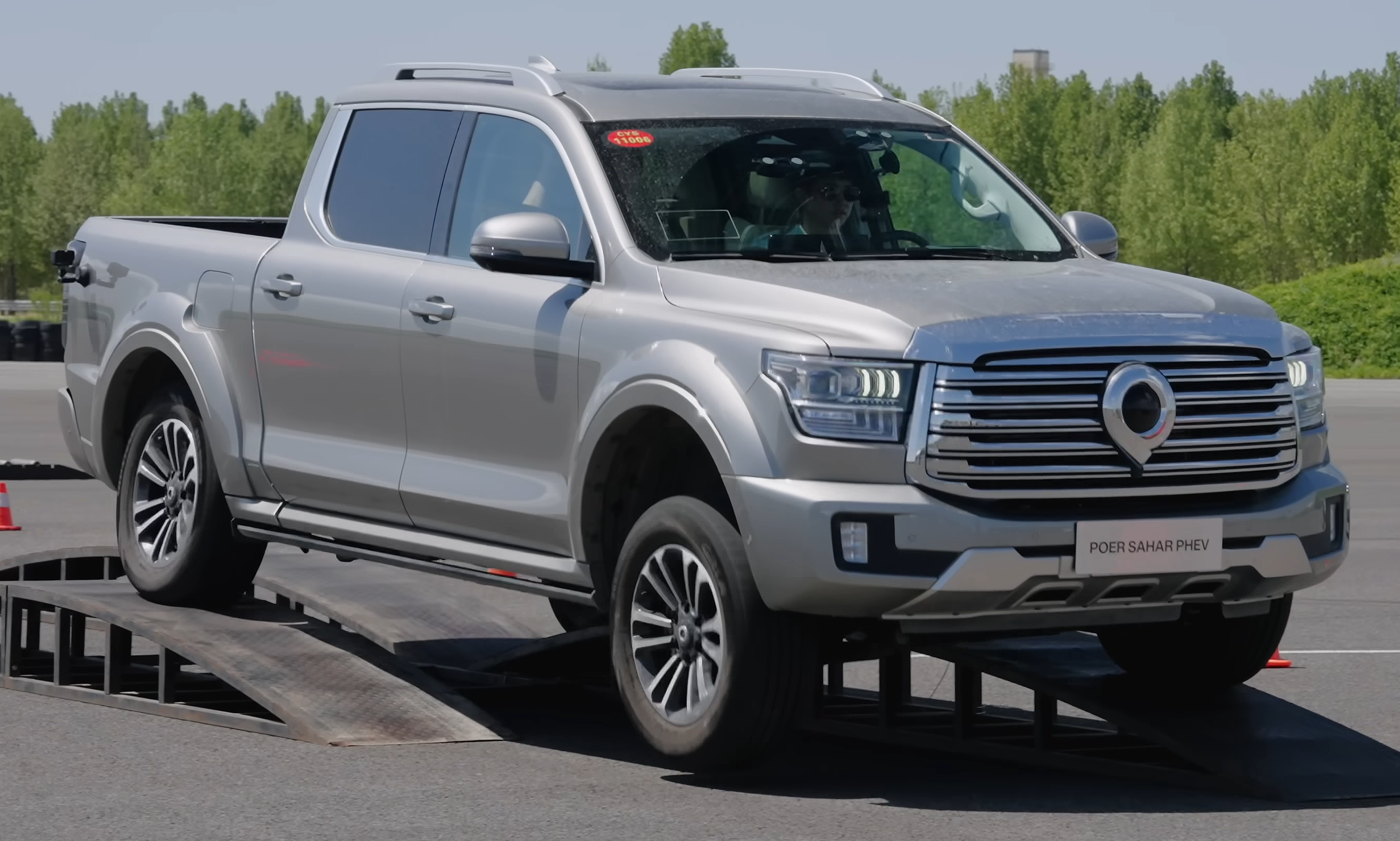

Overview
- Manufacturer: Great Wall Motor
- Also called: Great Wall Shanhai Cannon (China); GWM Poer Sahar (Thailand); GWM Cannon Alpha (Australia and New Zealand); GWM P500 (South Africa)
- Production: 2022–present
- Assembly: China: Tianjin; Thailand: Rayong (GWM Thailand)

Body and chassis
- Class: Mid-size pickup truck
- Body style: 4-door crew cab
- Layout: Front-engine, rear-wheel drive; Front-engine, four-wheel-drive
- Related: Tank 500

Powertrain
- Engine: Petrol: 3.0 L GW6Z30 twin turbo V6; Petrol hybrid: 2.0 L GW4N20 HEV turbo I4; Diesel: 2.4 L GW4D24 I4 turbodiesel; 3.0 L GW4F30 I4 turbodiesel
- Power output: 120kW P2 electric motor (PHEV)
- Transmission: 9-speed automatic; 9-speed 9HAT automatic (HEV)
- Hybrid drivetrain: Mild hybrid (V6); Power-split (HEV)
- Battery: 37.1 kWh NCM (PHEV)
- Plug-in charging: V2L: 6 kW (PHEV); 50 kW DC (PHEV); 6.6 kW AC (PHEV)

Dimensions
- Wheelbase: 3,350 mm (131.9 in)
- Length: 5,440–5,445 mm (214.2–214.4 in)
- Width: 1,991 mm (78.4 in)
- Height: 1,924 mm (75.7 in)

The Great Wall Cannon Alpha is a mid-size pickup truck produced by Great Wall Motor since 2022. It was first introduced at the Chengdu Auto Show in August 2022. The vehicle is positioned above the Great Wall Pao, with larger exterior dimensions and larger powertrain output. Its SUV derivative is marketed as the Tank 500. It is called the Great Wall Shanhai Cannon (Chinese: 山海炮; pinyin: Shānhǎi Pào, literally: Mountain Sea Cannon) in China.

In November 2024, the vehicle was launched in Thailand as the GWM Poer Sahar. It will also be marketed in Australia and New Zealand in mid-2024 as the GWM Cannon Alpha.

== Overview ==
The Cannon Alpha was introduced on 26 August 2022 at the Chengdu Auto Show, and went on sale in the Chinese market on 30 December 2022 at the Guangzhou Auto Show. It uses a body-on-frame chassis shared with the Tank 500, with an option of a V6 petrol engine with 48V mild hybrid system and a diesel engine. All models come equipped with series is equipped with a BorgWarner 4A+MLOCK four-wheel drive system as standard.

The rear tailgate of the Cannon Alpha features dual opening mechanisms: a conventional drop-down function with dampers and a 60:40 split, barn-door style sideways opening. The release button, concealed within the logo, operates two functions: a regular press lowers the tailgate, while a brief press initiates the sideways opening.

The Cannon Alpha features a dashboard that is shared with the Tank 500. It includes a digital meter panel, a 12.3-inch touchscreen display, 10 Infinity-branded speakers, and electric front seats with eight-way adjustment for the driver and four-way adjustment for the passenger. The leather seats are equipped with massage functionality and ventilation. Other equipment include advanced driver assistance systems (ADAS) package, a 360-degree camera, reclinable rear seats up to 33 degrees, and a central rear armrest with a wireless smartphone charging pad.

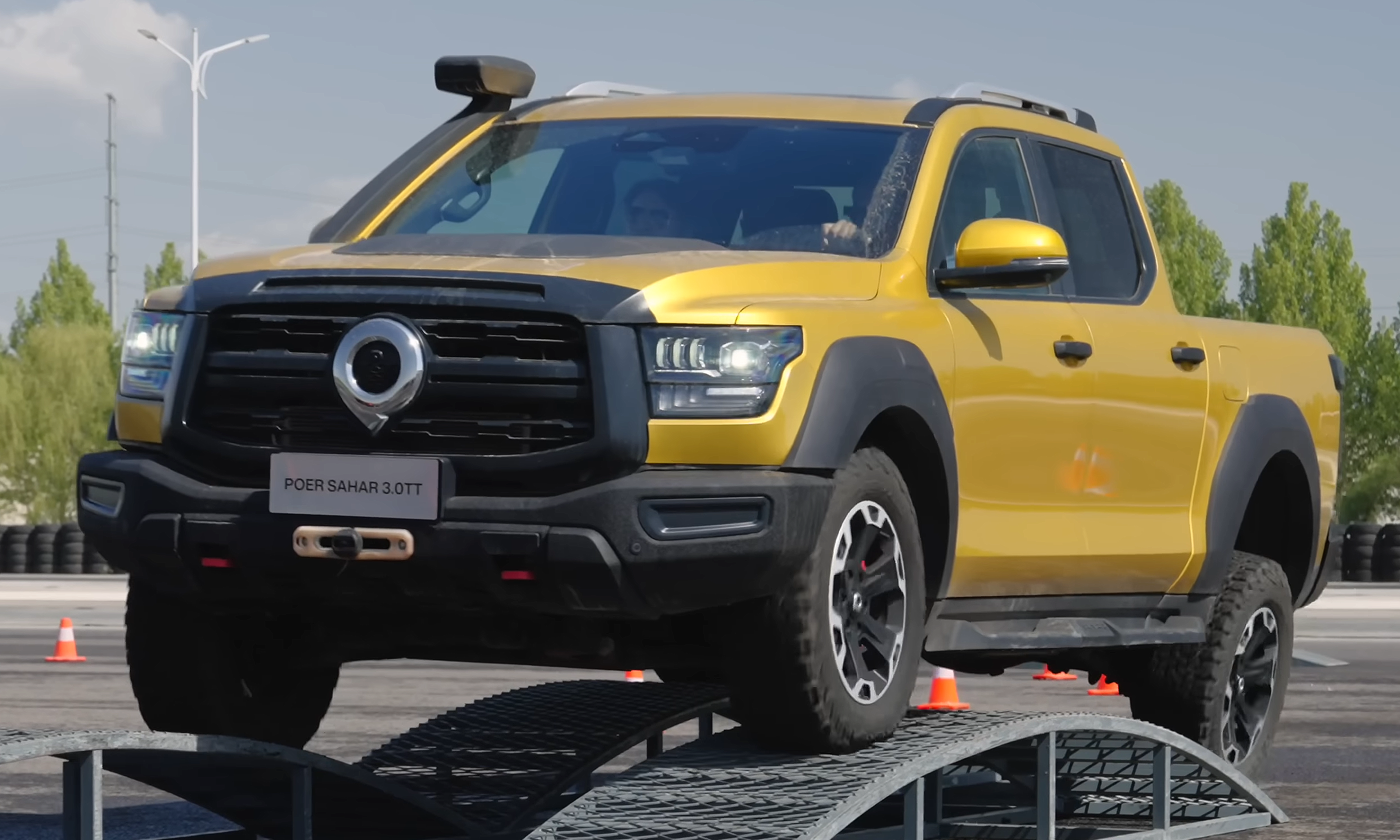
GWM Poer Sahar 3.0TT

== GWM Poer Sahar HEV ==
The hybrid version of the Cannon Alpha was introduced in Thailand as the GWM Poer Sahar HEV at the Bangkok International Motor Show in March 2024. The vehicle is powered by a 2.0-litre four-cylinder turbocharged petrol engine producing 180 kW (241 hp; 245 PS) and 380 N⋅m (38.7 kg⋅m; 280 lb⋅ft), combined with an electric motor with 78 kW (105 hp; 106 PS) and 268 N⋅m (27.3 kg⋅m; 198 lb⋅ft) paired to a lithium-ion battery, 9-speed automatic gearbox and rear-wheel-drive or four-wheel drive system. The hybrid powertrain is also used by the Tank 300 HEV.

== Markets ==
=== Australia ===
The Cannon Alpha was launched in Australia on 3 May 2024, as the first hybrid electric ute sold in Australia. It is available in two trim levels: Lux and Ultra; it is powered by either a 2.4-litre turbocharged diesel or a 2.0-litre turbocharged petrol hybrid (HEV). In February 2025, the 2.0-litre turbocharged petrol plug-in hybrid (PHEV) powertrain was made available for the Lux and Ultra trim levels. In July 2025, the turbocharged hybrid (HEV) was discontinued, leaving the PHEV option as the only hybrid option for the Cannon Alpha in Australia. In August 2026, the 3.0-litre GW4F30 turbo-diesel was introduced to the line-up for the Lux and Vanta trims.

=== South Africa ===
The P500 was launched in South Africa on the 14 August 2024, alongside the Tank 500 SUV. It is available in three trim levels: Luxury, Super Luxury and Ultra Luxury, it is powered by either a 2.4-litre turbocharged diesel or a 2.0-litre turbocharged petrol hybrid (HEV). The P500 line-up was updated in August 2025 for the 2025 model year which saw changes in exterior styling. In September 2026, the 3.0-litre GW4F30 turbo-diesel engine was introduced in South Africa as the sole engine option for the P500 and also became available with two variants: Super Luxury (4x2) and Ultra Luxury (4x4).

=== Thailand ===
The Poer Sahar was launched in Thailand on 28 November 2024, with two variants: Pro (2WD) and Ultra (4WD), powered by a 2.0-litre turbocharged petrol hybrid (HEV).

== Safety ==
ANCAP test results GWM Cannon Alpha (2024, aligned with Euro NCAP)
Test	Points	%
Overall:	5 /5 stars	
Adult occupant:	33.98	84%
Child occupant:	46	93%
Pedestrian:	51.99	82%
Safety assist:	14.74	81%

== Powertrain ==
Type	Engine code	Displ.	Power	Torque	Combined system output	Electric motor	Battery	Transmission	Layout	Cal. years
Petrol mild hybrid	GW6Z30	2,993 cc (3.0 L) twin-turbo V6 mild hybrid	265 kW (355 hp; 360 PS) @ 6,000 rpm	500 N⋅m (51.0 kg⋅m; 369 lb⋅ft) @ 1,500–4,500 rpm	-	-	48 V	9-speed automatic	4WD	2022–present
Petrol hybrid	GW4N20 HEV	1,998 cc (2.0 L) I4 turbocharged	Engine: 180 kW (241 hp; 245 PS) @ 5,500–6,000 rpm Motor: 78 kW (105 hp; 106 PS)	Engine: 380 N⋅m (38.7 kg⋅m; 280 lb⋅ft) @ 1,700–4,000 rpm Motor: 268 N⋅m (27.3 kg⋅m; 198 lb⋅ft)	258 kW (346 hp; 351 PS) / 615 N⋅m (62.7 kg⋅m; 454 lb⋅ft)	TZ290XH003 3-in-1 motor drive system	1.75 kWh lithium-ion	9-speed 9HAT automatic	RWD / 4WD	2024–present
Diesel	GW4D24	2,370 cc (2.4 L) I4 turbo-diesel	137 kW (184 hp; 186 PS) @ 3,600 rpm	480 N⋅m (48.9 kg⋅m; 354 lb⋅ft) @ 1,500–2,500 rpm	-	-	-	9-speed automatic	4WD	2022–present
Diesel	GW4F30	2,994 cc (3.0 L) I4 turbo-diesel	170 kW (230 hp; 230 PS)	620 N⋅m (63.2 kg⋅m; 457 lb⋅ft) @ 1,400-2,400 rpm	-	-	-	9-speed automatic	4WD	2026–present
