= GWM Tank 500 =

Full-size luxury SUV

Tank 500
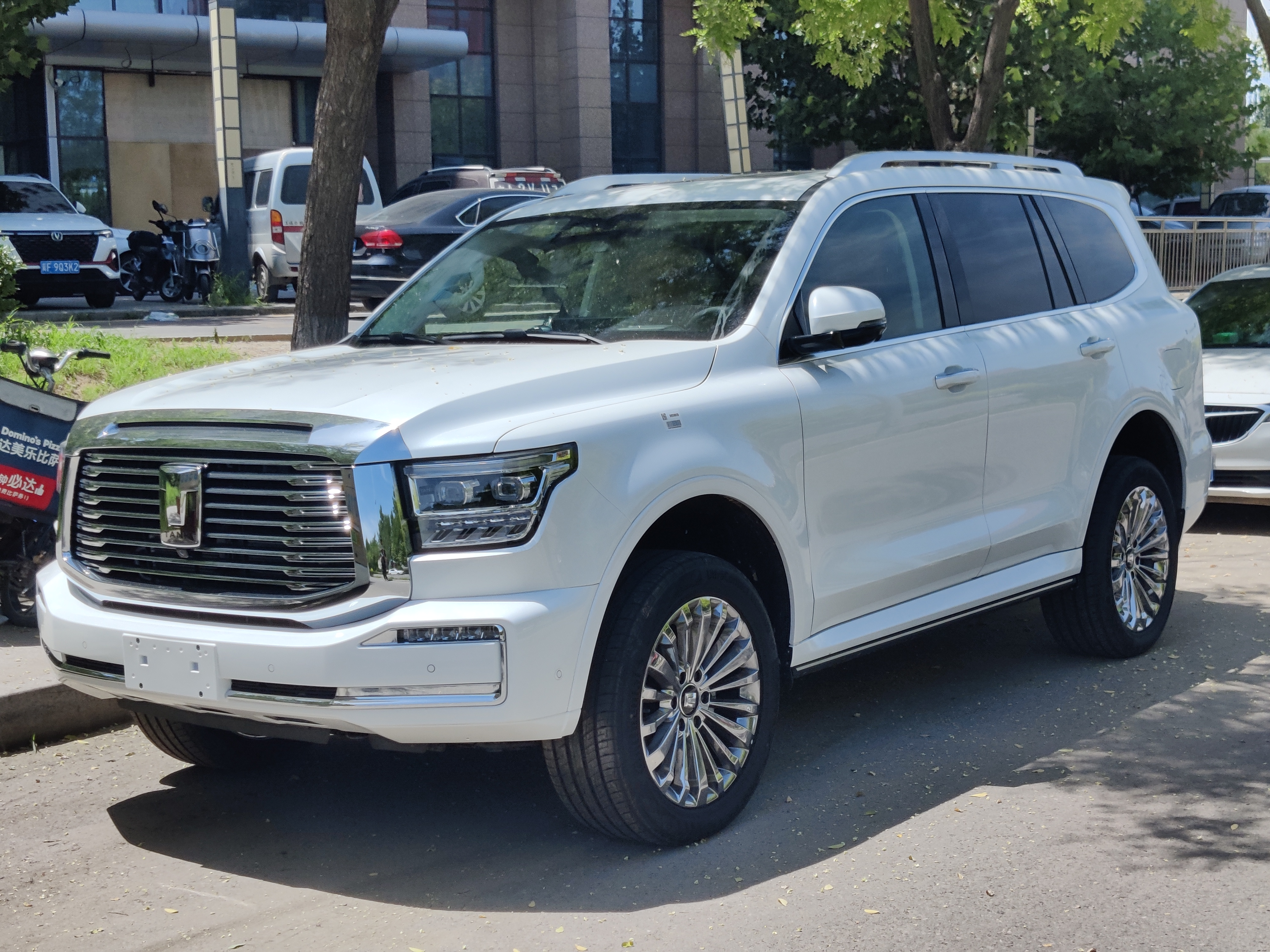
- Business version

Overview
- Manufacturer: Great Wall Motor
- Model code: P03
- Also called: Tank 500 (China)
- Production: 2021–present
- Assembly: China: Tianjin; Thailand: Rayong (GWM Thailand); Pakistan: Lahore (GWM Pakistan); Uzbekistan: Jizzakh (ADM)

Body and chassis
- Class: Full-size luxury SUV
- Body style: 5-door SUV
- Layout: Longitudinal front-engine, rear-wheel drive; Longitudinal front-engine, four-wheel drive
- Platform: GWM Tank
- Chassis: Body-on-frame
- Related: Great Wall Shanhai Cannon

Powertrain
- Engine: Petrol: 3.0 L GW6Z30 twin turbo V6; Petrol hybrid: 2.0 L GW4N20 HEV turbo I4; Petrol plug-in hybrid: 2.0 L GW4N20 PHEV turbo I4; 2.0 L GW4E20NB PHEV turbo I4; Diesel: 2.4 L GW4D24 I4 turbodiesel; 3.0 L GW4F30 I4 VGT turbodiesel
- Electric motor: Belt-driven integrated starter generator (V6); TZ290XH003 3-in-1 motor drive system (HEV); Single motor or Dual Motors (P2 architecture) (PHEV)
- Power output: 345 hp (257 kW; 350 PS) (HEV); 349 hp (260 kW; 354 PS) (V6); 402 hp (300 kW; 408 PS) (PHEV Hi4-T); 865 hp (645 kW; 877 PS) (PHEV Hi4-Z)
- Transmission: 9-speed 9AT/9HAT automatic; 3-speed DHT (PHEV Hi4-Z)
- Hybrid drivetrain: Mild hybrid (V6); Power-split (500 HEV); PHEV (500 PHEV)
- Battery: 48V (V6, mild hybrid); 1.75 kWh (HEV); 37.1 kWh (PHEV Hi4-T); 59.05 kWh (PHEV Hi4-Z)

Dimensions
- Wheelbase: 2,850 mm (112.2 in)
- Length: 4,886–4,928 mm (192.4–194.0 in) (interior spare wheel); 5,070 mm (199.6 in) (exterior spare wheel)
- Width: 1,934 mm (76.1 in)
- Height: 1,905 mm (75.0 in)
- Kerb weight: 2,455–2,535 kg (5,412–5,589 lb)

The GWM Tank 500 or Tank 500 (Chinese: 坦克500; pinyin: Tǎnkè 500) is a full-size luxury SUV produced by Great Wall Motor under the Tank marque. It is the second model to be introduced from the brand after the Tank 300, and seats seven passengers across three rows. Its pickup truck counterpart is marketed as the Great Wall Shanhai Cannon.

== Overview ==
The Tank 500 was revealed on 29 August 2021 at the Chengdu Auto Show, and was officially launched on 18 March 2022 in China. There are six models in four versions: business version, sport version, customized version, and black warrior version.

The Tank 500 is based on a body-on-frame chassis, locking front and rear differentials, and impressive off-road capability including 8.8-inch (223.5 mm) ground clearance, a 31.5-inch (800.1 mm) wading depth, and a 29.6º approach angle. The vehicle features a fully digital dashboard, with a 12.3-inch screen for the driver, and a 14.6-inch screen in the centre stack for infotainment.

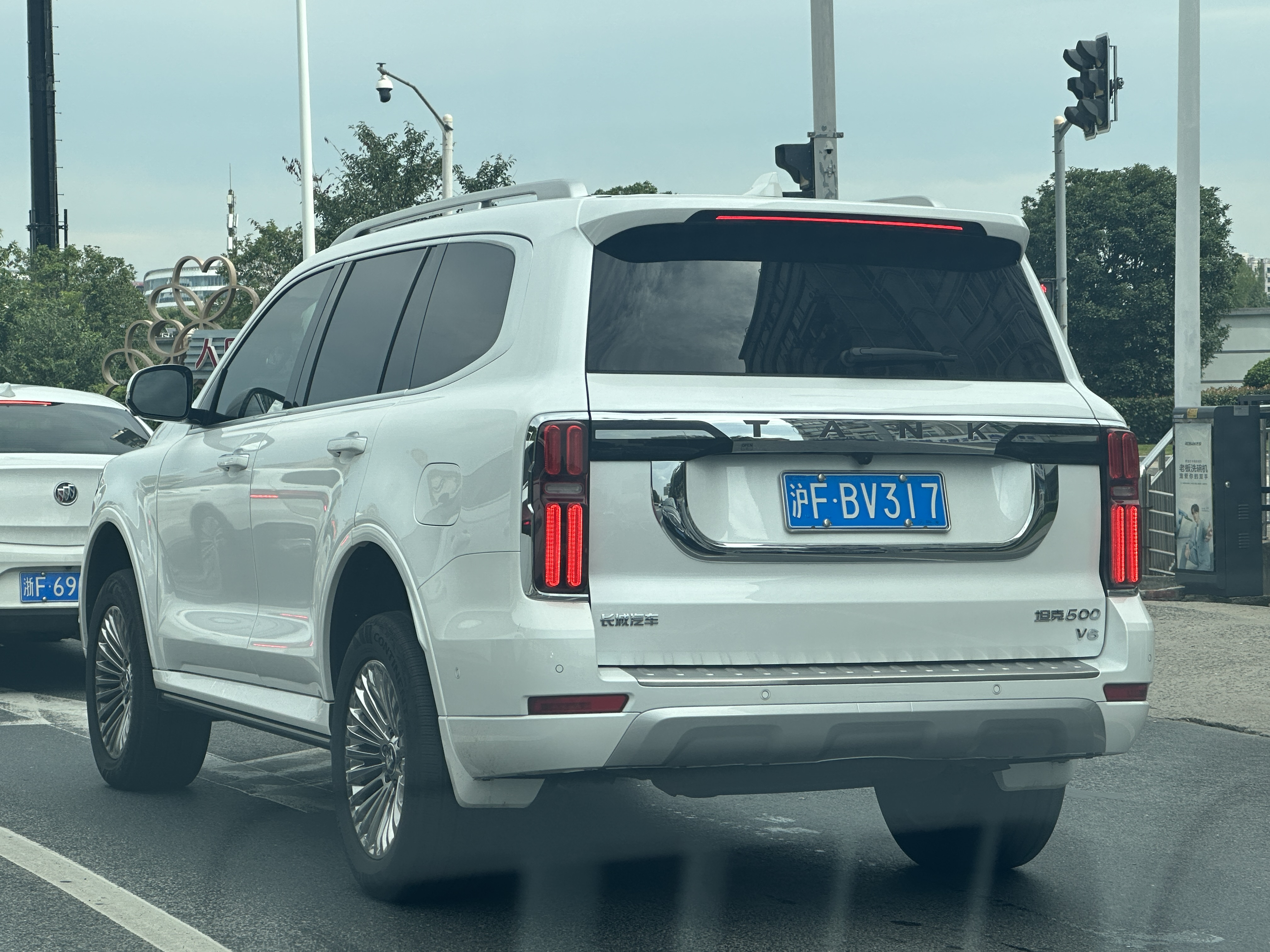
Rear view

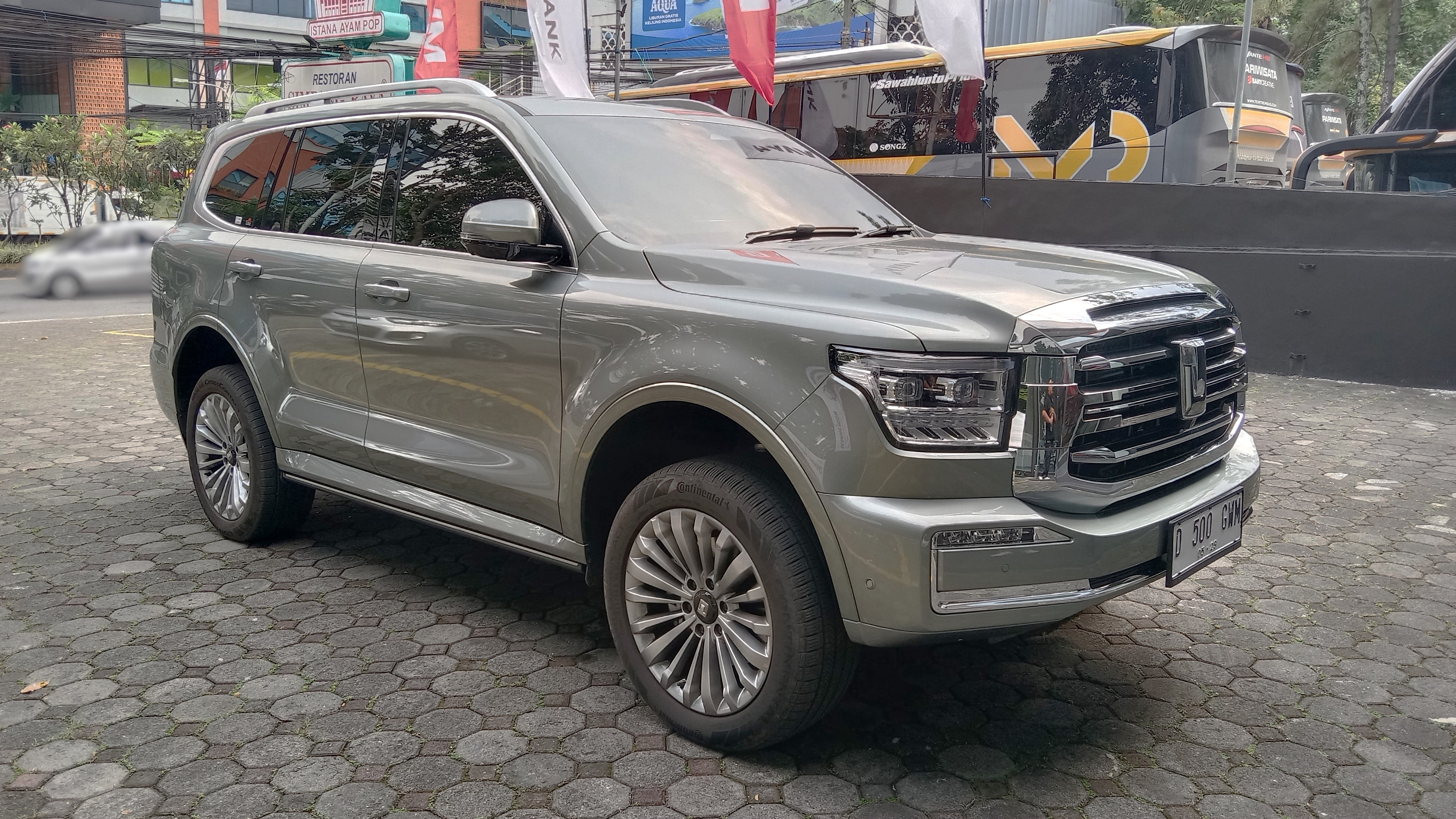
Sport version

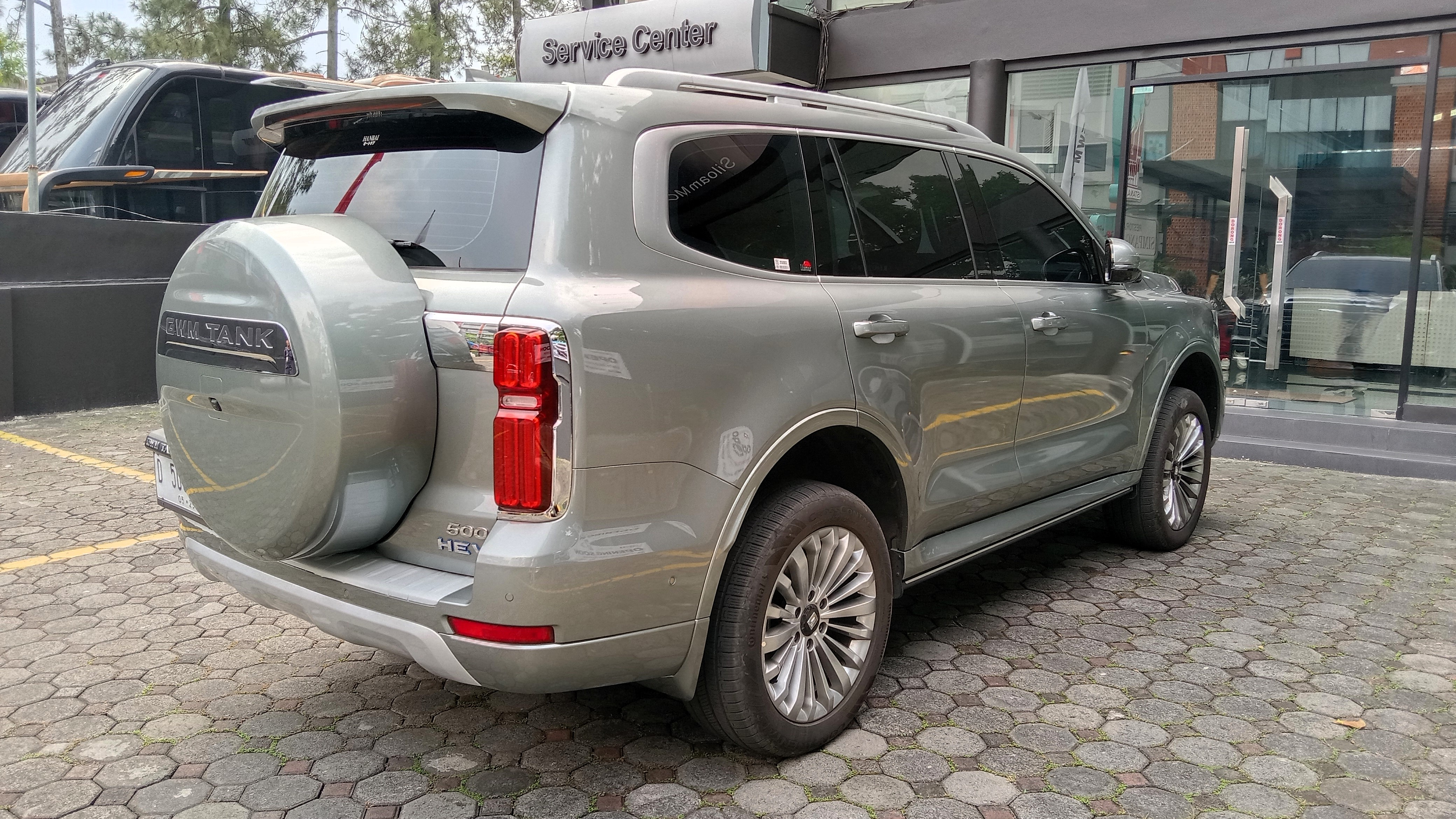
Rear view

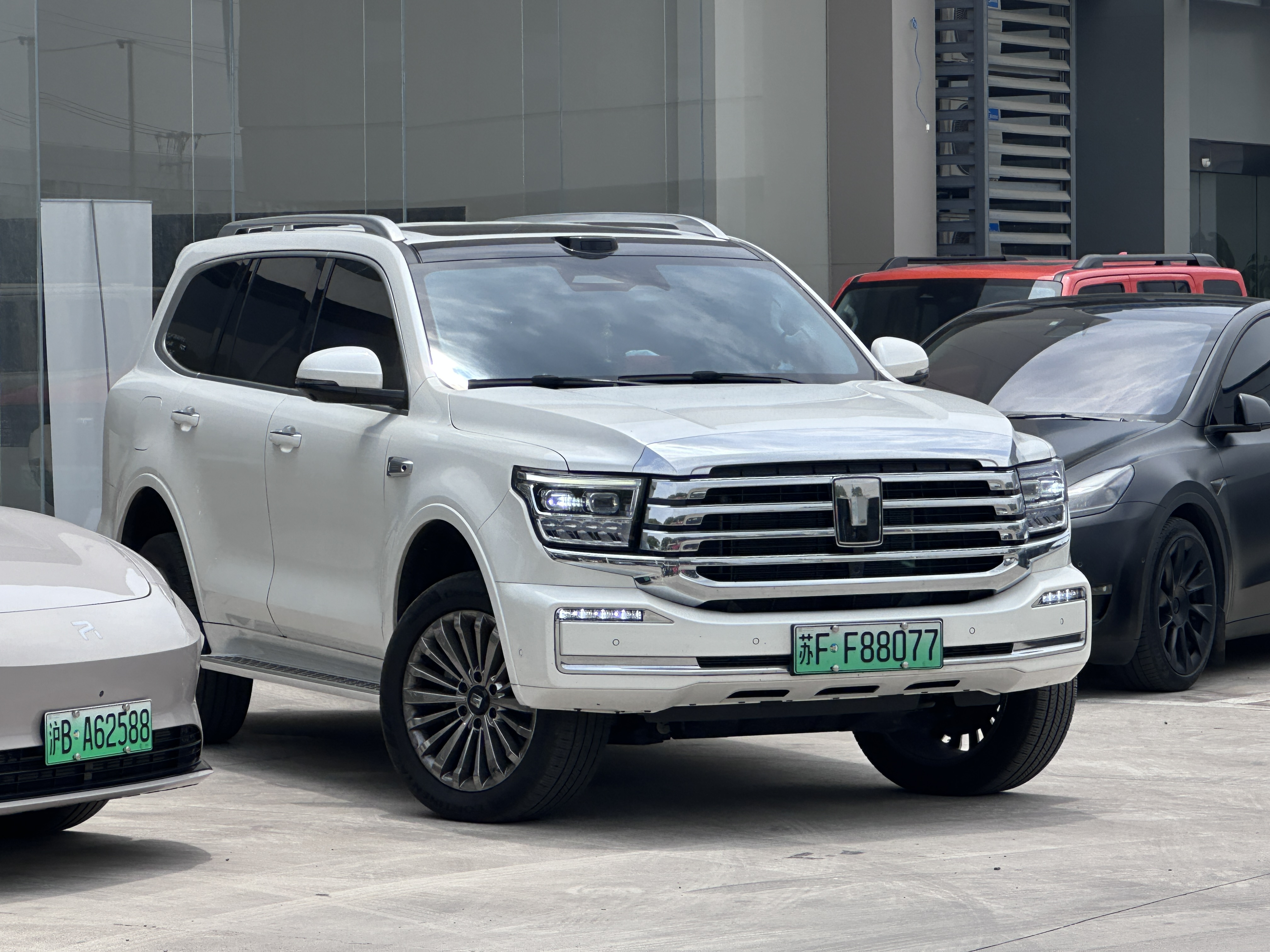
Tank 500 2026 (facelift)

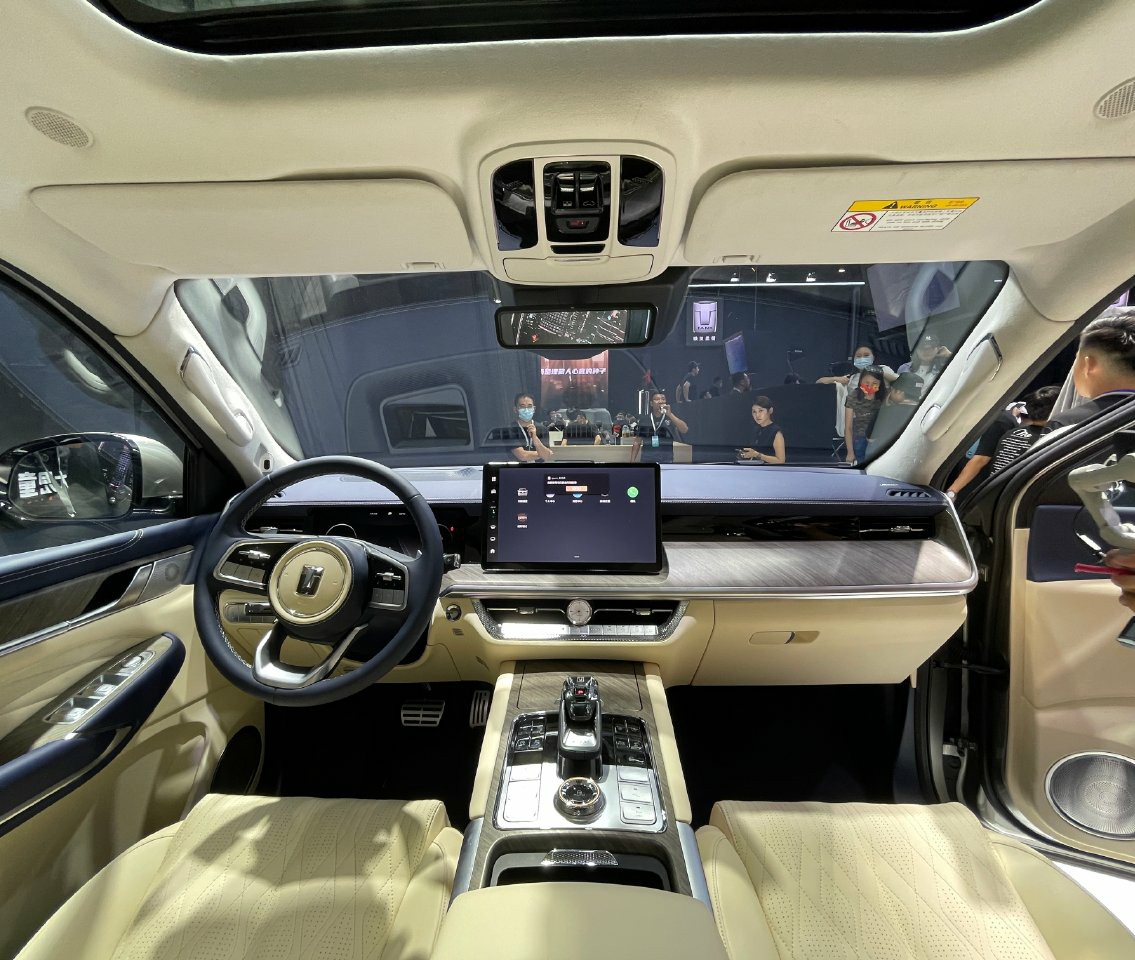
Interior

== Tank 500 Hi4-T ==
In May 2023, GWM unveiled the Tank 500 Hi4-T, the PHEV version of Tank 500. It remained the same exterior with V6 version and equipped with a 2.0-litre turbocharged four-cylinder petrol engine, paired with a nine-speed Hydraulic Automatic Transmission (9HAT) and four-wheel drive system.

According to GWM, the 9HAT transmission is China's first longitudinal 9-speed hydraulic automatic transmission with P2 hybrid layout. A 150 kW electric motor is integrated into 9HAT transmission and placed between the engine and the gearbox, which is called P2 layout. A 37.1 kWh battery is placed at the rear of the chassis.

== Markets ==
=== Australia ===
The Tank 500 was introduced in Australia in January 2024, with prices announced in February 2024. It is available in two trim levels: Lux and Ultra. It is available in the HEV variant, powered by a 2.0-litre turbocharged petrol hybrid engine. In October 2025, the 2.0-litre turbocharged petrol plug-in hybrid engine with a single motor (Hi4-T) was introduced in Australia only for the Ultra trim. In August 2026, the 3.0-litre GW4F30 turbo-diesel was introduced to the line-up for the Lux and Vanta trims.

=== Brunei ===
The Tank 500 was introduced in Brunei on 3 January 2025 and it is offered in a sole Ultra variant powered by a 2.0-litre turbocharged petrol hybrid engine.

=== Indonesia ===
The Tank 500 was introduced in Indonesia at the 30th Gaikindo Indonesian International Auto Show in August 2023, alongside the Haval H6, Haval Jolion and Ora 03, marking GWM's entry to the Indonesian market. Pricing was formally revealed with limited sales at the 2024 BCA Expoversary on 2 March 2024. Official sales were commenced on 21 March 2024. Fully imported from Thailand, it is powered by a 2.0-litre turbocharged petrol hybrid engine and is only offered in a sole HEV variant. In February 2026, the 2.4-litre turbocharged diesel engine, with the option between two-wheel drive and four-wheel drive, was introduced in Indonesia at the 33rd Indonesia International Motor Show.

=== Malaysia ===
The Tank 500 was introduced in Malaysia at the 2024 Kuala Lumpur International Mobility Show in December 2024. It was launched on 8 May 2025, fully imported from Thailand, it is powered by a 2.0-litre turbocharged petrol hybrid engine and is only offered in the sole HEV variant.

=== Mexico ===
The Tank 500 was launched in Mexico on 27 March 2025, with two variants: Luxury and Black Edition, both variants are powered by a 3.0-litre twin-turbocharged petrol engine.

=== Russia ===
Russia became second foreign market to market the Tank 500 after Saudi Arabia, it was launched in March 2023. Initially it had been offered in two trims: Adventure and Premium, powered by 3.0-litre V6 twin-turbo petrol engine with output lowered to 299 hp due to tax issues. In January 2024, GWM started to offer the Tank 500 with the Hybrid variant in a sole Urban trim. In June 2024, the Blacktrail trim was added, powered by 3.0-litre V6 with a raised output to 349 hp and equipped with an additional 50 litres fuel tank giving it extended range 1100 km before refueling.

=== South Africa ===
The Tank 500 was launched in South Africa on 14 August 2024, alongside the GWM P500 pick up. Only offered in a sole Ultra Luxury variant powered by a 2.0-litre turbocharged petrol hybrid engine.

In September 2026, the 3.0-litre GW4F30 turbo-diesel engine was introduced in South Africa to replace the 2.0-litre turbocharged petrol hybrid as the sole engine option for the Tank 500 and also became available with three variants: Super Luxury (4x2), Ultra Luxury (4x4) and Overland (4x4).

=== Thailand ===
The Tank 500 was previewed in Thailand at the 38th Thailand International Motor Expo on 29 November 2021, and officially launched on 28 September 2023. At launch, it was offered exclusively as a HEV, powered by a 2.0-litre turbocharged petrol hybrid engine, in two trim levels: Pro and Ultra. It is locally assembled at GWM's facility in Rayong.

In July 2025, a 2.4-litre turbocharged diesel engine was added to the Pro and Ultra trims, offered with a choice of two-wheel or four-wheel drive. The diesel Ultra variant could be optioned with the Black Warrior exterior accessory package, while the HEV Pro variant was discontinued.

In August 2026, a 3.0-litre GW4F30 turbo-diesel engine was introduced for the Ultra trim, available with either rear-wheel or four-wheel drive.

== Powertrain ==
Power is provided by a 3.0-litre turbocharged V6 making 349 hp (260 kW; 354 PS) and 369 lb⋅ft (500 N⋅m; 51 kg⋅m) of torque mated to a 9-speed automatic transmission.

The Tank 500 Hi4-T has 2.0-litre turbocharged four-cylinder outputting 300 kW (402 hp; 408 PS) and 750 N⋅m (553 lb⋅ft; 76 kg⋅m), 9HAT gearbox. 0–100-kilometre-per-hour (0–62 mph) acceleration of 6.9 seconds and WLTC 2.3 L/100 km (43.5 km/L; 122.8 mpg_{‑imp}; 102.3 mpg_{‑US}).

Model	Engine	Motor	Power	Transmission	Torque
Petrol	3.0L (2993cc) E30Z V6 (twin-turbo petrol)	—	265 kW (355 hp)	9-speed automatic （9AT）	500 N⋅m (369 lb⋅ft) at 1500-4500 rpm
Diesel	2.4L (2370cc) E24D I4 (VGT diesel)	—	137 kW (184 hp)	9-speed automatic （9AT）	480 N⋅m (354 lb⋅ft) at 1500-2500 rpm
Diesel	3.0L (2994cc) 4F30 I4 (VGT diesel)	—	170 kW (228 hp)	9-speed automatic （9AT）	620 N⋅m (457 lb⋅ft) at 1400-2400 rpm
HEV	2.0L (1998cc) E20N I4 (turbo petrol)	Single motor (TZ290XH003 3-in-1 motor drive system)	Engine: 180 kW (241 hp)	9-speed hybrid automatic (9HAT)	Engine: 380 N⋅m (38.7 kg⋅m; 280 lb⋅ft) @ 1,700–4,000 rpm
HEV	2.0L (1998cc) E20N I4 (turbo petrol)	Single motor (TZ290XH003 3-in-1 motor drive system)	Motor: 78 kW (105 hp; 106 PS)	9-speed hybrid automatic (9HAT)	Motor: 268 N⋅m (27.3 kg⋅m; 198 lb⋅ft)
HEV	2.0L (1998cc) E20N I4 (turbo petrol)	Single motor (TZ290XH003 3-in-1 motor drive system)	Combined: 258 kW (346 hp; 351 PS)	9-speed hybrid automatic (9HAT)	Combined: 648 N⋅m (66.1 kg⋅m; 478 lb⋅ft)
Hi4-T	2.0L (1998cc) E20NA L4 (turbo petrol)	Single motor (P2 layout)	Engine: 180 kW (241 hp)	9-speed hybrid automatic (9HAT)	750 N⋅m (553 lb⋅ft) at 1700-4000 rpm
Hi4-T	2.0L (1998cc) E20NA L4 (turbo petrol)	Single motor (P2 layout)	Motor: 120 kW (161 hp)	9-speed hybrid automatic (9HAT)	750 N⋅m (553 lb⋅ft) at 1700-4000 rpm
Hi4-T	2.0L (1998cc) E20NA L4 (turbo petrol)	Single motor (P2 layout)	Combined: 300 kW (402 hp)	9-speed hybrid automatic (9HAT)	750 N⋅m (553 lb⋅ft) at 1700-4000 rpm
Hi4-Z	2.0L (1998cc) E20NB L4 (turbo petrol)	Dual motors (P2 layout)	Engine: 185 kW (248 hp)	3-speed DHT	1,195 N⋅m (881 lb⋅ft) at 1700-4000 rpm
Hi4-Z	2.0L (1998cc) E20NB L4 (turbo petrol)	Dual motors (P2 layout)	Motor: 454 kW (609 hp)	3-speed DHT	1,195 N⋅m (881 lb⋅ft) at 1700-4000 rpm
Hi4-Z	2.0L (1998cc) E20NB L4 (turbo petrol)	Dual motors (P2 layout)	Combined: 635 kW (852 hp)	3-speed DHT	1,195 N⋅m (881 lb⋅ft) at 1700-4000 rpm

== Safety ==
ANCAP test results GWM Tank 500 (2022, aligned with Euro NCAP)
Test	Points	%
Overall:	5 /5 stars	
Adult occupant:	35.38	85%
Child occupant:	46	93%
Pedestrian:	51.14	81%
Safety assist:	15.28	84%

== Sales ==
Year	China			Russia	Thailand	Indonesia	Mexico
Year	500	PHEV	Total	Russia	Thailand	Indonesia	Mexico
2022		—	22,094	—	—	—	—
2023	10,215	20,299	30,514			—	—
2024	3,487	43,256	46,743	11,666	176	441	51
2025	1,989	47,721	49,710			178	289

== See also ==
- GWM Tank
