= Fulwin =

Fulwin may refer to:

- Chery Fulwin, a product line of Chery established in November 2023 to market plug-in hybrid vehicles
- Chery Fulwin, a 1999–2006 Chinese subcompact sedan
- Chery Fulwin 2, a 2009–2019 Chinese subcompact car
- DFSK C-Series, a 2009-present Chinese mini truck/van series, truck variant sold in Taiwan as DFSK Gold Fulwin and Grand Fulwin
- DFSK K-Series, a 2005–present Chinese mini truck/van series, truck variant sold in Taiwan as DFSK Fulwin
