= DFSK K-Series =

Chinese microvan

DFSK K07
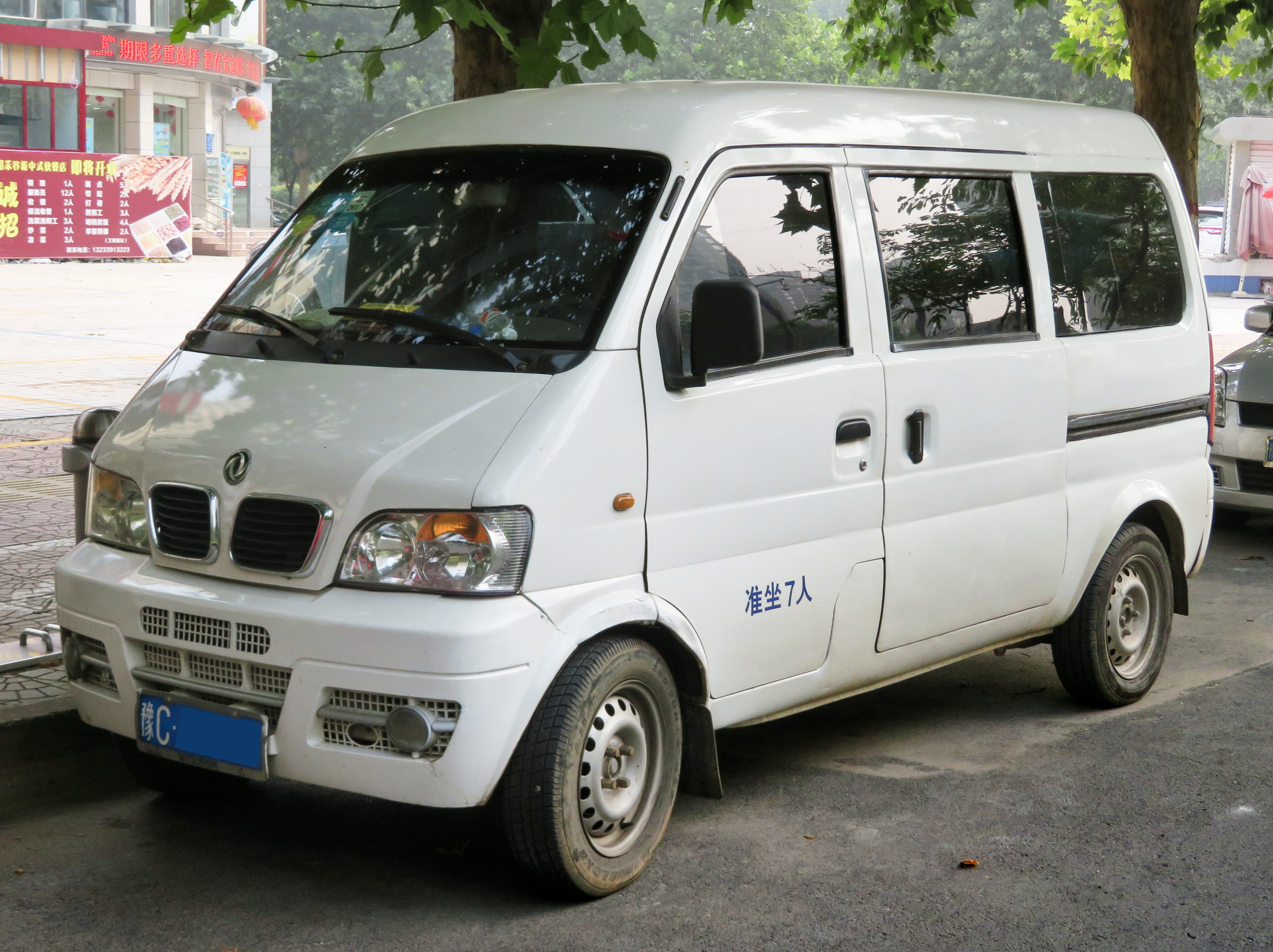

Overview
- Manufacturer: DFSK Motor
- Also called: DFSK K07; DFSK K07 II; DFSK K17; DFM Ministar; Dongfeng Huashen 103; Zamyad Dorka
- Production: 2005–present

Body and chassis
- Class: Microvan
- Body style: 5-door, 7- to 9-seater minivan 5-door, 2- to 5-seaterpanel van 2-door, 2-seater box truck

Powertrain
- Engine: 1.0 L I4 petrol engine 1.3 L I4 petrol engine
- Transmission: 5 speed manual

Dimensions
- Wheelbase: 2,515 mm (99.0 in)
- Length: 3,795 mm (149.4 in)
- Width: 1,560 mm (61.4 in)
- Height: 1,925 mm (75.8 in)

The DFSK K-Series (东风小康K系列) is a range of 5-door microvan, 2-door micro pickups, and 4-door micro pickups manufactured by DFSK Motor, a joint venture between Dongfeng Motor and Chongqing Sokon Industry.

== First Generation ==
The first generation DFSK K-Series consists of a few different body styles, including a short wheelbase van, a long wheelbase van, a single cab pickup, and a double cab pickup. In some parts of the world, all models were sold as variants under the DFM Ministar name.

=== DFSK K05 and K07 ===
The first generation vans were sold as the DFSK K05 and DFM K06/ K07 or Dongfeng Sokon K07 depending on the trim levels.

Prices of the first generation K06/ K07 can range from 27,900 yuan to 36,900 yuan in China. An updated version named the K07 II was launched later but changes were minor.

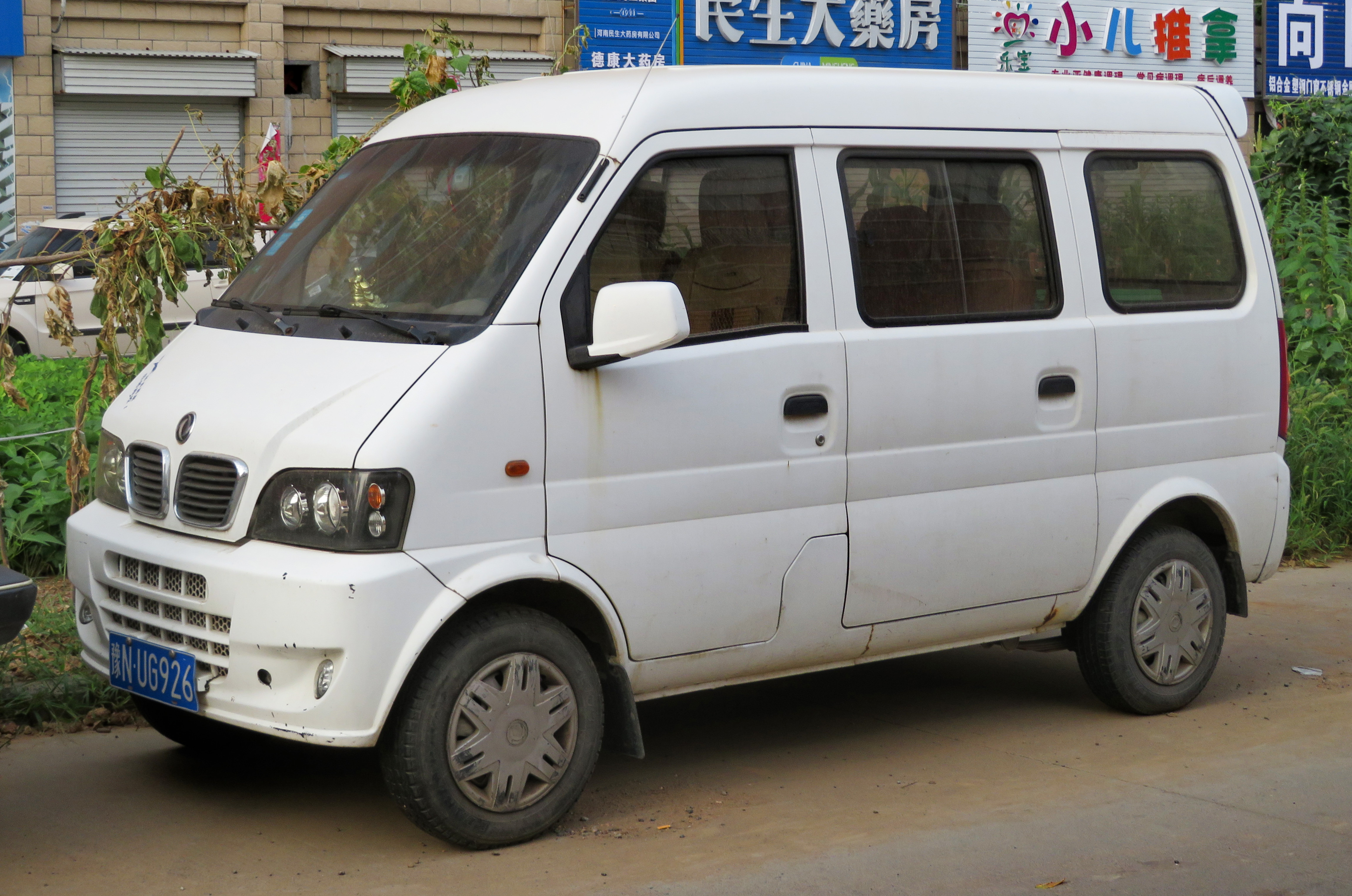
DFSK K07/K17 pre-facelift

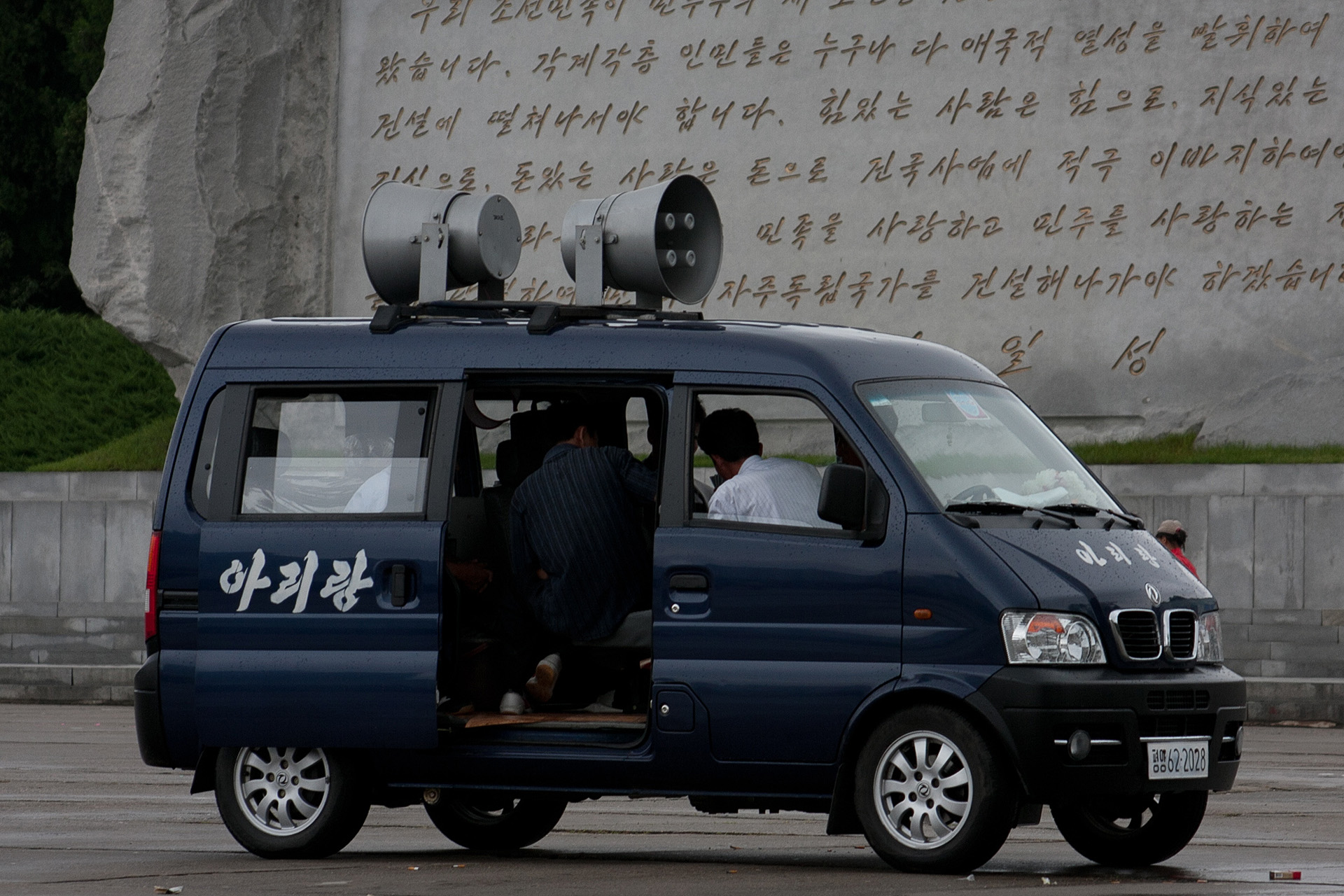
DFSK K07 Propaganda car in North Korea

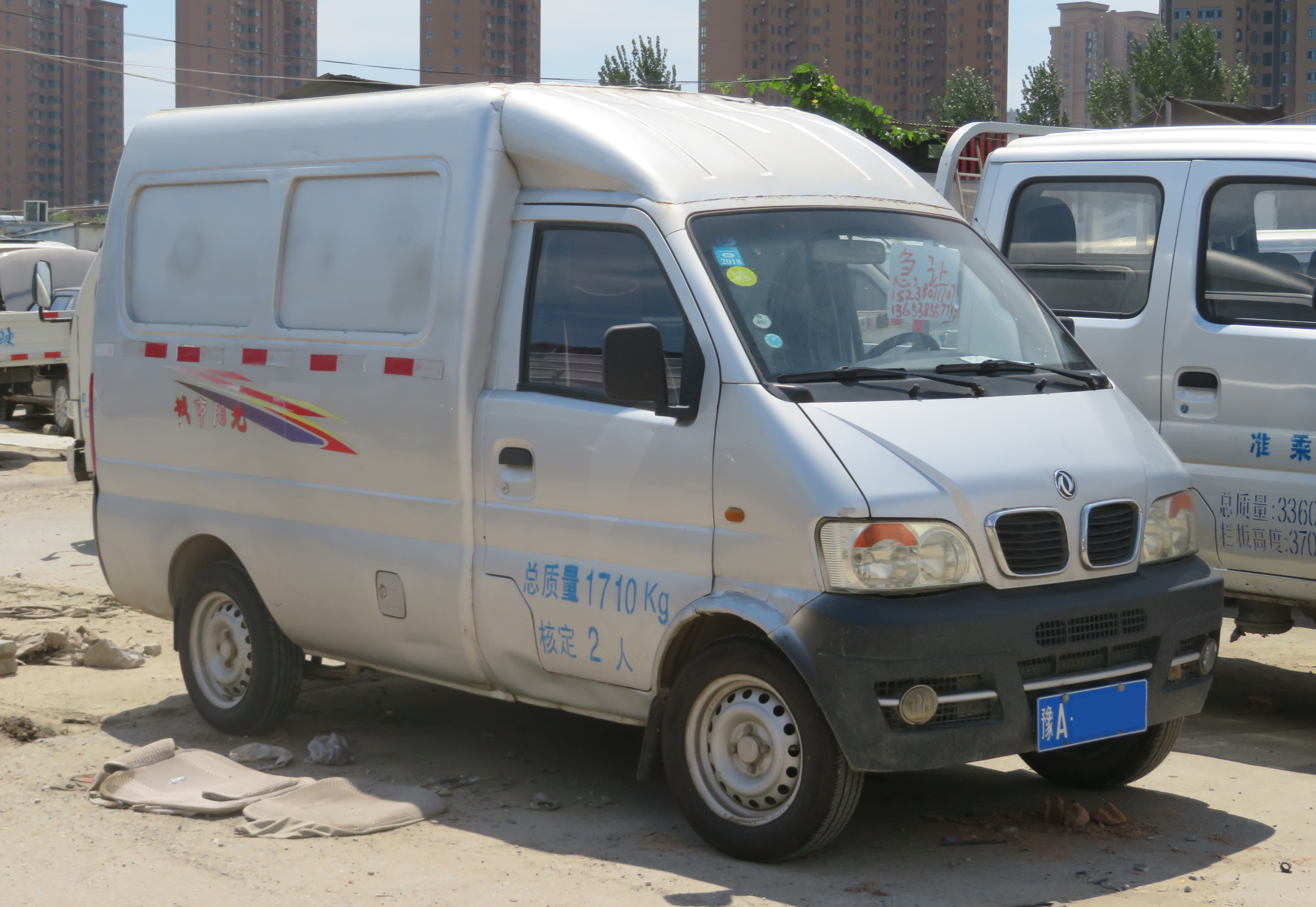
DFSK K07 Box truck

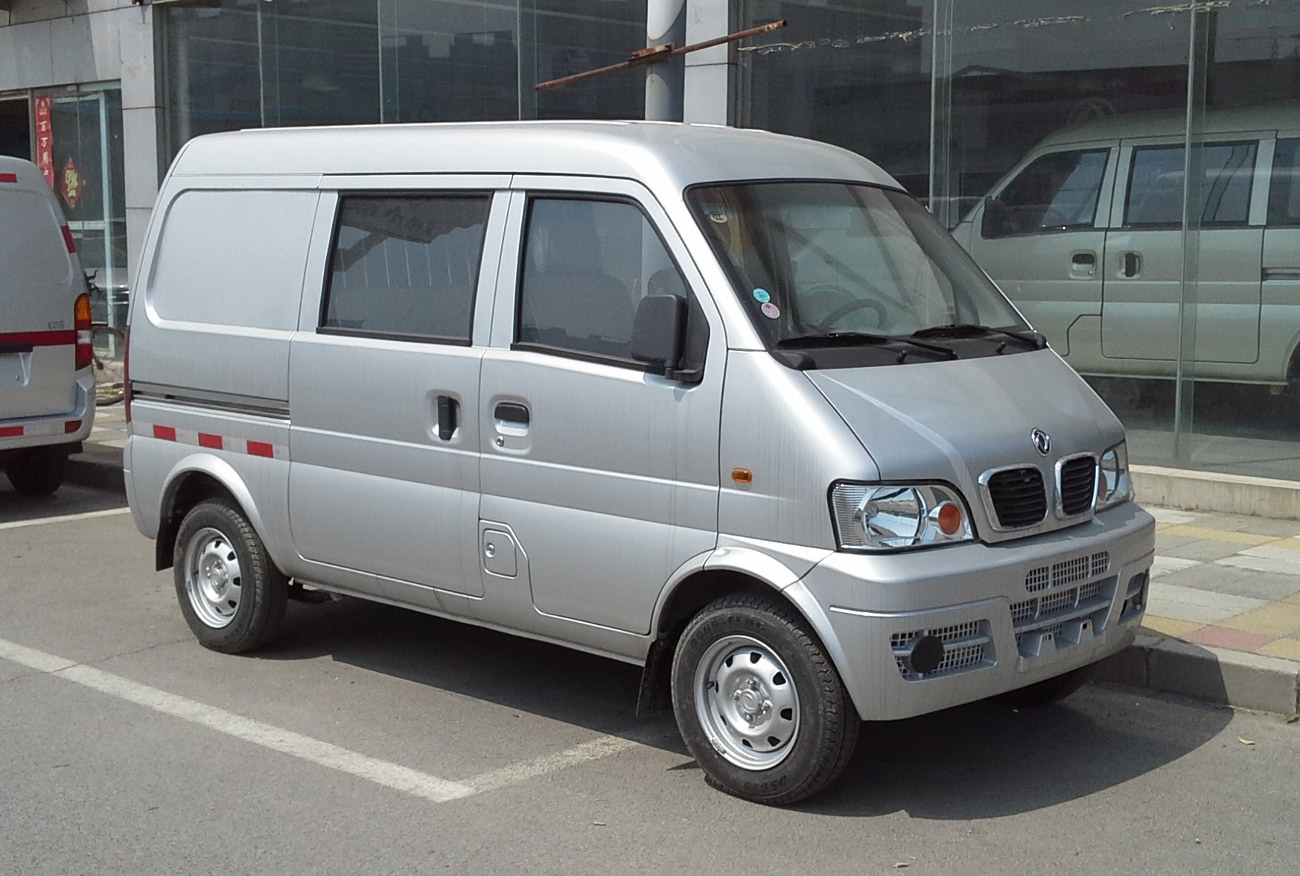
Dongfeng Sokon K05 panel van

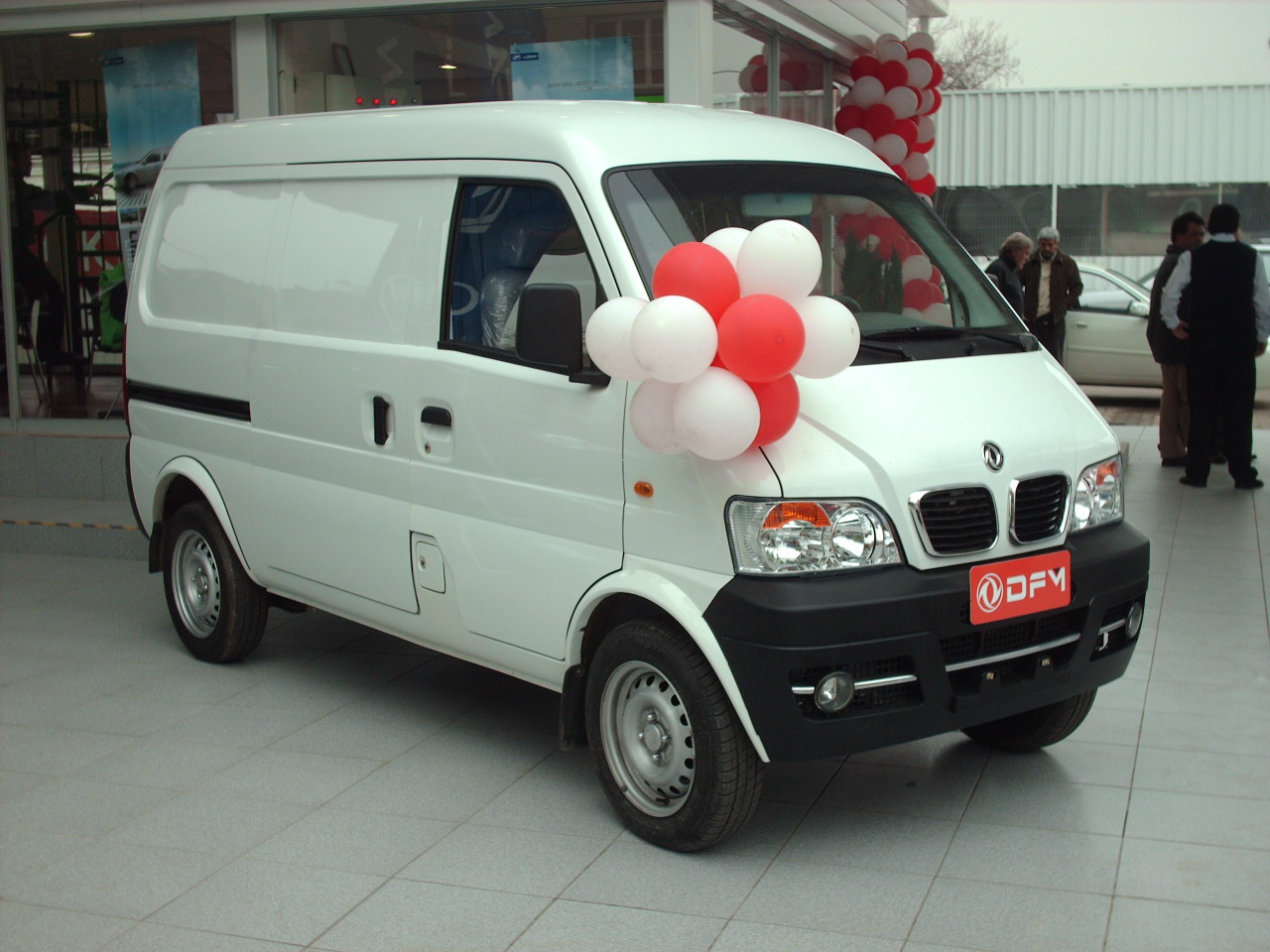
DFM Ministar panel van (Chile)

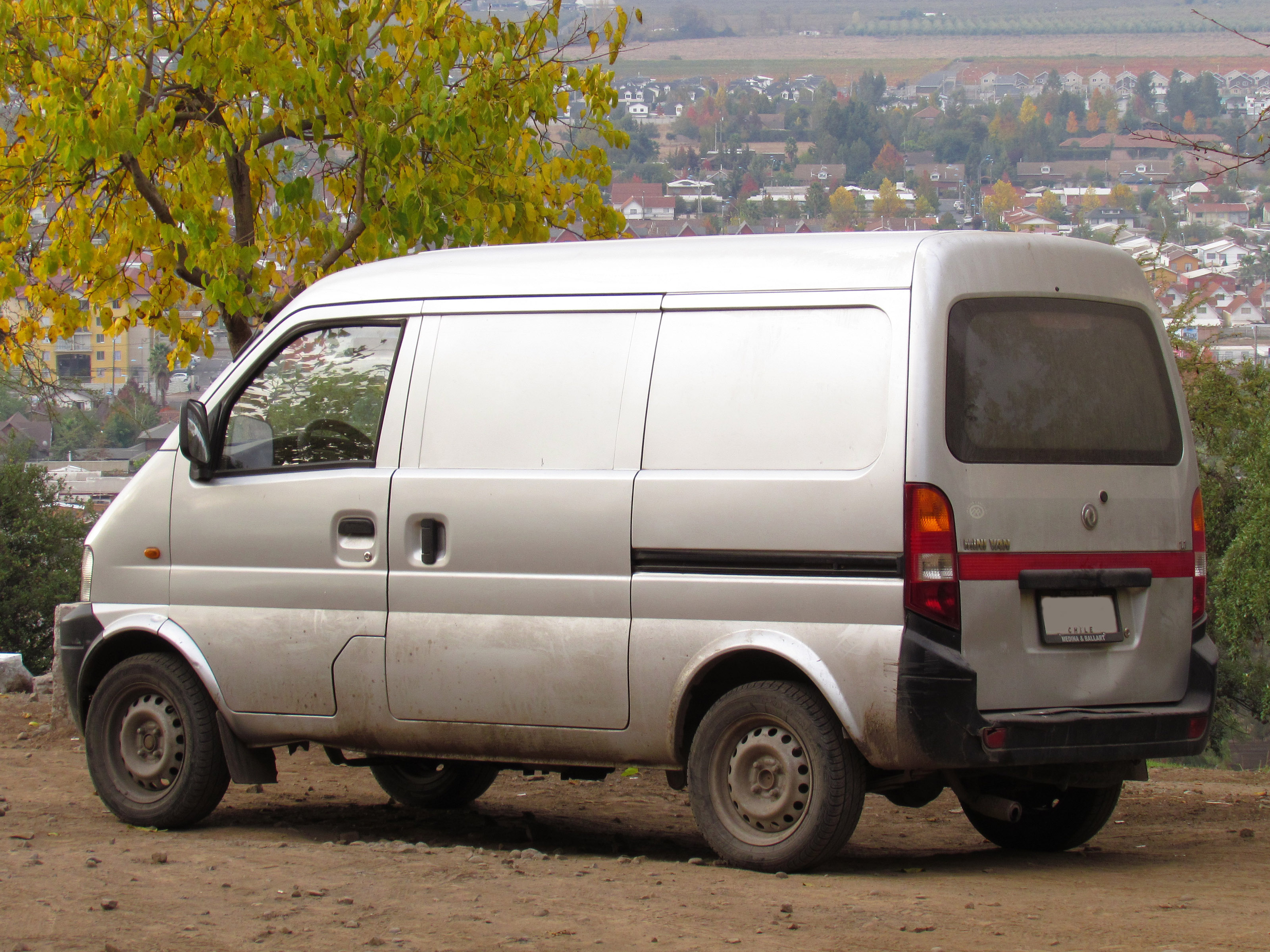
DFM Ministar panel van

=== DFSK K01 ===
The DFSK K01, DFM K01, or Dongfeng Sokon K01 is the single cab pickup and single cab cutaway cab version of the DFSK K07 microvan, with everything before the B-pillars shared. Code named EQ1020TF, the K01 was sold from 2008. A joint venture between Iranian Zamyad and DFSK has been producing the K01 since 2016 as the Zamyad Dorka.

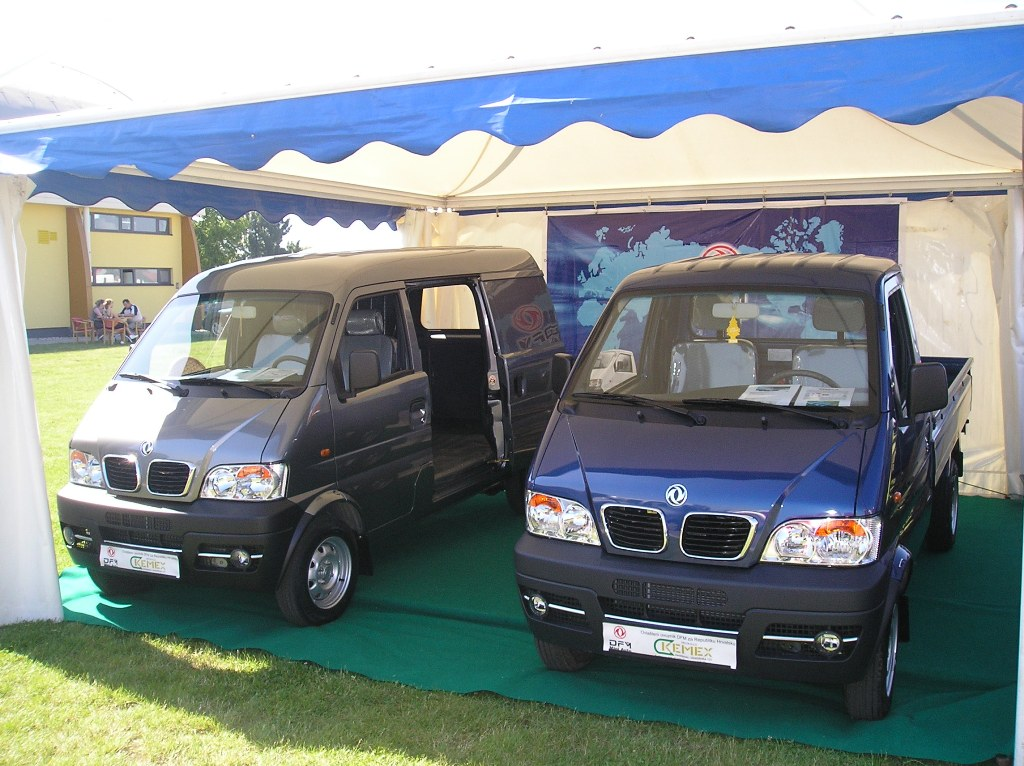
DFM K07 microvan and K01 pickup in Croatia

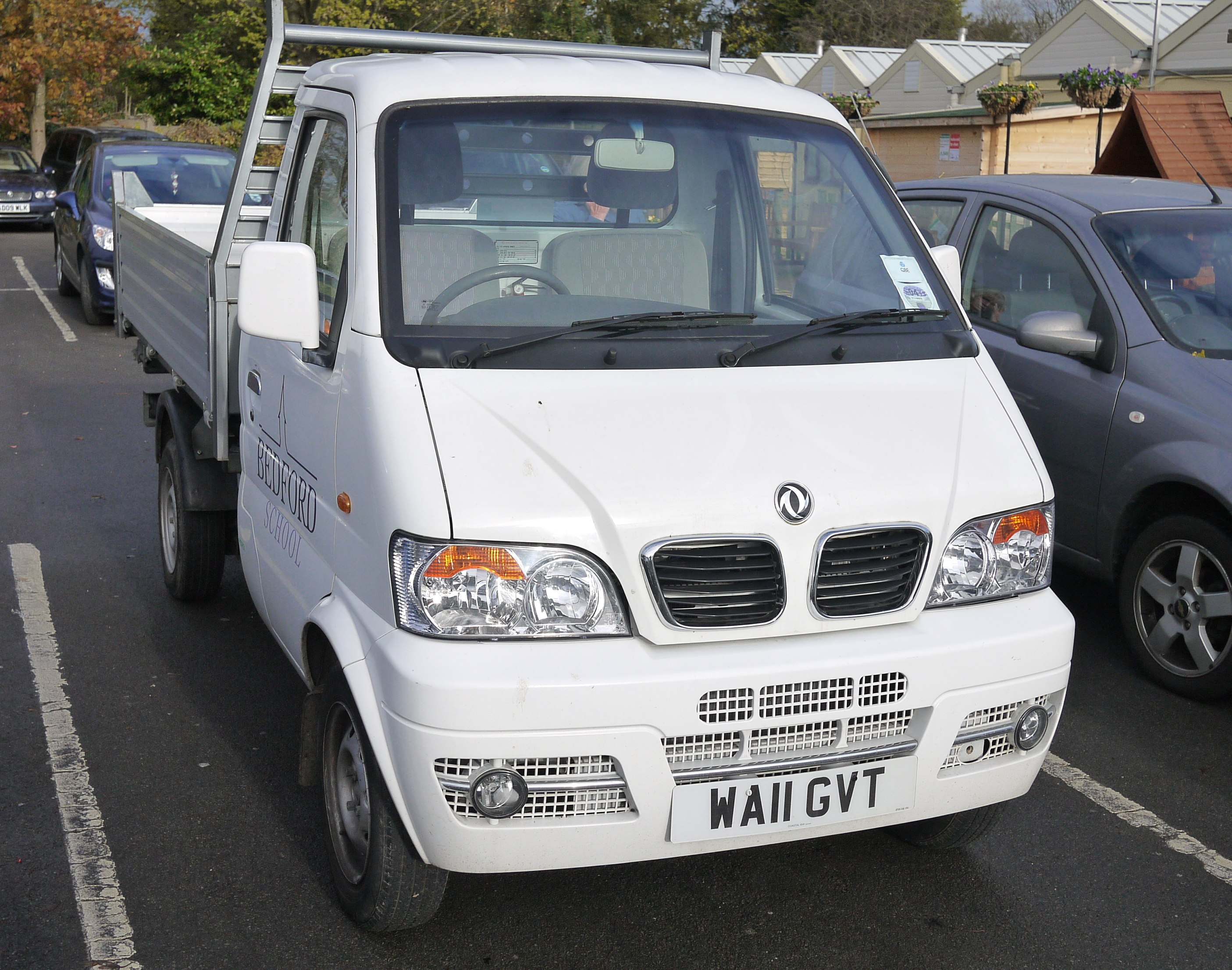
DFM K01 pickup (UK)

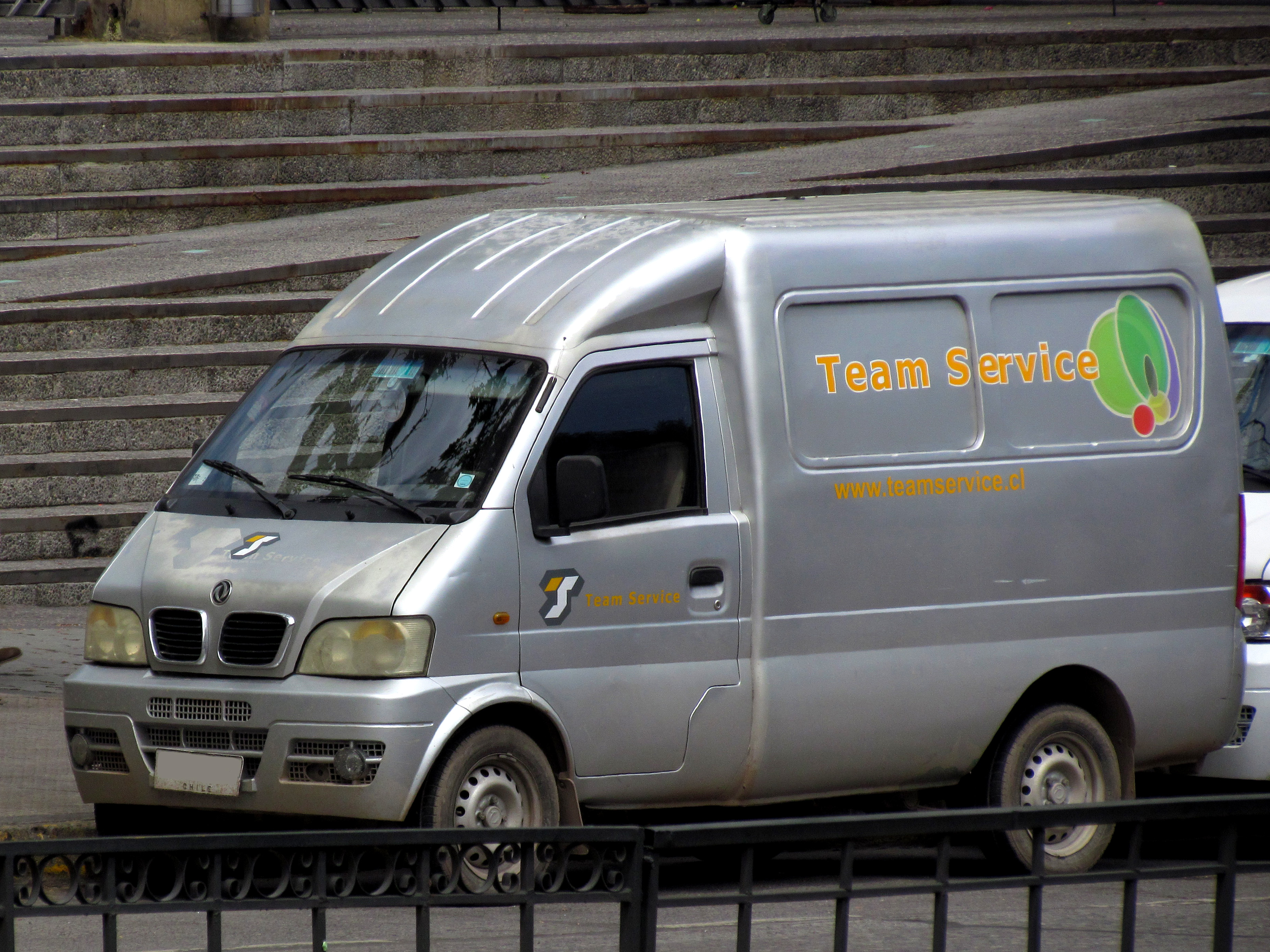
DFM Ministar box truck

=== DFSK K02 ===
The DFSK K02, DFM K02, or Dongfeng Sokon K02 is the crew cab pickup version of the DFSK K07 microvan, with everything before the B-pillars shared. Codename EQ1021NF. Engines were installed: EQ465i2-20, EQ465i2-30 and EQ474i.

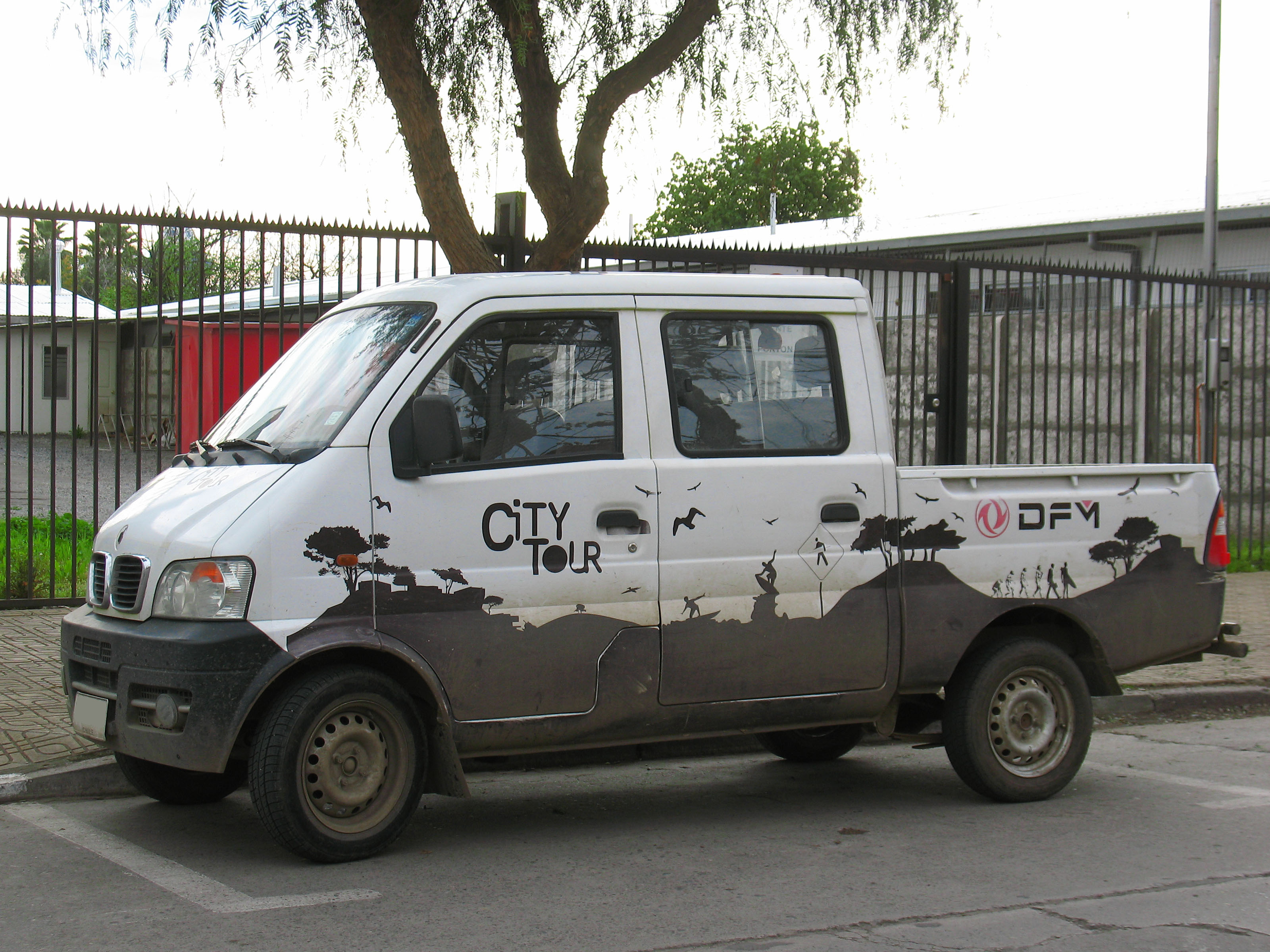
DFM K02 (Chile)

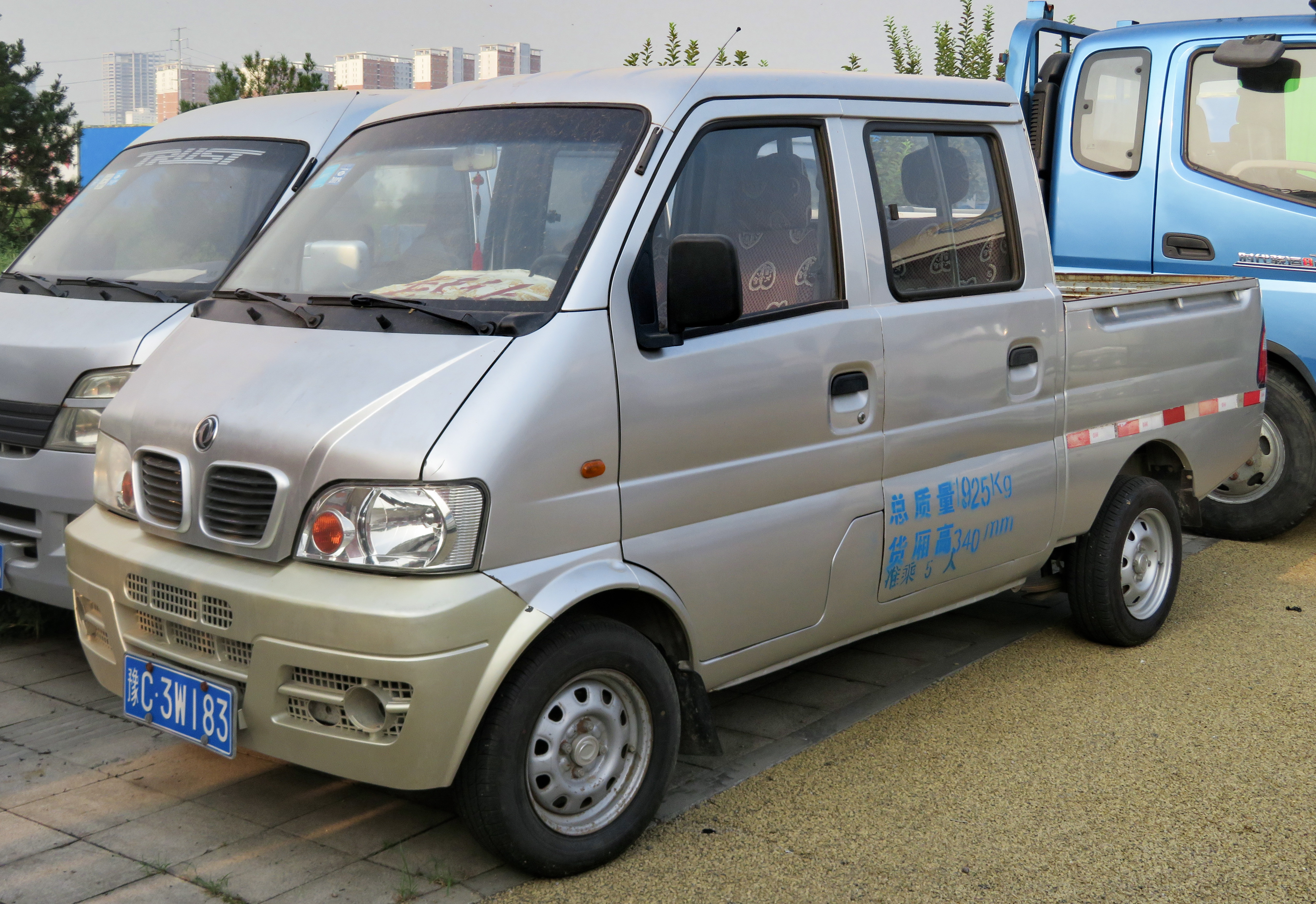
DFSK K02 crew cab

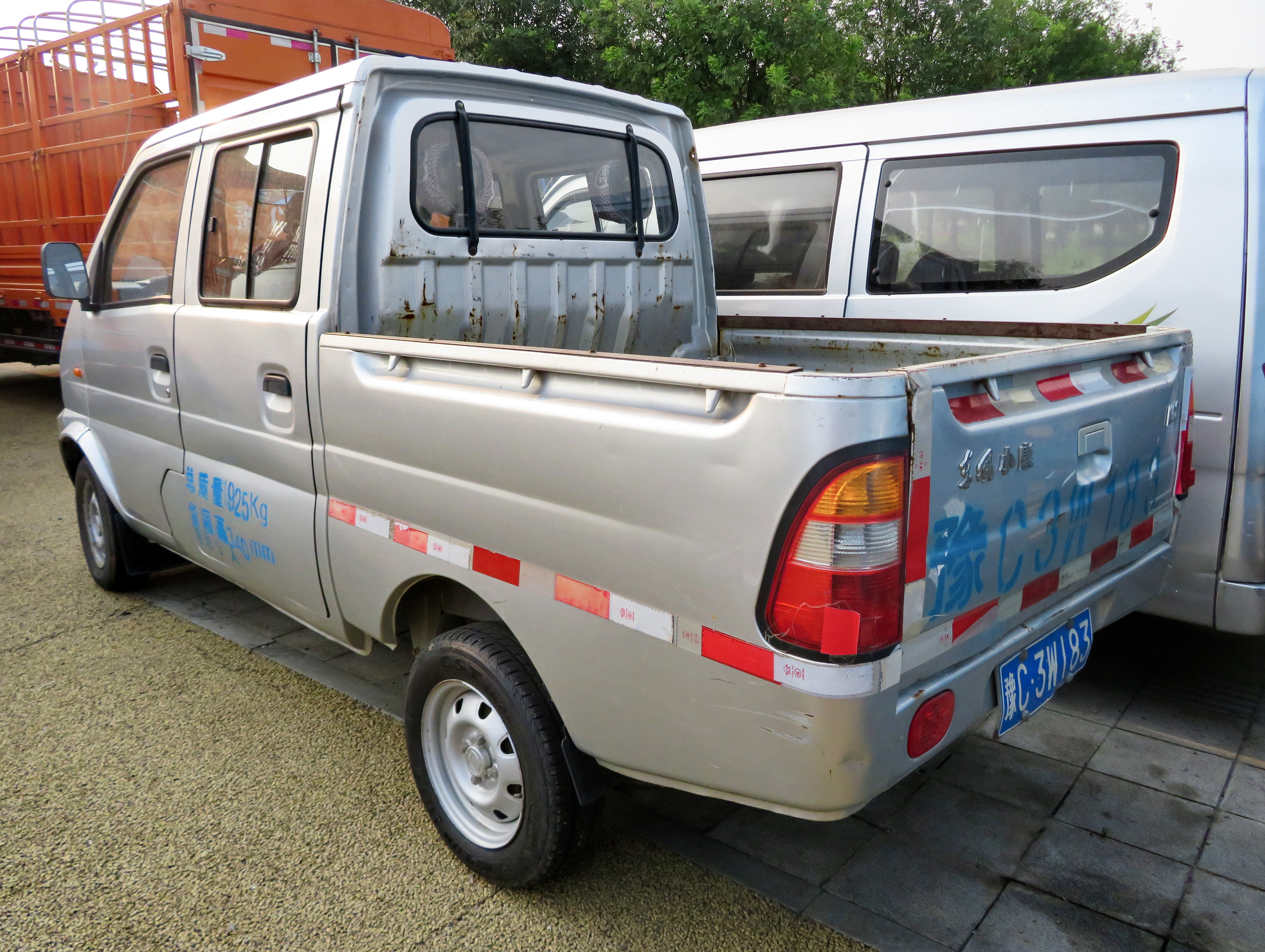
DFSK K02 crew cab rear

=== DFSK K06 ===
The DFSK K06 is the passenger box truck version of the DFSK K07 microvan, with everything before the B-pillars shared with its former. Dongfeng Sokon K06 — Cargo-passenger van for five persons with engine EQ474i, as well as options Ambulance & Police Car (Mini MPV). Codename EQ6410LF.

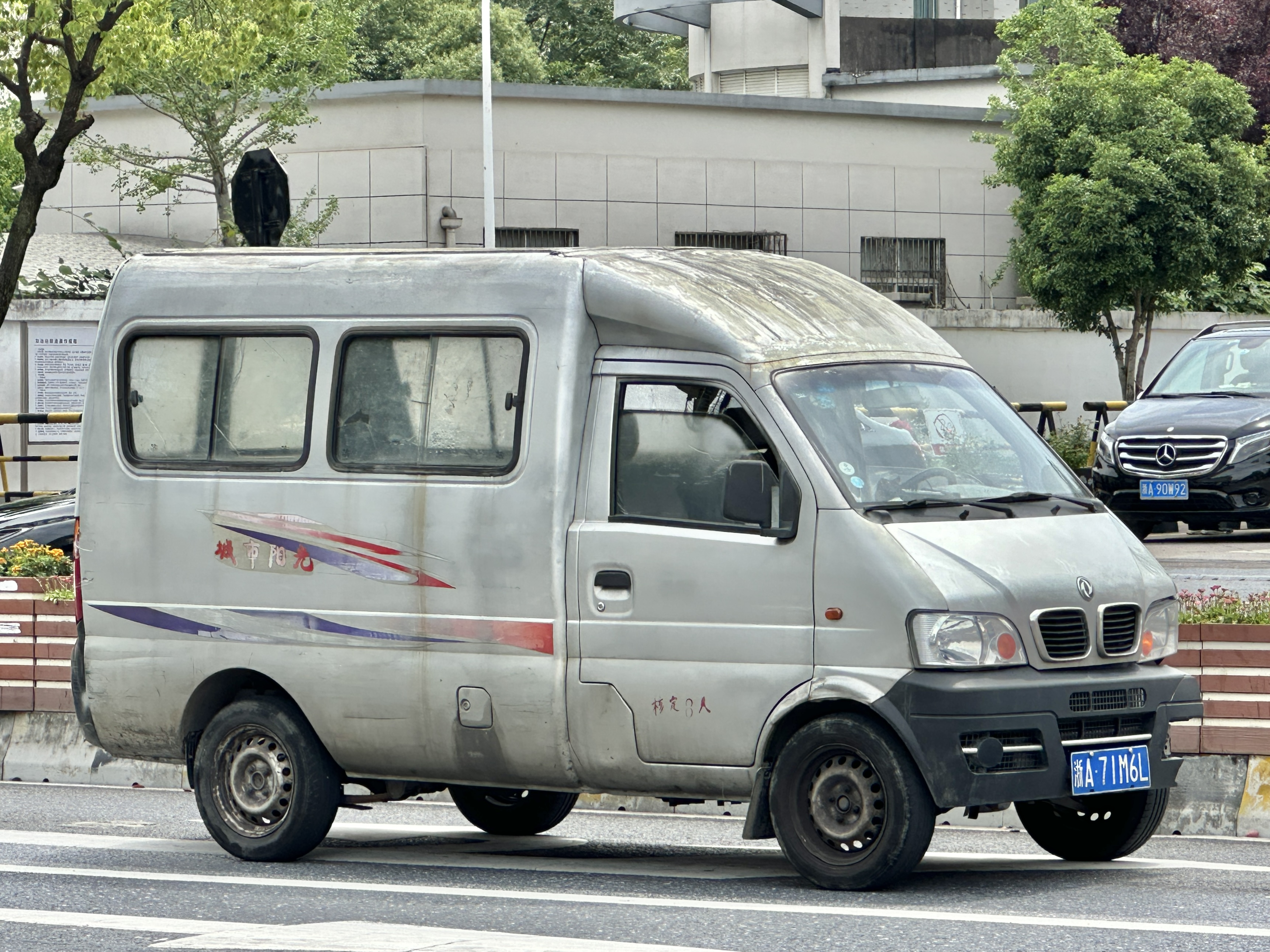
DFSK K06 Box truck

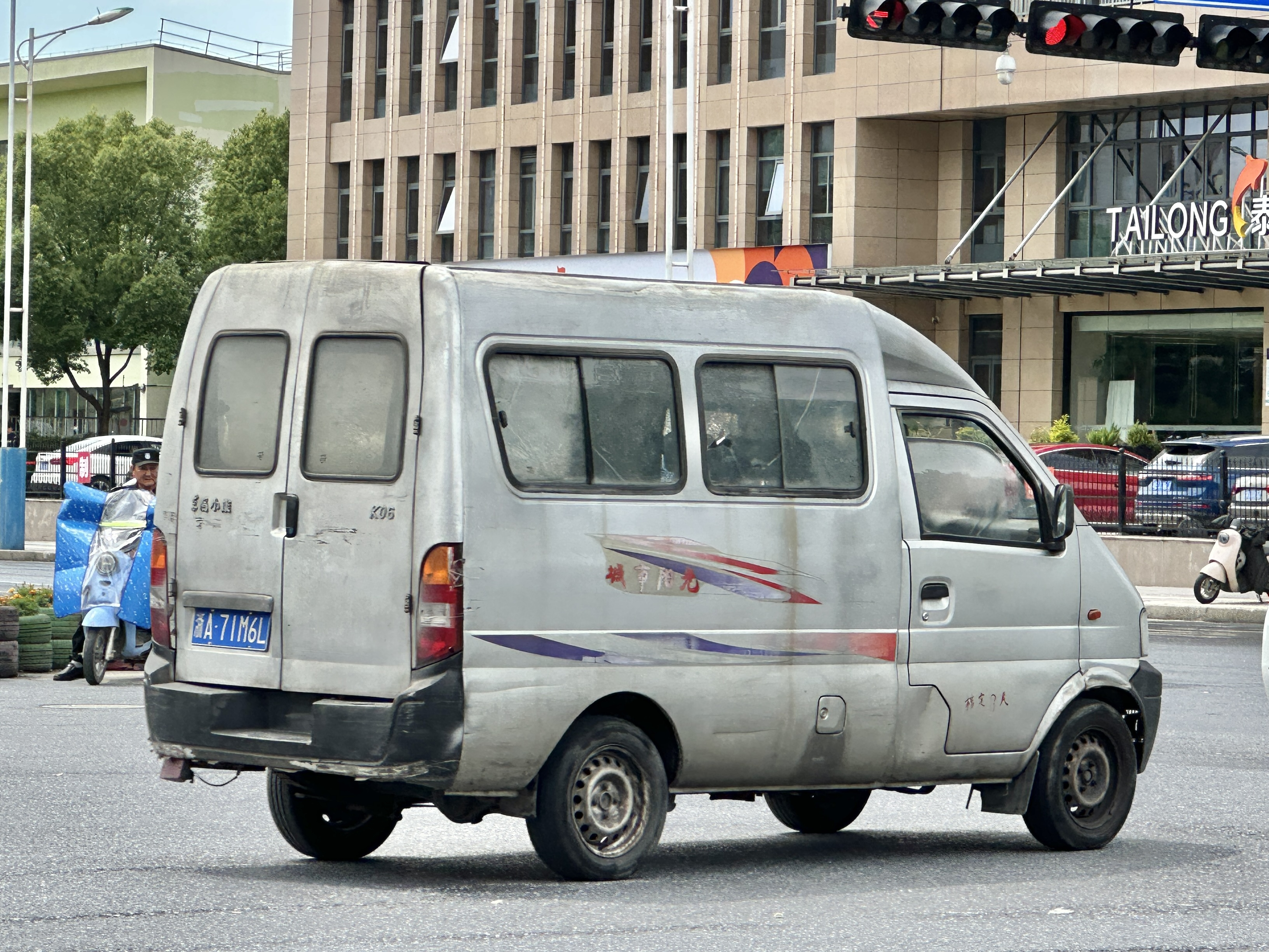
DFSK K06 rear

=== DFSK Xin K07 (New K07, 2013-present) ===
DFSK New K07
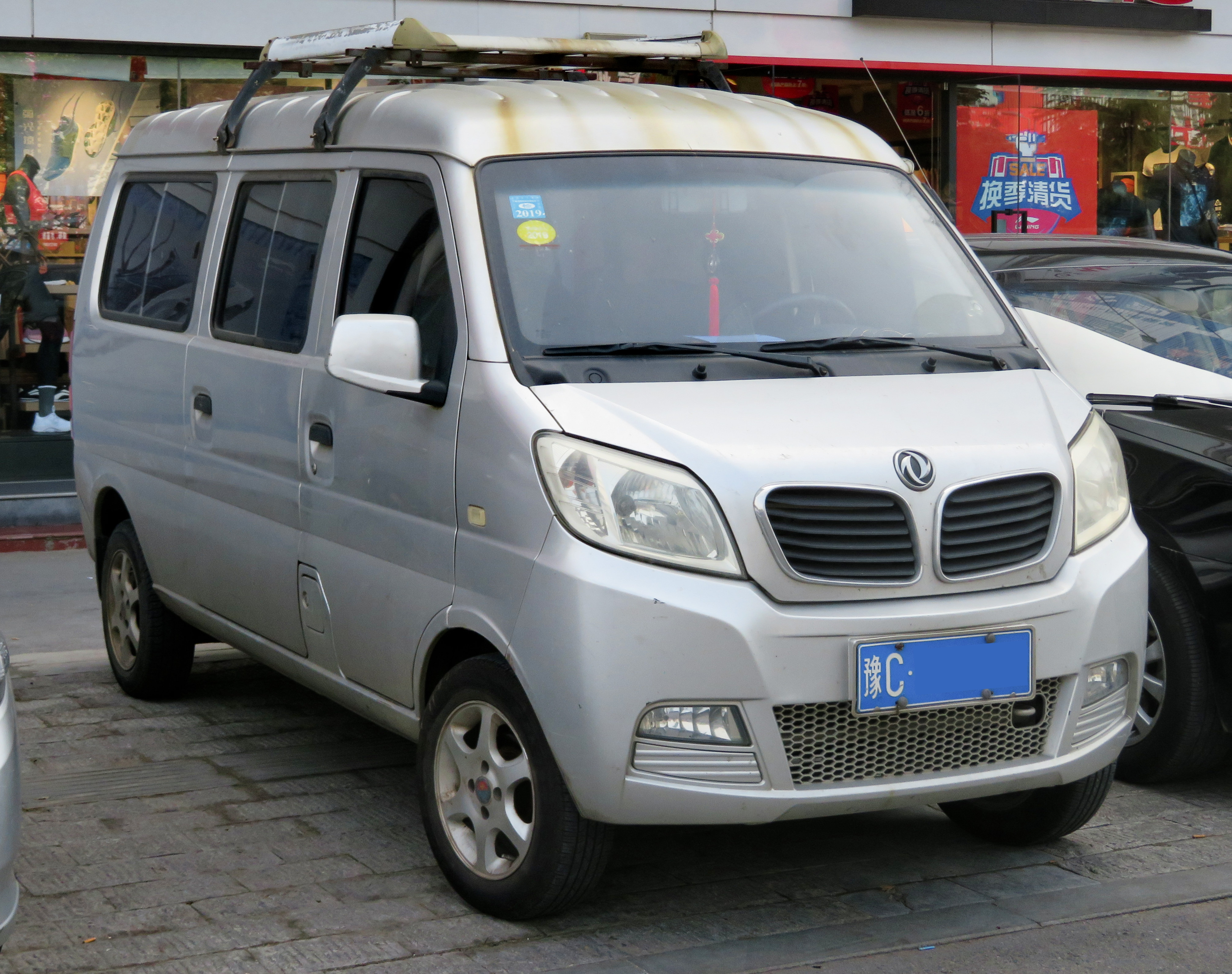

Overview
- Manufacturer: DFSK Motor
- Also called: DFSK K09
- Production: 2013–present

Body and chassis
- Class: Microvan
- Body style: 7-seater minivan

Powertrain
- Engine: 1.2 L I4
- Transmission: 5 speed manual

Dimensions
- Wheelbase: 2,760 mm (108.7 in)
- Length: 4,135 mm (162.8 in)
- Width: 1,560 mm (61.4 in)
- Height: 1,925 mm (75.8 in)

As the first major update of the K07 since its launch in 2005, the DFSK New K07 debuted in October 2013 as a single model 7-seater microvan aimed at the compact MPV market rather than the commercial vehicle market. The New K07 features hinged doors for all four side doors, replacing the sliding doors of the original K07 launched in 2005. It was sold alongside the 2005 model instead of replacing it.

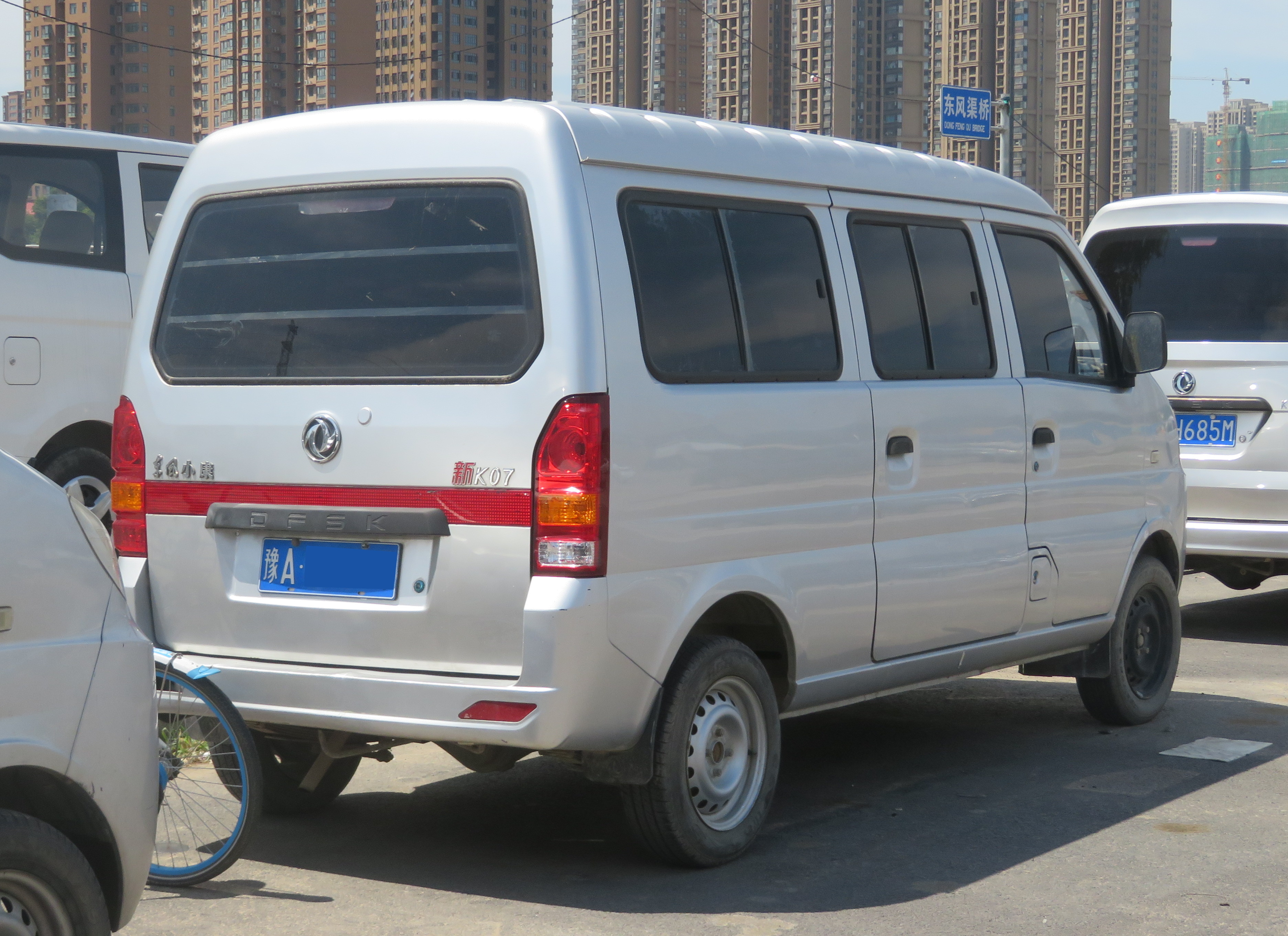
Dongfeng Sokon New K07 (rear)

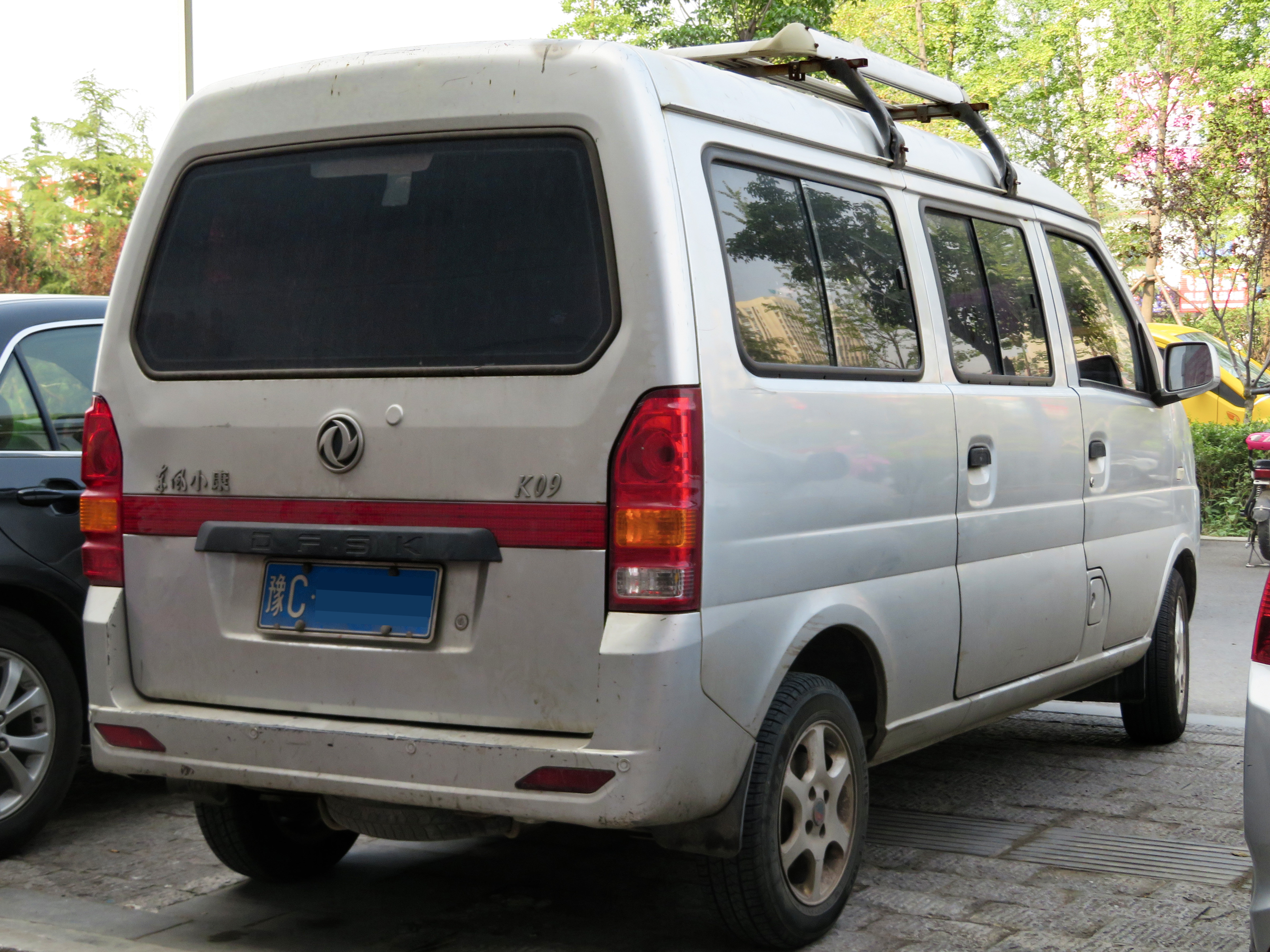
Dongfeng Sokon K09 (rear)

== Second Generation ==
=== DFSK K05S and K07S ===
DFSK K07S
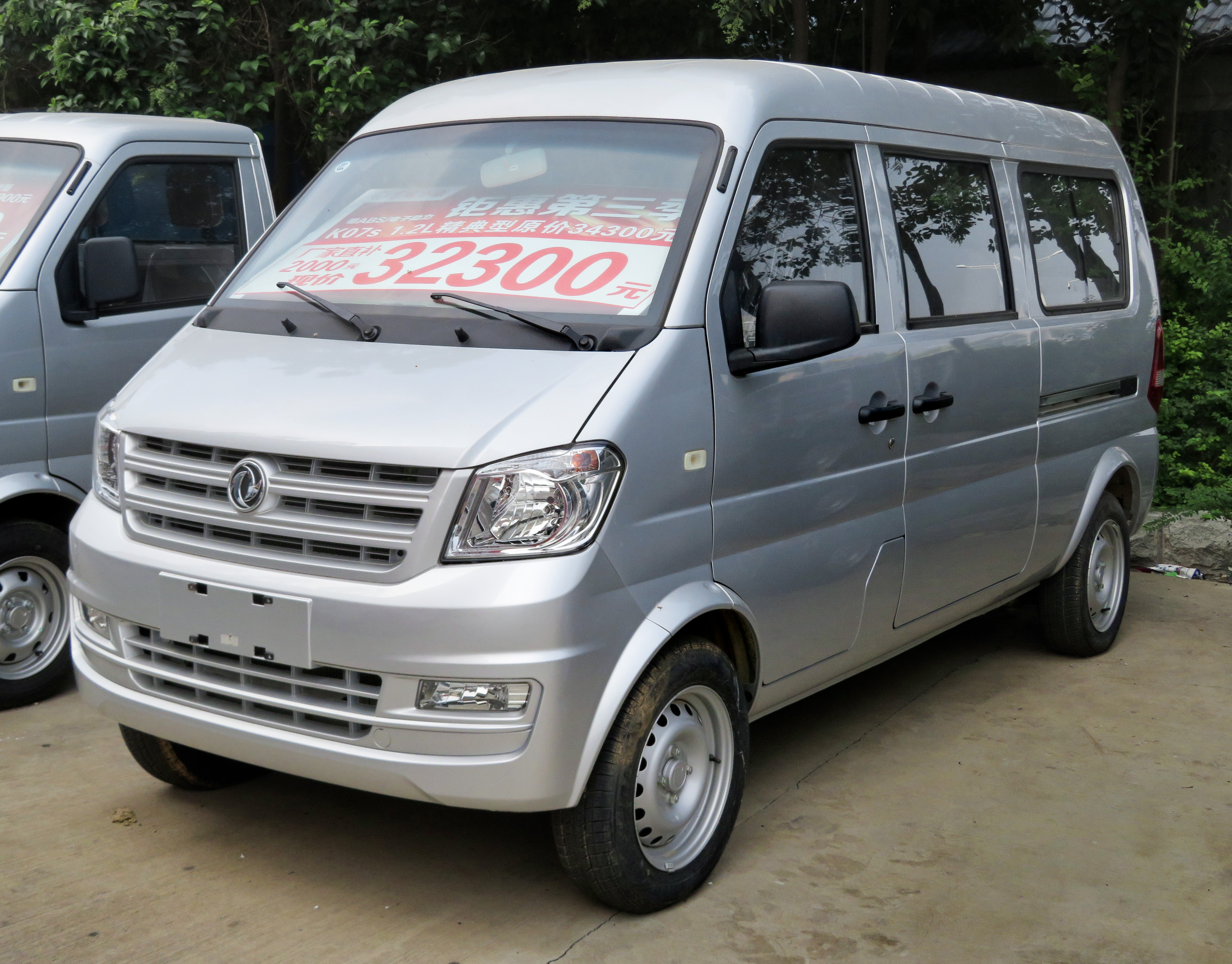

Overview
- Manufacturer: DFSK Motor
- Also called: DFSK K05S; Sokon Fulwin; Ruichi EK01S (electric truck); Giotti Victoria Gladiator; Vantage Active; Vantage eActive
- Production: 2015–present

Body and chassis
- Class: Microvan
- Body style: 5-door, 7- to 9-seater minivan 2- to 5-seater panel van

Powertrain
- Engine: 1.2 L I4; 1.0 L I4
- Transmission: 5 speed manual

Dimensions
- Wheelbase: 2,760 mm (108.7 in)
- Length: 4,070 mm (160.2 in)
- Width: 1,560 mm (61.4 in)
- Height: 1,910 mm (75.2 in)

Chronology
- Predecessor: Sokon V series

Just like the first generation DFSK K-Series, the DFSK K05S and K07S names were used depending on the trim levels. In China, prices of the K05S ranges from 28,900 yuan to 30,900 yuan, while prices of the K07S ranges from 28,900 yuan to 32,900 yuan.

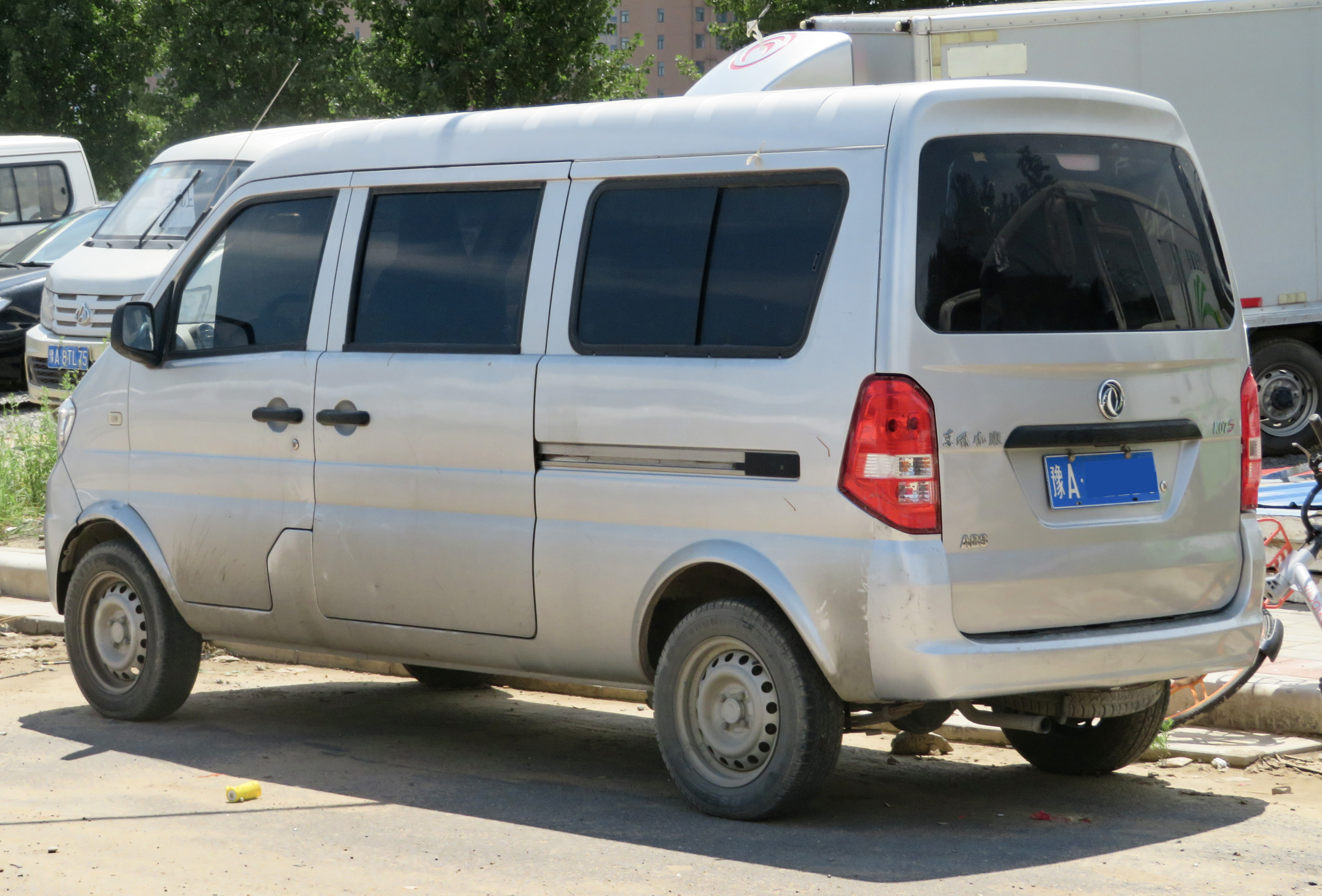
Dongfeng Xiaokang K07S (rear)

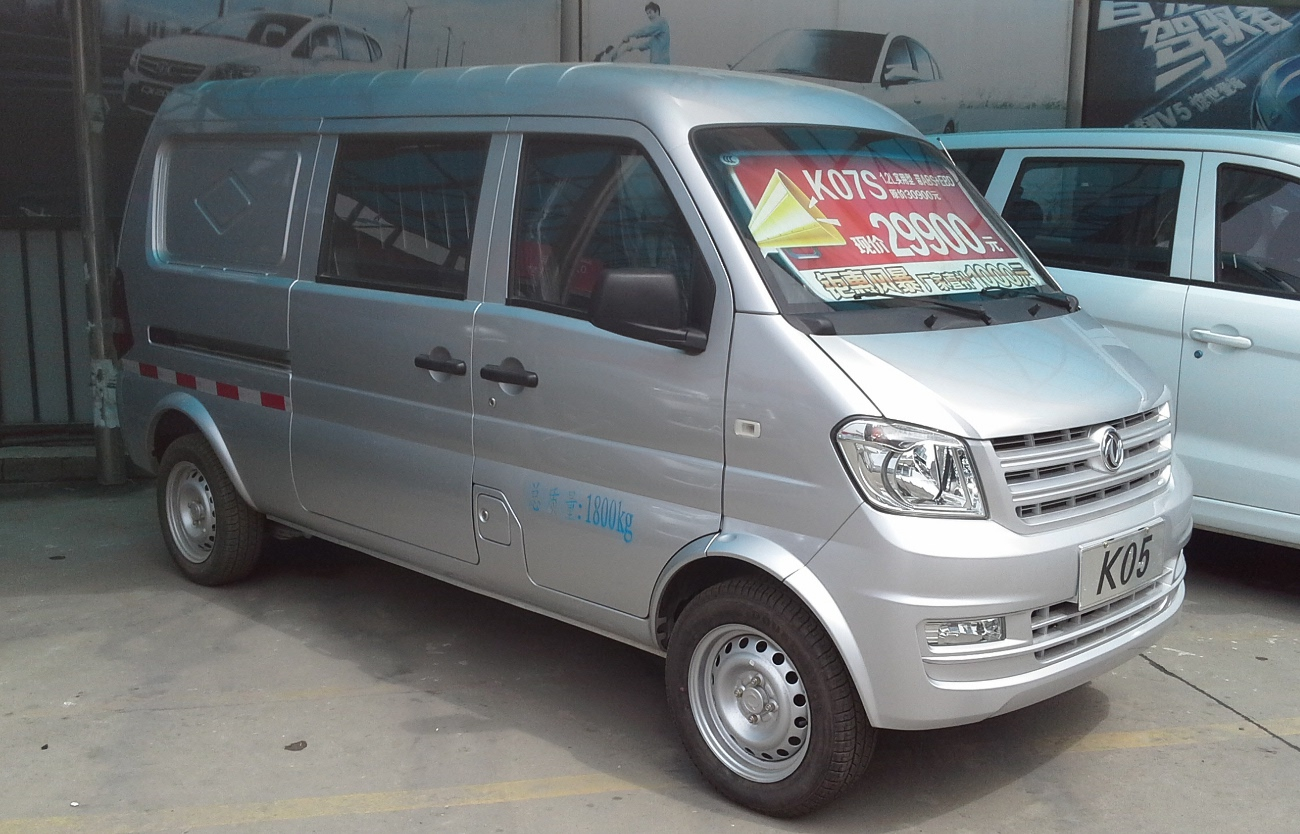
Dongfeng Sokon K05 (K07S panel van)

=== Pickup variants (DFSK K01, K02 and K02L) ===
The second generation K-Series pickups feature a different front fascia while the door panels and front fenders are still shared with the microvan models.

==== DFSK K01 and K05 ====
The DFSK K01 is the single cab pickup version of the DFSK K07S microvan, with everything before the B-pillars shared. The K05 is the sealed box truck variant sharing the same cab.

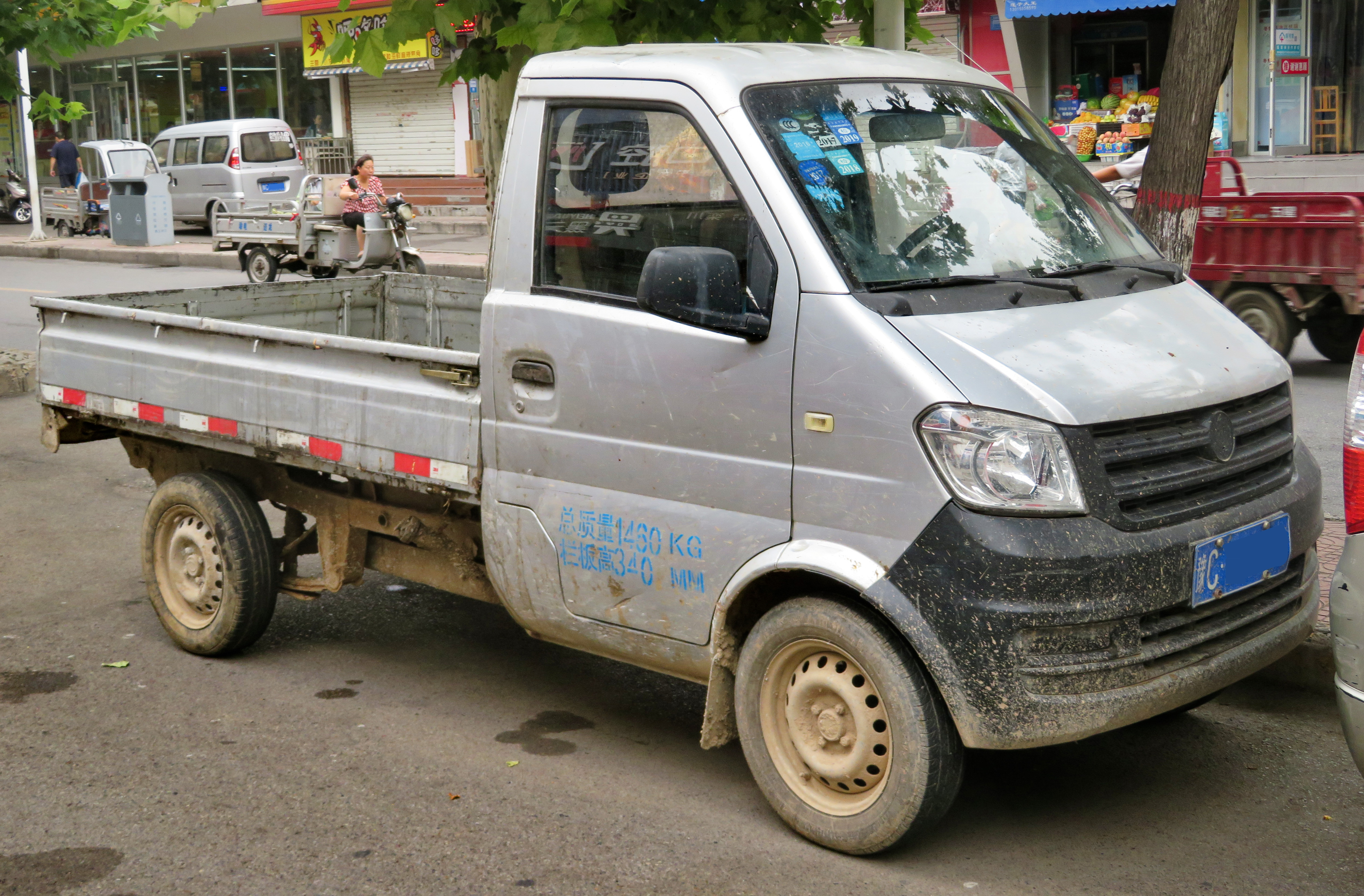
2016 DFSK K01

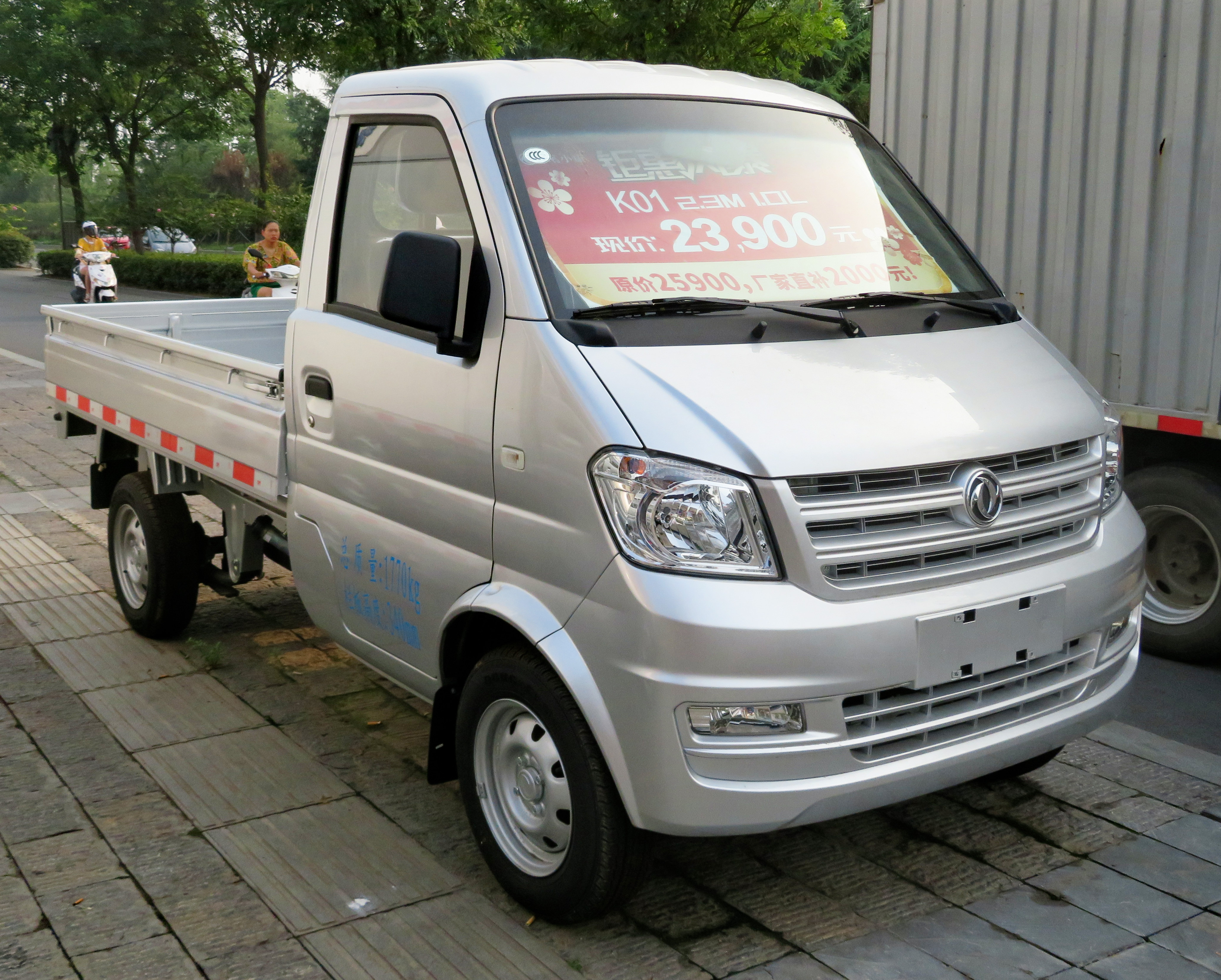
2018 DFSK K01

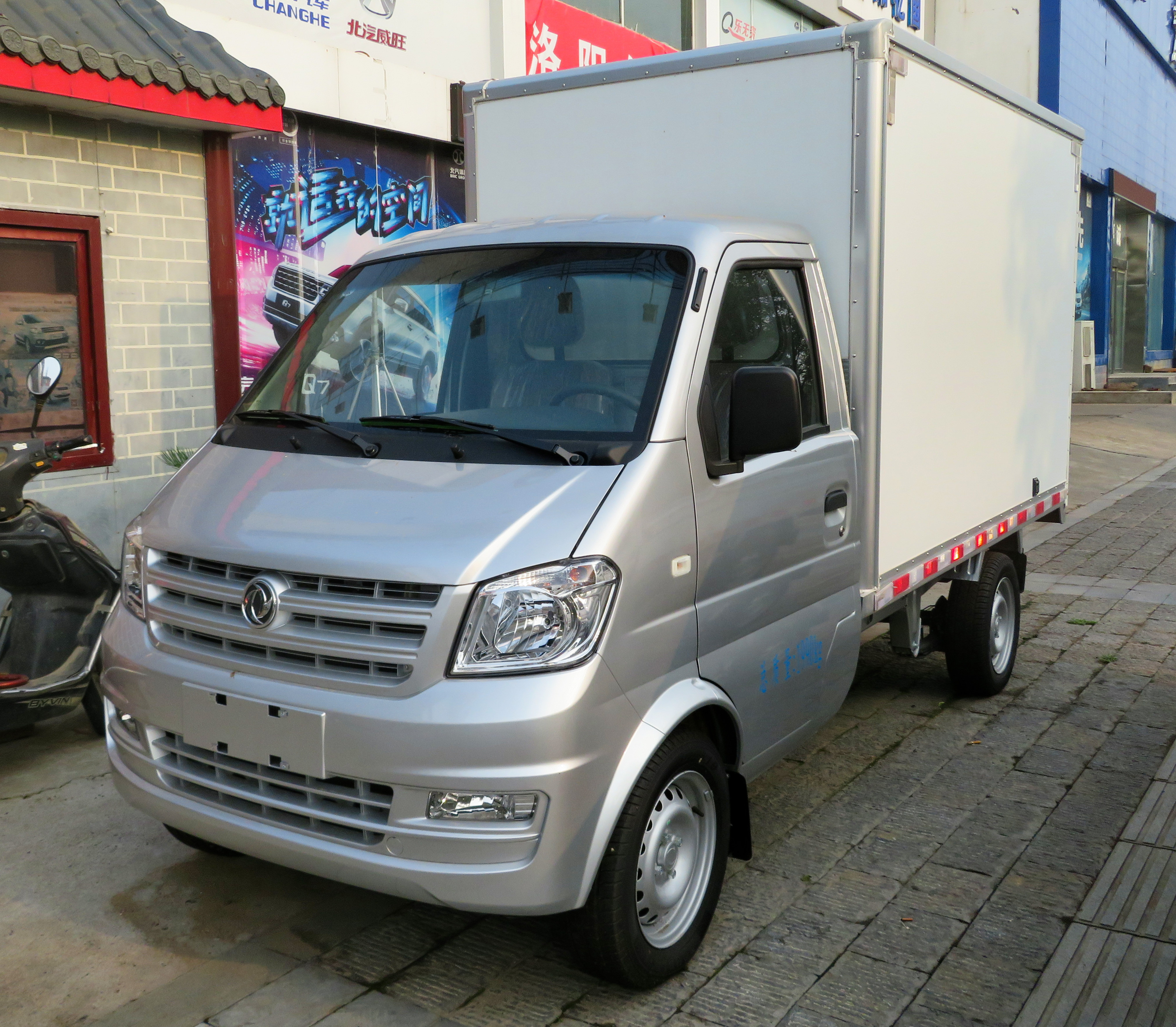
2018 DFSK K05

==== DFSK K02 and K02L ====
The DFSK K02 and K02L is the crew cab pickup version of the DFSK K07S microvan, with everything before the B-pillars shared. Electric variants are also offered overseas.

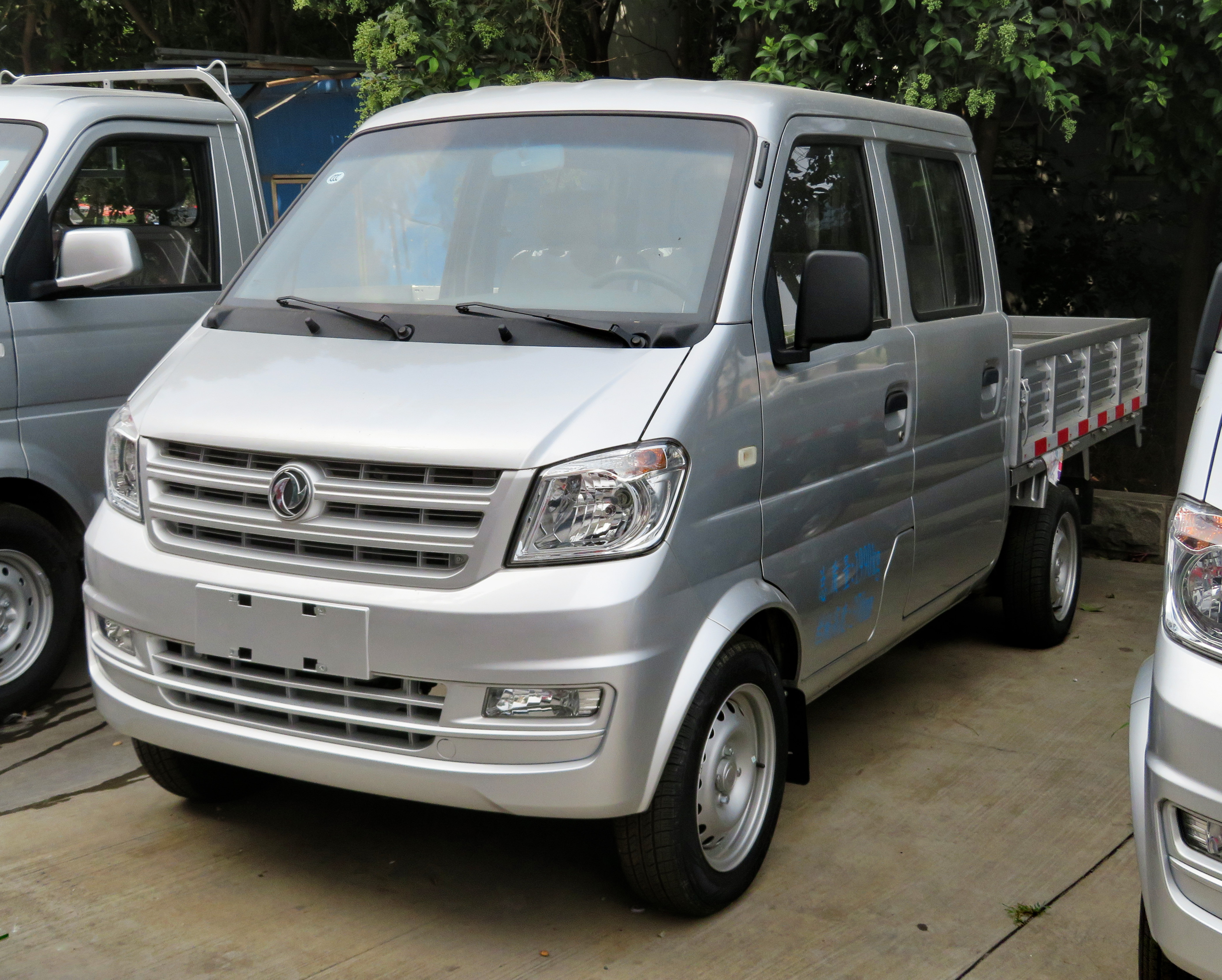
DFSK K02 (K07S crew cab)

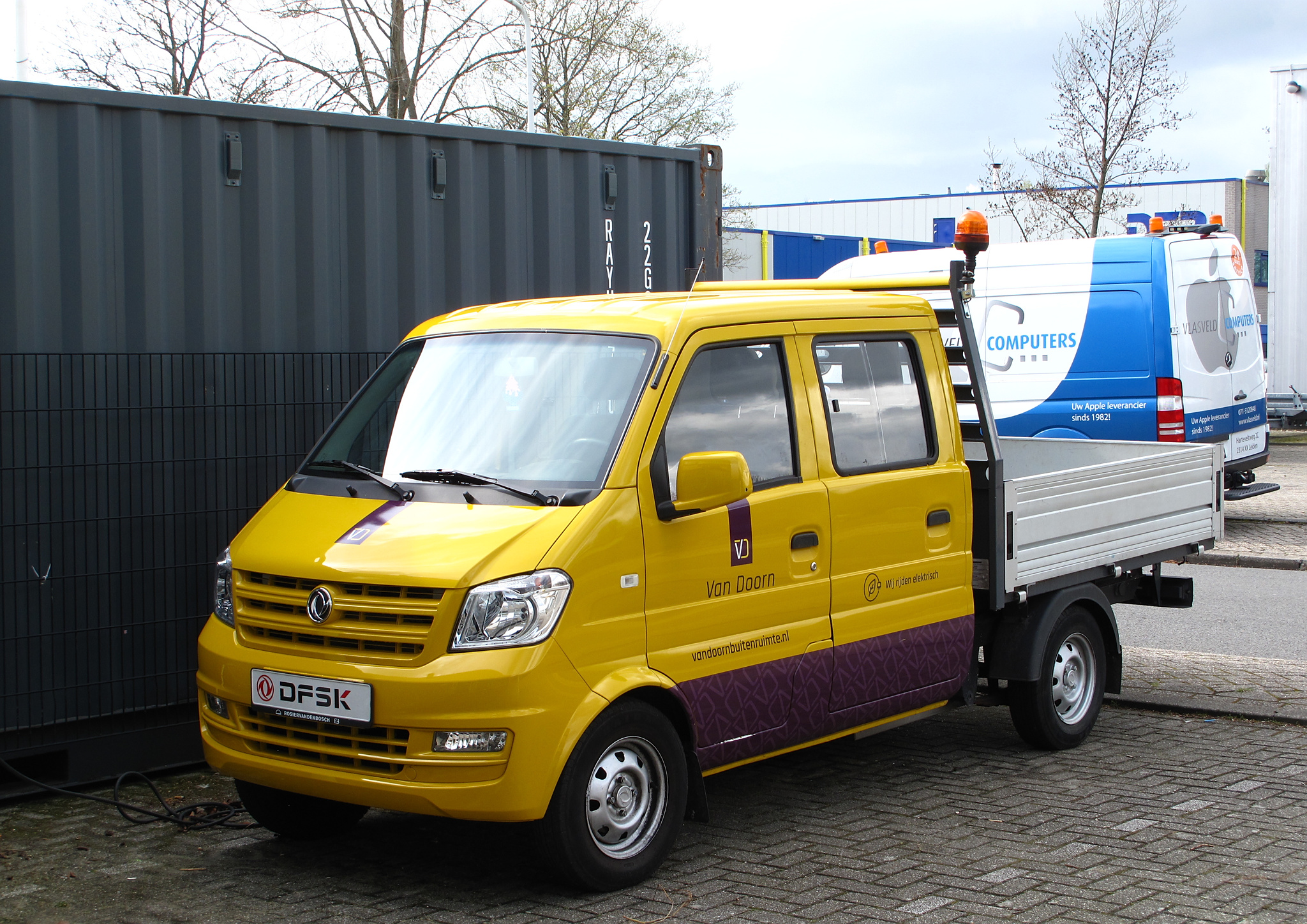
DFSK K02S EV

==== Oversea market variants ====
Restyled K01 models are sometimes sold as the Sokon Fulwin (稳发 in Taiwan) or rebadged as the Giotti Victoria Gladiator in foreign markets.

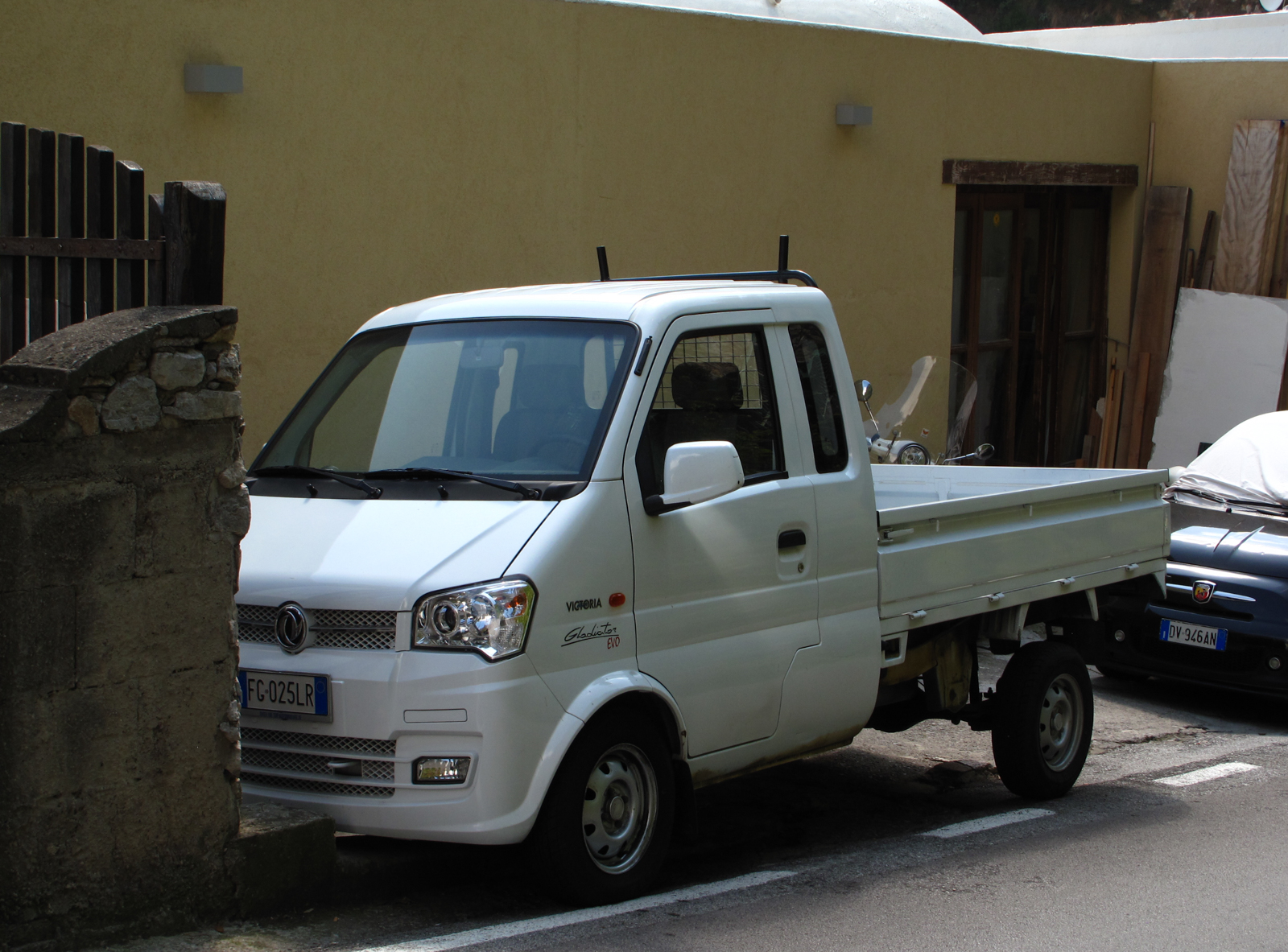
2016 Dongfeng Sokon K01

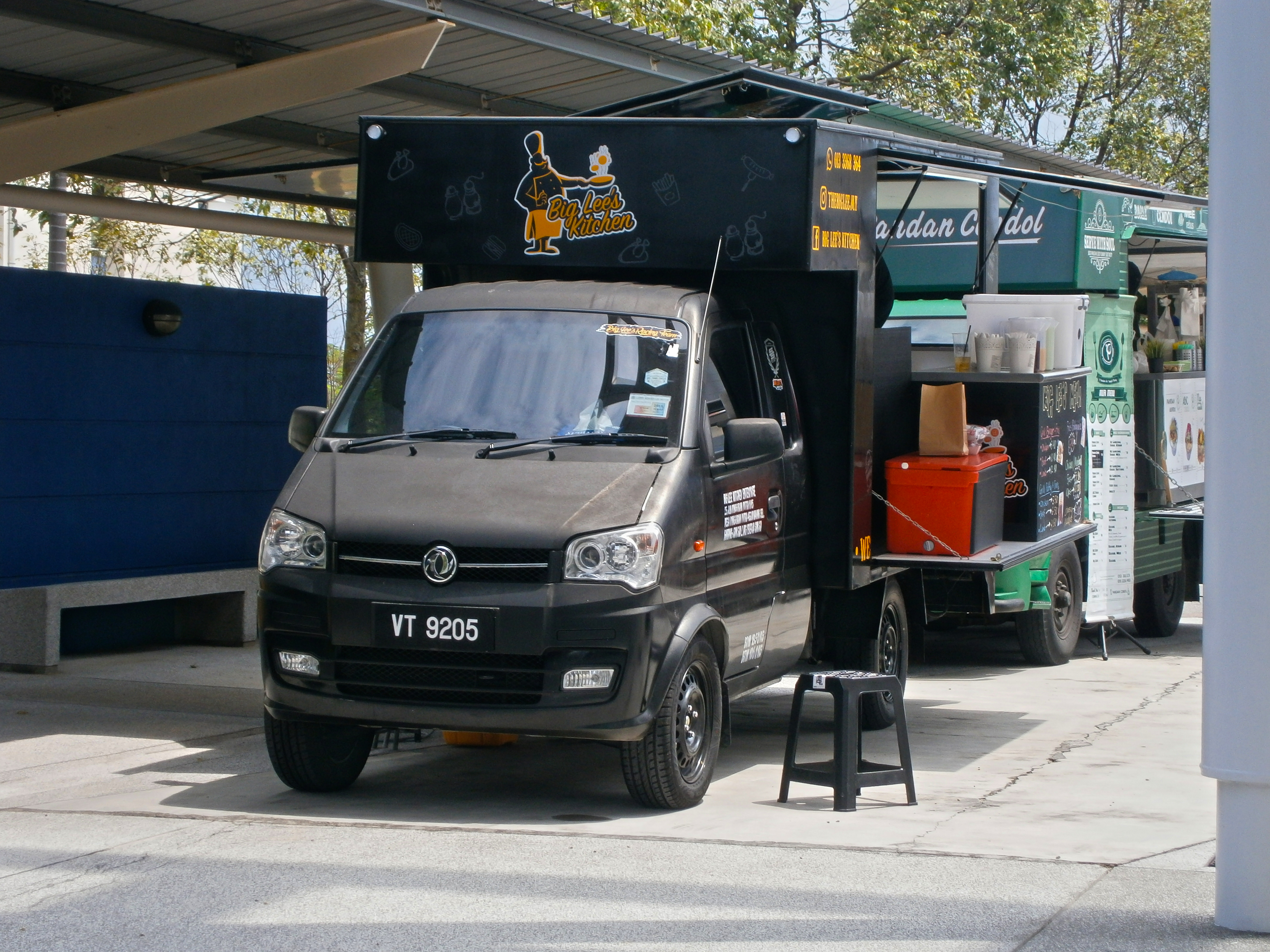
2017 DFSK K01H 1.3 Extra Cabin 2-door pickup truck

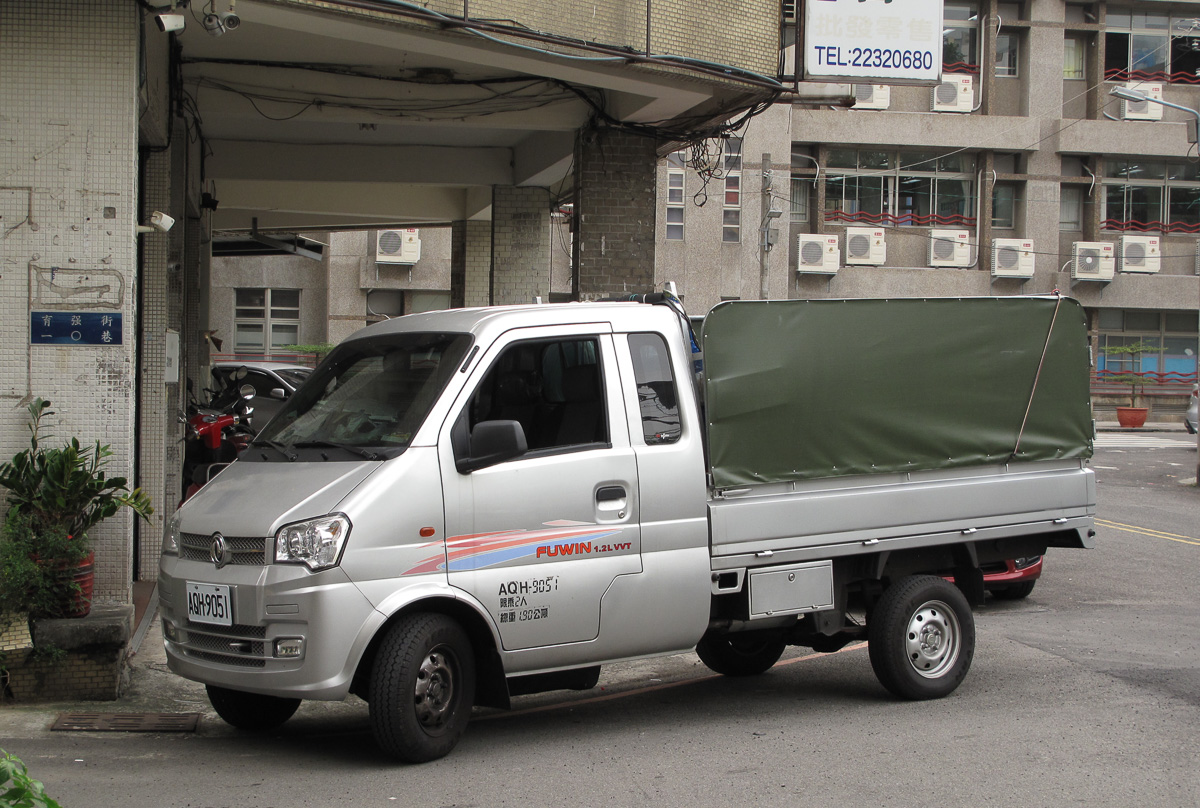
Dongfeng Sokon Fuwin 1.2 in Taiwan

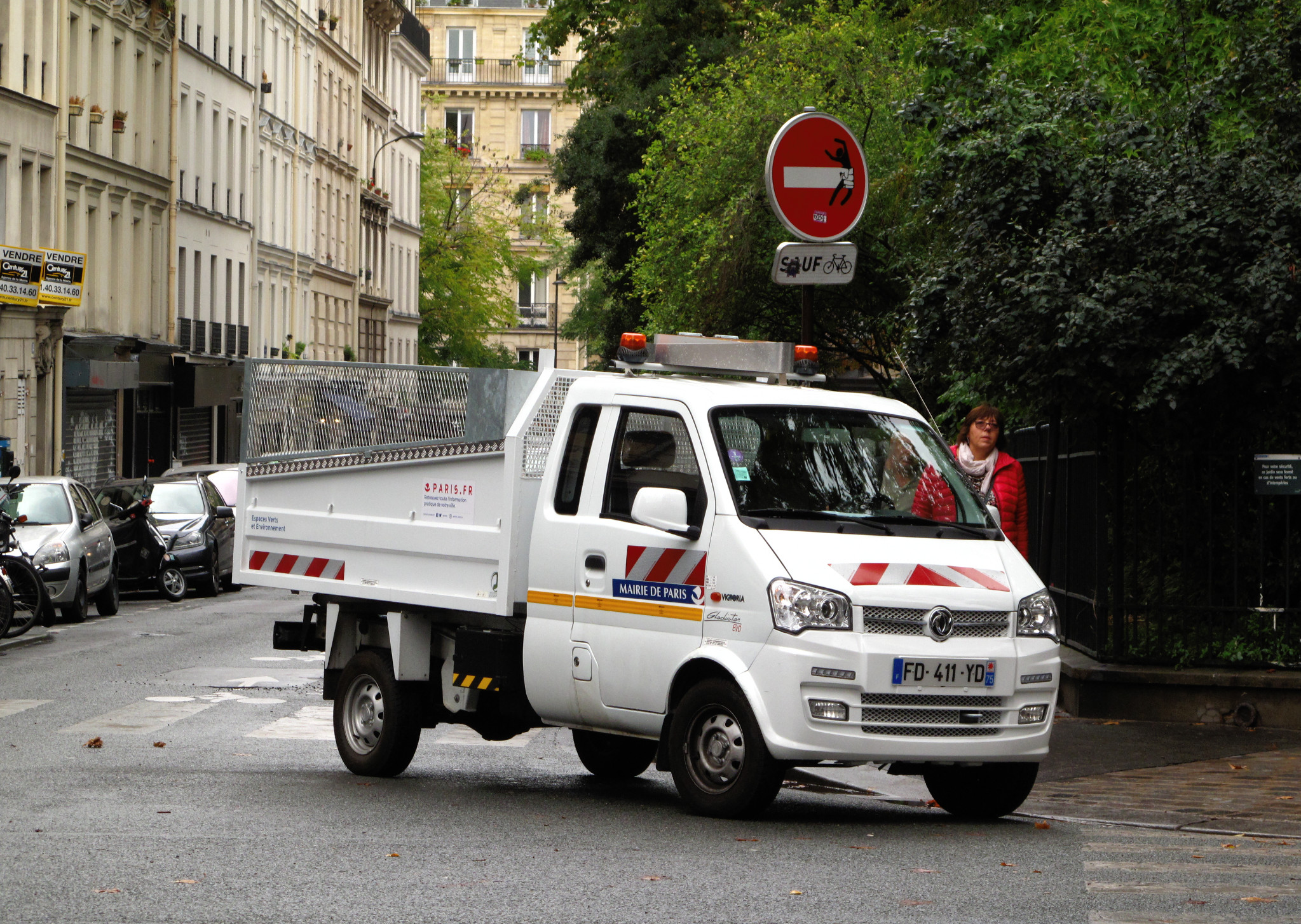
2019 Giotti Victoria Gladiator 1.2 in Paris

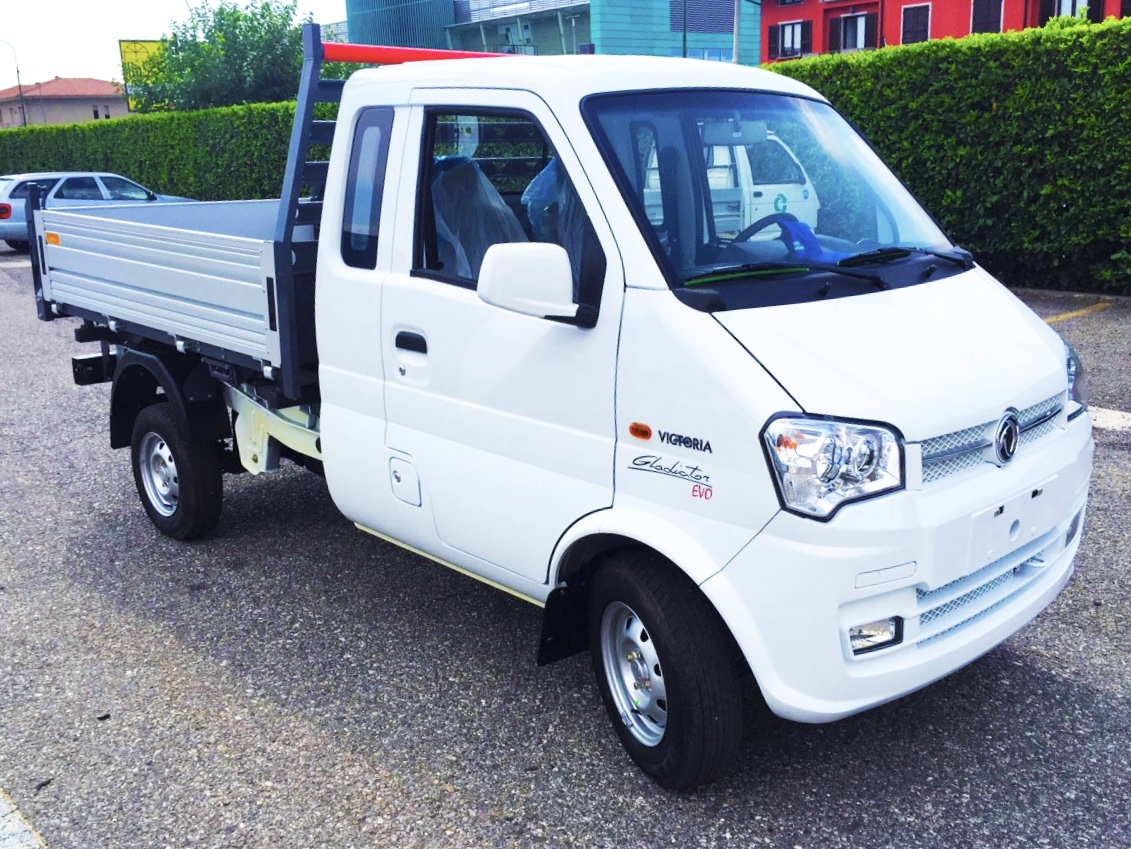
Giotti Victoria Gladiator Evo
