= C32 =

C32 may refer to:

== Vehicles ==
=== Aircraft ===
- Boeing C-32, an American military transport aircraft variant of the Boeing 757
- Caspar C 32, a German agricultural biplane
- Castel C-32, a French glider
- Douglas C-32, an American military transport aircraft

=== Automobiles ===
- Mercedes Benz C32 AMG, a German sedan
- Nissan Laurel C32, a Japanese sedan
- Sauber C32, a Swiss Formula One car

=== Locomotives ===
- GER Class C32, a British steam locomotive class
- New South Wales C32 class locomotive, an Australian steam locomotive

=== Ships ===
- HMS C32, a C-class submarine of the Royal Navy

== Other uses ==
- C-32 highway (Spain), in Catalonia
- C32 road (Namibia)
- Bill C-32, various legislation of the Parliament of Canada
- Caldwell 32, a spiral galaxy
- Caterpillar C32, a diesel engine
- King's Gambit Declined, a chess opening
- Laryngeal cancer
- Socket C32, a server processor socket for AMD CPUs
