= C35 =

C35 or C-35 may refer to:

== Vehicles ==
=== Aircraft ===
- Beechcraft C35 Bonanza, an American civil utility aircraft
- Caspar C 35, a German biplane airliner
- Cessna C-35, an American military transport
- EKW C-35, a 1930s Swiss reconnaissance biplane
- Lockheed C-35 Electra, an American military transport

=== Automobiles ===
- Citroën C35, a French van
- DFSK C35, a Chinese van
- Sauber C35, a Swiss Formula One car
- Nissan Laurel C35, a Japanese sedan

=== Locomotives ===
- New South Wales C35 class locomotive, an Australian steam locomotive

=== Ships ===
- HMS Belfast (C35), a Town-class light cruiser of the Royal Navy
- HMS C35, a C-class submarine of the Royal Navy

== Other uses ==
- C-35 (cipher machine)
- C35 road (Namibia)
- Autovia C-35, a highway in Catalonia, Spain
- Caldwell 35, a supergiant elliptical galaxy
- King's Gambit, a chess opening
- Konica C35 AF, a Japanese film camera
- Piaggio Stella P.VII C.35, an Italian aircraft engine
- Reedsburg Municipal Airport, in Sauk County, Wisconsin
