= C33 =

C33 or C-33 may refer to:

== Vehicles ==
Aircraft

- Beechcraft C33 Debonair, an American civil utility aircraft
- Boeing C-33, a proposed American military transport
- Caspar C 33, a German trainer
- Caudron C.33, a French passenger biplane
- Douglas C-33, an American military transport

Automobiles

- Nissan Laurel C33, a Japanese sedan
- Sauber C33, a Swiss Formula One car

Ships

- HMS C33, a C-class submarine of the Royal Navy

== Other uses ==
- Autopista C-33, a highway in Catalonia, Spain
- C33 road (Namibia)
- Caldwell 33, a supernova remnant
- Head and neck cancer
- King's Gambit Accepted, a chess opening
- C.3.3., the pseudonym used by Oscar Wilde to publish his poem "The Ballad of Reading Gaol"
