= C26 =

C26 or C-26 may refer to:

- C.26, a British World War I Coastal class airship
- C26 road (Namibia)
- Caldwell 26, a spiral galaxy
- Caspar C 26, German sport plane
- Douglas C-26 Dolphin, an American military flying boat
- Fairchild C-26 Metroliner, an American military transport
- HMS C26, C-class submarine of the Royal Navy
