= Caspar C 24 =

1920s German aircraft

C 24
- The Caspar C24 in 1925. Only one was built.

General information
- Type: Sports plane
- National origin: Germany
- Manufacturer: Caspar-Werke
- Designer: Karl Theiss
- Number built: 1

History
- First flight: 1925

The Caspar C 24 was a German two-seat biplane sports aircraft that flew in 1925.

== Design and development ==
The C.24 was a biplane of all-wood construction. One C.24 was built, which received the civil registration D-675. It took part in the 1925 Deutschen Rundflug.

== Specifications ==
Data from

General characteristics

- Crew: 2
- Length: 7.00 m (23 ft 0 in)
- Wingspan: 10.00 m (32 ft 10 in)
- Empty weight: 455 kg (1,003 lb)
- Gross weight: 745 kg (1,642 lb)
- Powerplant: 1 × Daimler D.II inline piston engine, 89 kW (120 hp)
- Propellers: 2-bladed fixed pitch propeller

Performance

- Maximum speed: 160 km/h (99 mph, 86 kn)
- Cruise speed: 145 km/h (90 mph, 78 kn)
- Service ceiling: 4,000 m (13,000 ft)
