= Caspar C 27 =

C 27
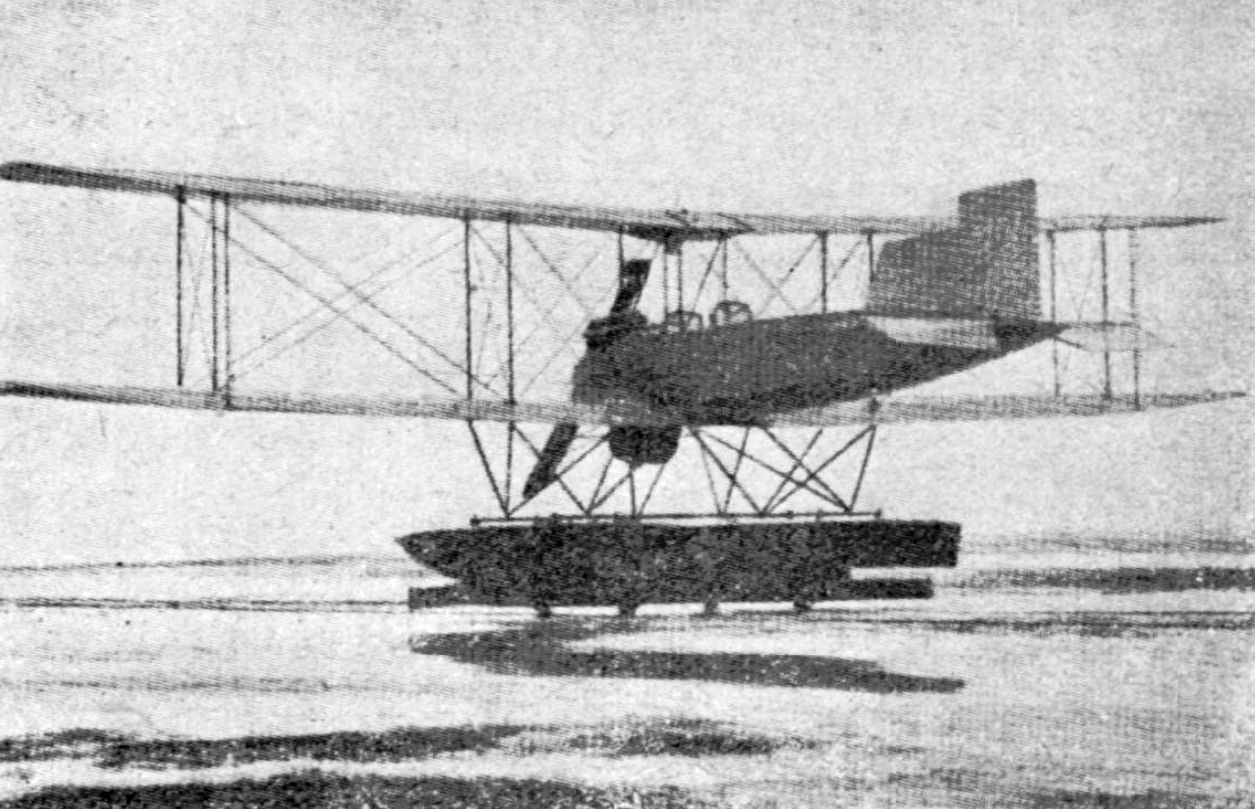

General information
- Type: Trainer seaplane
- Manufacturer: Caspar-Werke
- Number built: 2

History
- First flight: 1926

The Caspar C 27 was a training seaplane developed in Germany in the late 1920s.

== Design and development ==
Two C 27s were built (Werk N. 7001, 7004).

== Specifications ==
Data from

General characteristics

- Crew: 2
- Length: 10.25 m (33 ft 8 in)
- Wingspan: 15.36 m (50 ft 5 in)
- Height: 4.25 m (13 ft 11 in)
- Wing area: 48.60 m^{2} (523.1 sq ft)
- Empty weight: 1,300 kg (2,866 lb)
- Gross weight: 1,800 kg (3,968 lb)
- Powerplant: 1 × BMW IVa inline piston engine, 227 kW (305 hp)
- Propellers: 2-bladed fixed pitch propeller

Performance

- Maximum speed: 175 km/h (109 mph, 94 kn)
- Cruise speed: 150 km/h (93 mph, 81 kn)
- Range: 400 km (250 mi, 220 nmi)
- Service ceiling: 4,000 m (13,000 ft)
