= Caspar-Werke =

German aircraft manufacturer

The Caspar-Werke was a German aircraft manufacturer of the early 20th century. It was founded in 1911 by Karl Caspar under the name Zentrale für Aviatik in Fuhlsbüttel. In its early years, the firm built Etrich and Rumpler types under licence, and was dissolved following World War I.

In 1921, Caspar re-established the firm at Travemünde with Ernst Heinkel as chief designer. Heinkel left in May the following year after a dispute over rights to a design, and was replaced by Ernst Ritter von Lössl. Later, Hans Herrmann from the former Udet Flugzeugbau, was the designer. The company ceased operations in 1928.

== Aircraft ==
- Caspar CC 15 project only
- Caspar CST 18 project only
- Caspar C 24
- Caspar C 26
- Caspar C 27
- Caspar C 30
- Caspar C 32
- Caspar C 33
- Caspar C 35
- Caspar U.1
