= Bill C-32 =

Bill C-32 refers to various legislation introduced into the House of Commons of Canada, including:

- Canadian Environmental Protection Act, 1999, introduced to the first session of the 36th Canadian Parliament
- An Act to amend the Copyright Act (40th Canadian Parliament, 3rd Session), not passed
