= Castel C-32 =

1930s French glider

General information
- Type: Performance glider
- National origin: France
- Manufacturer: Castel
- Number built: 1

History
- First flight: 1936

The Castel C-32 was a performance glider built in the late 1930s in France. It was a glider of high-wing monoplane configuration.

== Specifications ==
Data from

General characteristics

- Crew: One
- Length: 6.20 m (20 ft 4 in)
- Wingspan: 15.02 m (49 ft 3 in)
- Height: 1.80 m (5 ft 11 in)
- Wing area: 15.09 m^{2} (162.4 sq ft)
- Aspect ratio: 20
- Empty weight: 123 kg (271 lb)
- Gross weight: 203 kg (448 lb)

Performance
