= Caspar C 33 =

C 33

General information
- Type: Training aircraft
- Manufacturer: Caspar-Werke
- Designer: Reinhold Mewes
- Number built: 1

History
- First flight: 1928

The Caspar C 33 was a training aircraft developed in Germany in the late 1920s.

== Specifications ==
Data from

General characteristics

- Crew: 2
- Length: 5.30 m (17 ft 5 in)
- Wingspan: 8.00 m (26 ft 3 in)
- Empty weight: 490 kg (1,080 lb)
- Gross weight: 750 kg (1,653 lb)
- Powerplant: 1 × Armstrong-Siddeley Mongoose 5-cylinder air-cooled radial piston engine, 101 kW (135 hp)
- Propellers: 2-bladed fixed pitch propeller

Performance

- Maximum speed: 160 km/h (99 mph, 86 kn)
- Cruise speed: 130 km/h (81 mph, 70 kn)
