= Caspar C 35 =

C 35 Priwall
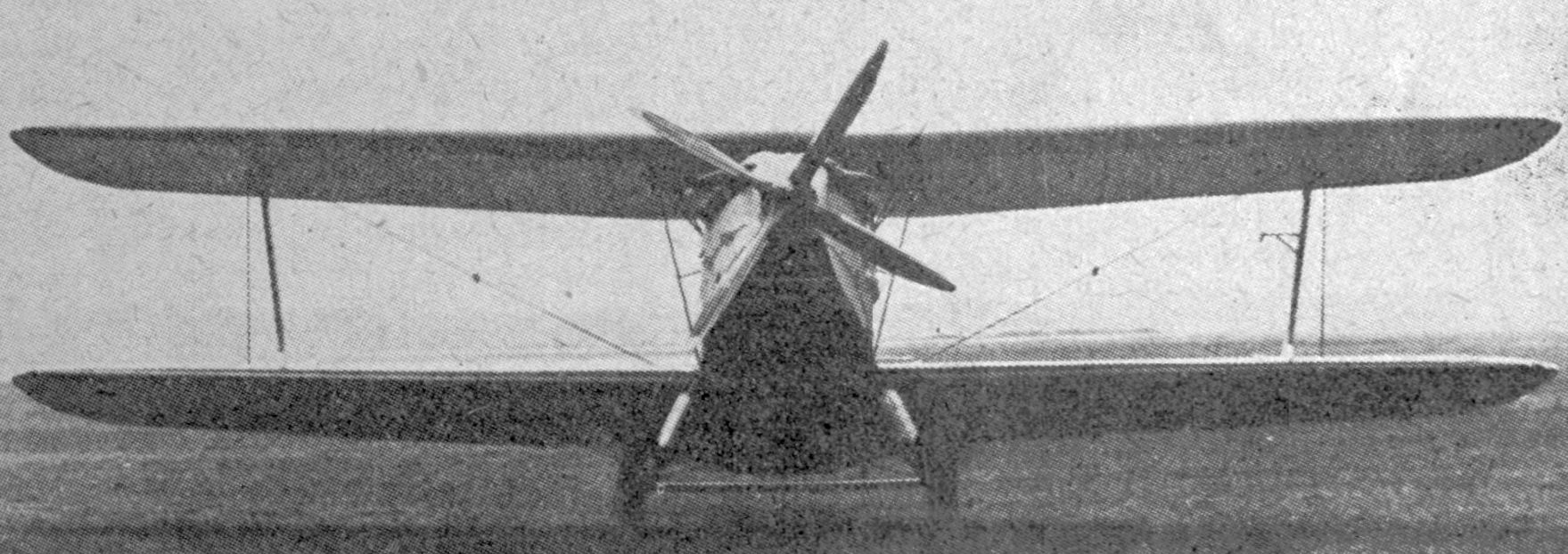

General information
- Type: Airliner
- Manufacturer: Caspar-Werke
- Designer: H Herrmann
- Number built: 1

History
- First flight: 1928

The Caspar C 35 Priwall (for the Priwall Peninsula) was a German airliner of the late 1920s, of which only a single example was built. It was a large, single-engine, single-bay biplane of conventional configuration with fixed tailskid undercarriage. The staggered, equal-span wings were braced with a large I-strut. Not only were the passengers seated within a fully enclosed cabin, but the flight deck was fully enclosed as well.

The sole C 35 was operated by Deutsche Luft Hansa, christened Rostock. It was destroyed in July 1930.

== Specifications ==
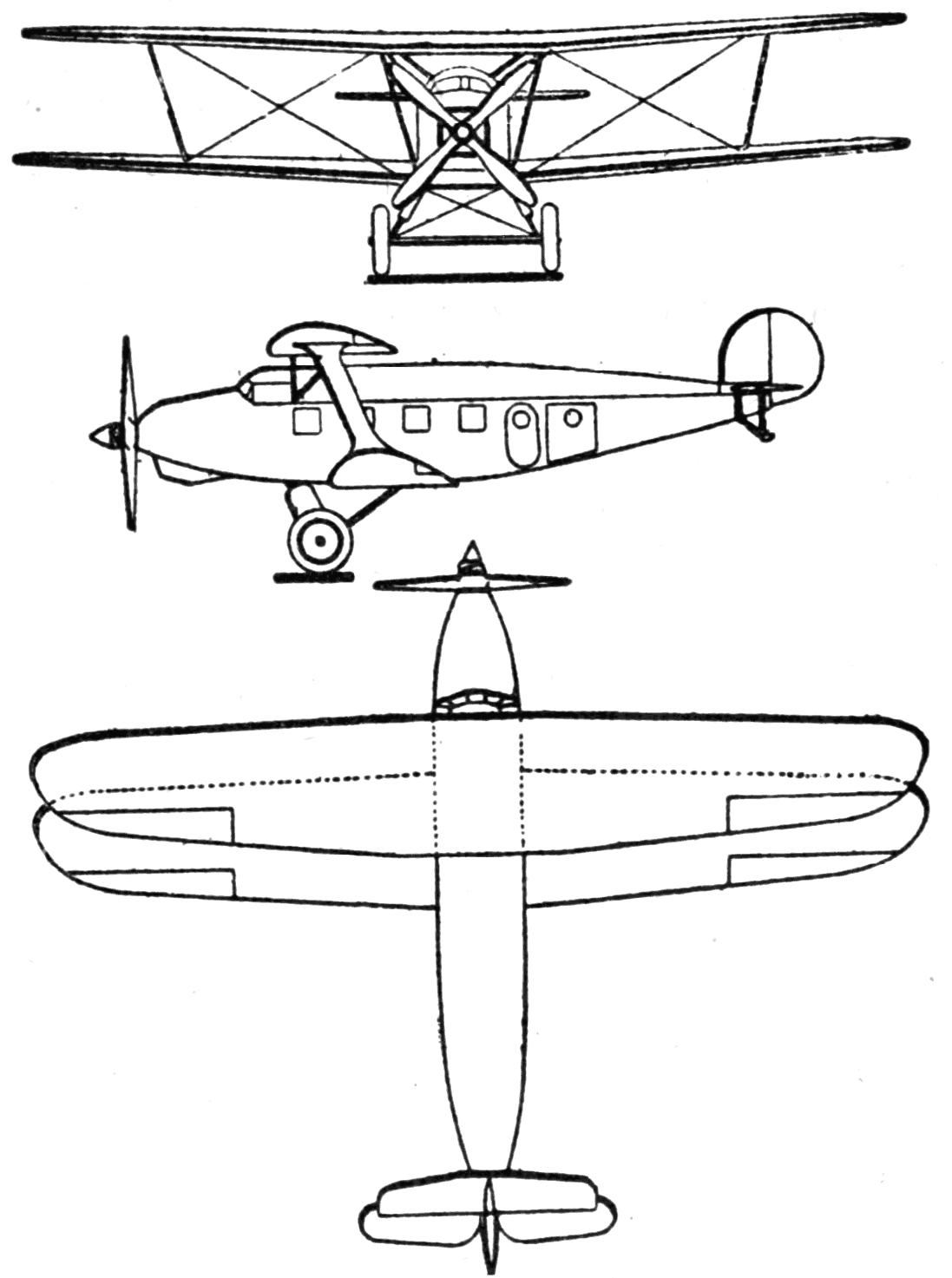
Caspar C 35 3-view drawing from Le Document aéronautique November,1928

Data from Jane's all the World's Aircraft 1928

General characteristics

- Crew: 2
- Capacity: 8 pax
- Length: 13.27 m (43 ft 6 in)
- Wingspan: 17.62 m (57 ft 10 in)
- Height: 5 m (16 ft 5 in)
- Wing area: 69 m^{2} (740 sq ft)
- Empty weight: 2,530 kg (5,578 lb)
- Gross weight: 4,300 kg (9,480 lb)
- Powerplant: 1 × BMW VIU V-12 water-cooled piston engine, 370 kW (500 hp) / 450 kW (600 hp)
- Propellers: 4-bladed fixed pitch wooden propeller

Performance

- Maximum speed: 202 km/h (126 mph, 109 kn)
- Cruise speed: 180 km/h (110 mph, 97 kn)
- Landing speed: 90 km/h (56 mph; 49 kn)
- Range: 1,000 km (620 mi, 540 nmi)
- Service ceiling: 4,000 m (13,000 ft)
- Time to altitude: 1,000 m (3,300 ft) in 5 minutes; 2,000 m (6,600 ft) in 12 minutes
- Wing loading: 62.3 kg/m^{2} (12.8 lb/sq ft)
- Power/mass: 0.0870 kW/kg (0.0529 hp/lb)
