= Caspar C 26 =

1920s German aircraft

C 26

General information
- Type: Sports plane
- Manufacturer: Caspar-Werke
- Designer: Karl Theiss
- Number built: 1

History
- First flight: 1925

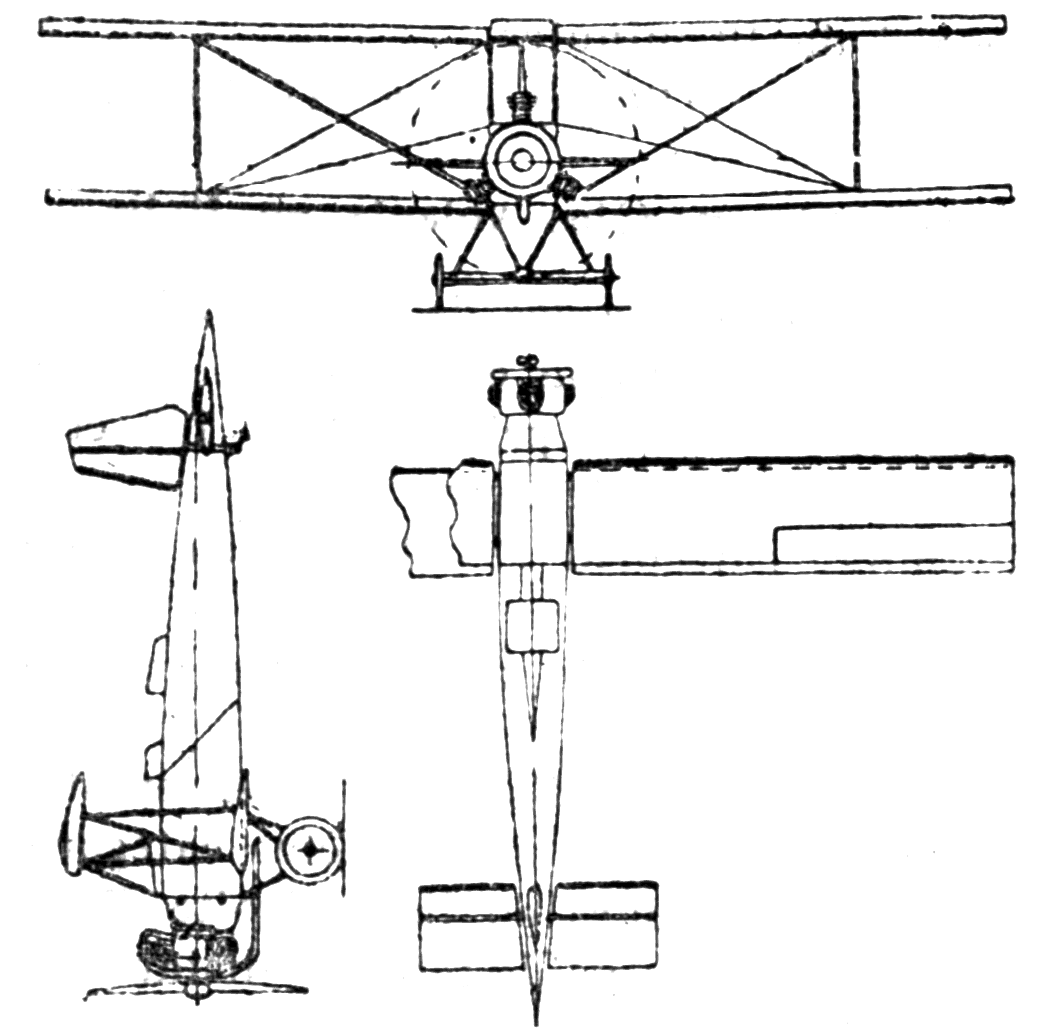

The Caspar C 26 was a sports aircraft developed in Germany in the mid-1920s.

== Design and development ==
The C.26 was a biplane of all-wood construction. One copy of the C.26 was built, receiving the civil registration D-674. It took part in the 1925 Deutschen Rundflug.

== Specifications ==
Data from

General characteristics

- Crew: 2
- Length: 7.20 m (23 ft 7 in)
- Wingspan: 12.40 m (40 ft 8 in)
- Empty weight: 576 kg (1,270 lb)
- Gross weight: 825 kg (1,819 lb)
- Powerplant: 1 × Bristol Lucifer inline piston engine, 75 kW (100 hp)
- Propellers: 2-bladed fixed pitch propeller

Performance

- Maximum speed: 150 km/h (93 mph, 81 kn)
- Cruise speed: 125 km/h (78 mph, 67 kn)
- Service ceiling: 3,800 m (12,500 ft)
