= DFSK C-Series =

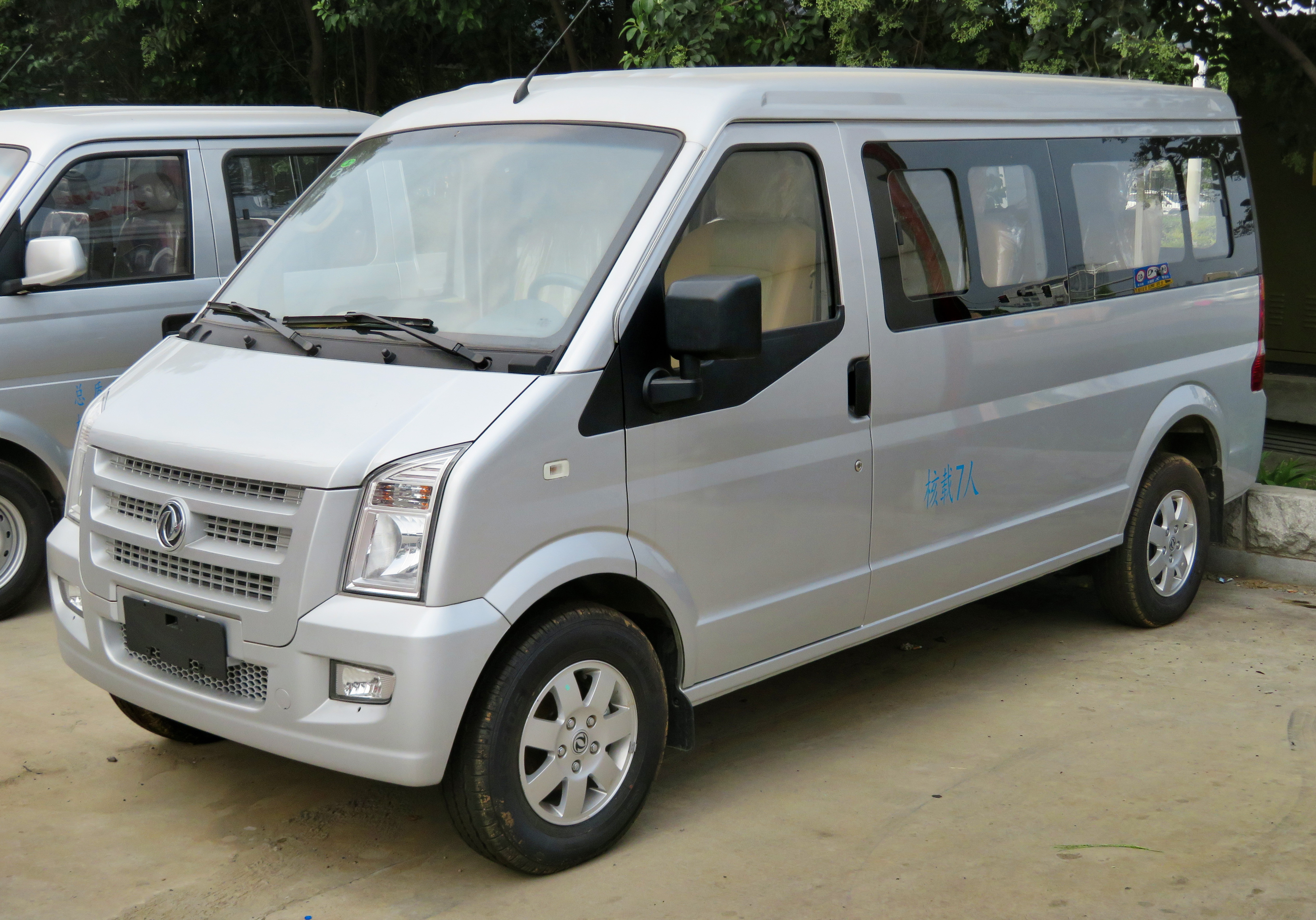
- Dongfeng Sokon C37

Overview
- Manufacturer: DFSK Motor
- Also called: DFSK C31; DFSK C32; DFSK C35; DFSK C36; DFSK C37; DFSK C51; DFSK C52; DFSK EC31; DFSK EC35; DFSK EcoCity 35; DFSK EC36; DFSK Super Cab (Indonesia, truck only); DFSK Gelora (Indonesia, van only); DFSK Super Fuwin (Taiwan, truck only); DFSK KingCab (Taiwan, truck only); Dongfeng Ruitaite EM16; Golden Dragon Longyun (龙运) GLE570; CAM EC35 (Malaysia, van only); Sokon EC31 (Thailand, Pickup); Sokon EC35 (Thailand, Van)
- Production: 2009–present
- Assembly: China (DFSK); Taiwan (FAC); Indonesia: Serang, Banten (Sokonindo Automobile)

Body and chassis
- Class: Light commercial vehicle
- Body style: 2-door pickup; 4-door pickup; 4/5-door van
- Layout: front-mid-engine, rear-wheel drive (ICE); Rear-motor, rear-wheel-drive (Electric)

Powertrain
- Engine: 1.2 L DK13 I4 (petrol); 1.2 L DK12-05 I4 (petrol); 1.2 L SFD12B I4 (diesel); 1.4 L DK13-06 I4 (petrol); 1.5 L DK15-06 I4 (petrol)
- Electric motor: 60 kW (80 hp) 200 N⋅m (150 lb⋅ft) synchronous motor
- Transmission: 5-speed manual
- Battery: 42 kWh lithium-ion battery

Dimensions
- Wheelbase: 3,050 mm (120.1 in)
- Length: 4,500 mm (177.2 in) (C35, C36, C37); 4,730 mm (186.2 in) (C31); 4,940 mm (194.5 in) (C32); 4,965 mm (195.5 in) (C51, C52)
- Width: 1,655 mm (65.2 in) (C32); 1,680 mm (66.1 in) (C35, C36, C37); 1,720 mm (67.7 in) (C51, C52); 1,755 mm (69.1 in) (C31)
- Height: 1,910 mm (75.2 in) (C32); 1,960 mm (77.2 in) (C31, C35, C36, C37, C51, C52)

The DFSK C-Series is a series of light commercial vehicles (van and pickup trucks) manufactured by the Chinese automaker DFSK Motor, a joint venture between Dongfeng Motor and Sokon Industry. The vans were first unveiled on September 21, 2009, and the pickup trucks were launched later. The van is available in three models, the C35 (cargo van), the C36 (entry-level passenger van), and the C37 (passenger van). The pickup is available in four models, the C31 and C51 single-cab models, and the C32 and C52 double cab-models.

== Overview ==
The C-Series models are larger and roomier, and have a longer wheelbase than the K-Series and V-Series models. Prices ranges from RMB 46,900 to 59,800 yuan. The design of the C35, C36, and C37 vans are more controversial than the pickup trucks, as the front fascia and the side window graphics heavily resemble the face-lifted third generation Ford Transit.

=== Van model variants ===
The C35 is a cargo van, launched in the second half of 2012. It has steel-sealed windows on the side and the tailgate. It is available in two variants, a traditional panel van with two seats, and a crew van with five seats.

The C36 is the lower-priced entry-level passenger van. It does not have some features, including front fog lights, air conditioning, and airbags, and has steel instead of alloy wheels. The C36 is available as either a 5-seater or a 7-seater.

The C37 is the mid-level passenger van, which includes the features listed as not present on the C36. It is available with 5, 7, 9, or 11 seats, depending on the market.

The C56 is the facelift variant sold from 2022. It has a completely redesigned front end with horizontal headlamps and grilles.

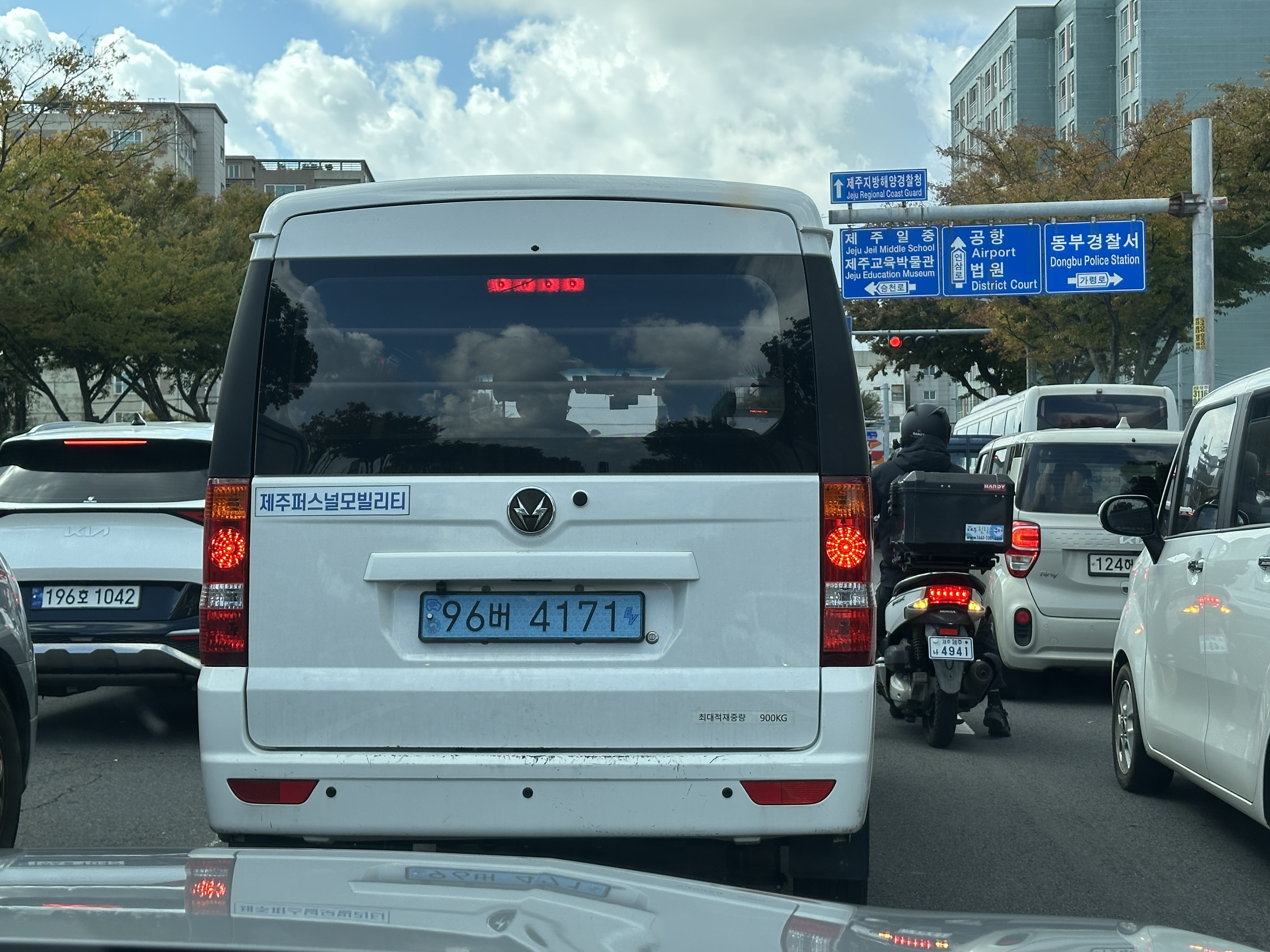
Dongfeng Sokon C35 EV in Jeju, South Korea

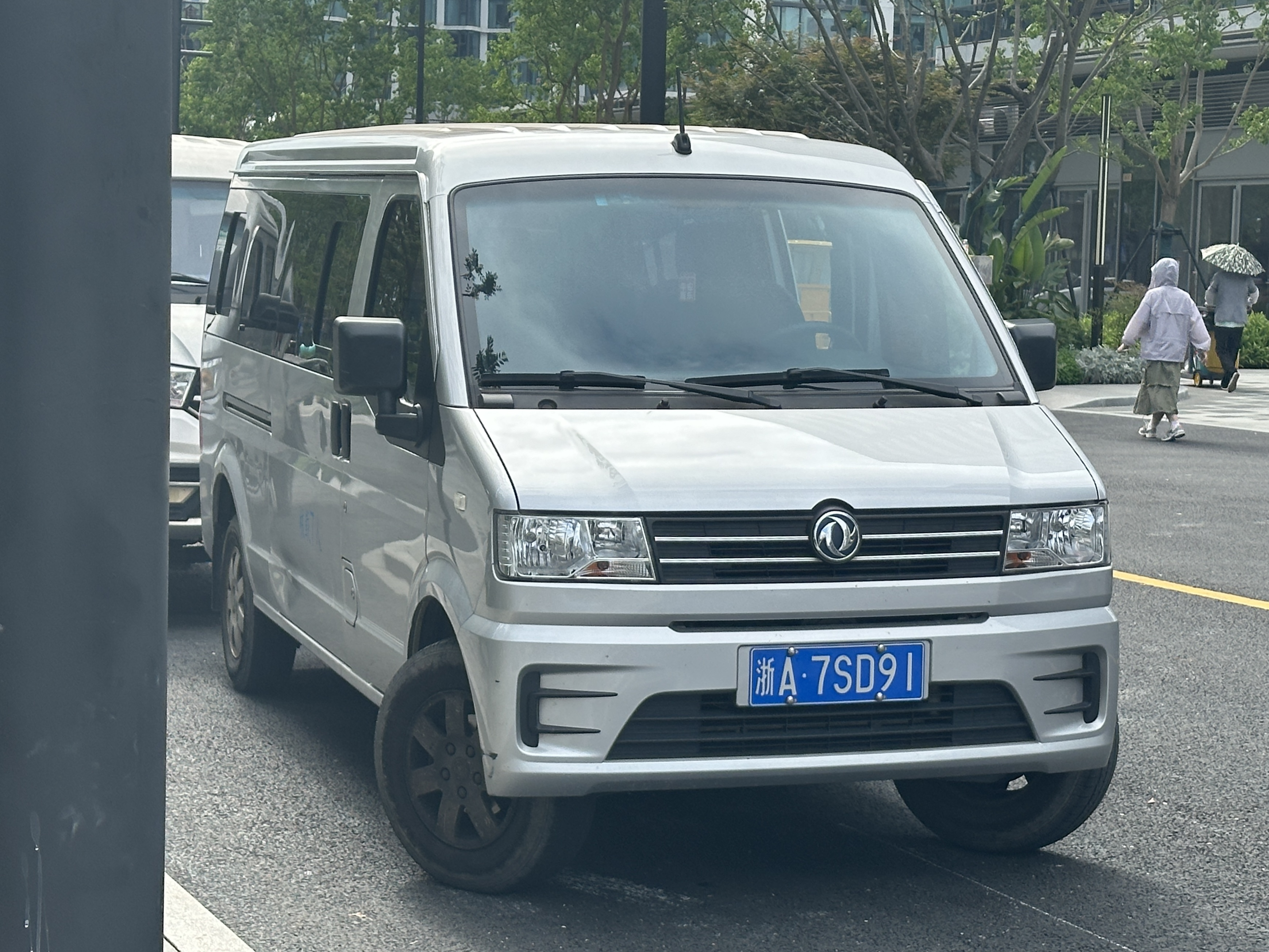
DFSK C56

=== Pickup model variants ===
The pickup models have a completely different cab design although sold as the C-Series range. Headlamps and grilles are shared with the DFSK K-Series microvans. The single cab model was sold in Taiwan as the Sokon Gold Fulwin (金稳发), while the crew cab model was sold as the Grand Fulwin (大稳发) in Taiwan.

The C31 is the single-cab pickup truck, which seats up to two passengers.

The C32 is the double-cab pickup truck with four doors, seating up to five passengers.

The C51 and C52 are essentially enlarged versions of the C31 and C32 with more cabin and cargo space.

The D-series heavy-duty variant is based on the C-series pickup. Variants include the D51 and D52.

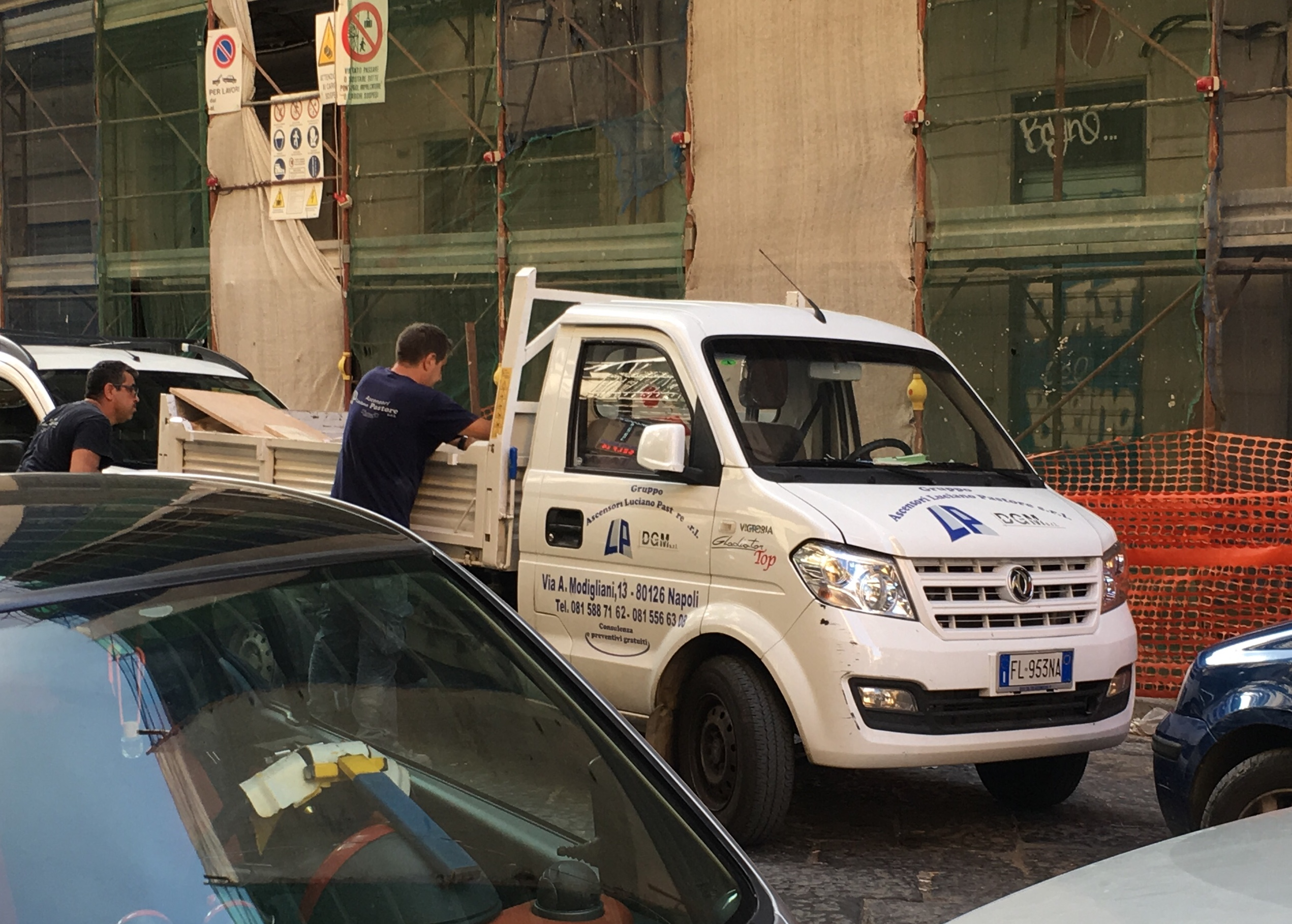
Sokon C31 in Naples

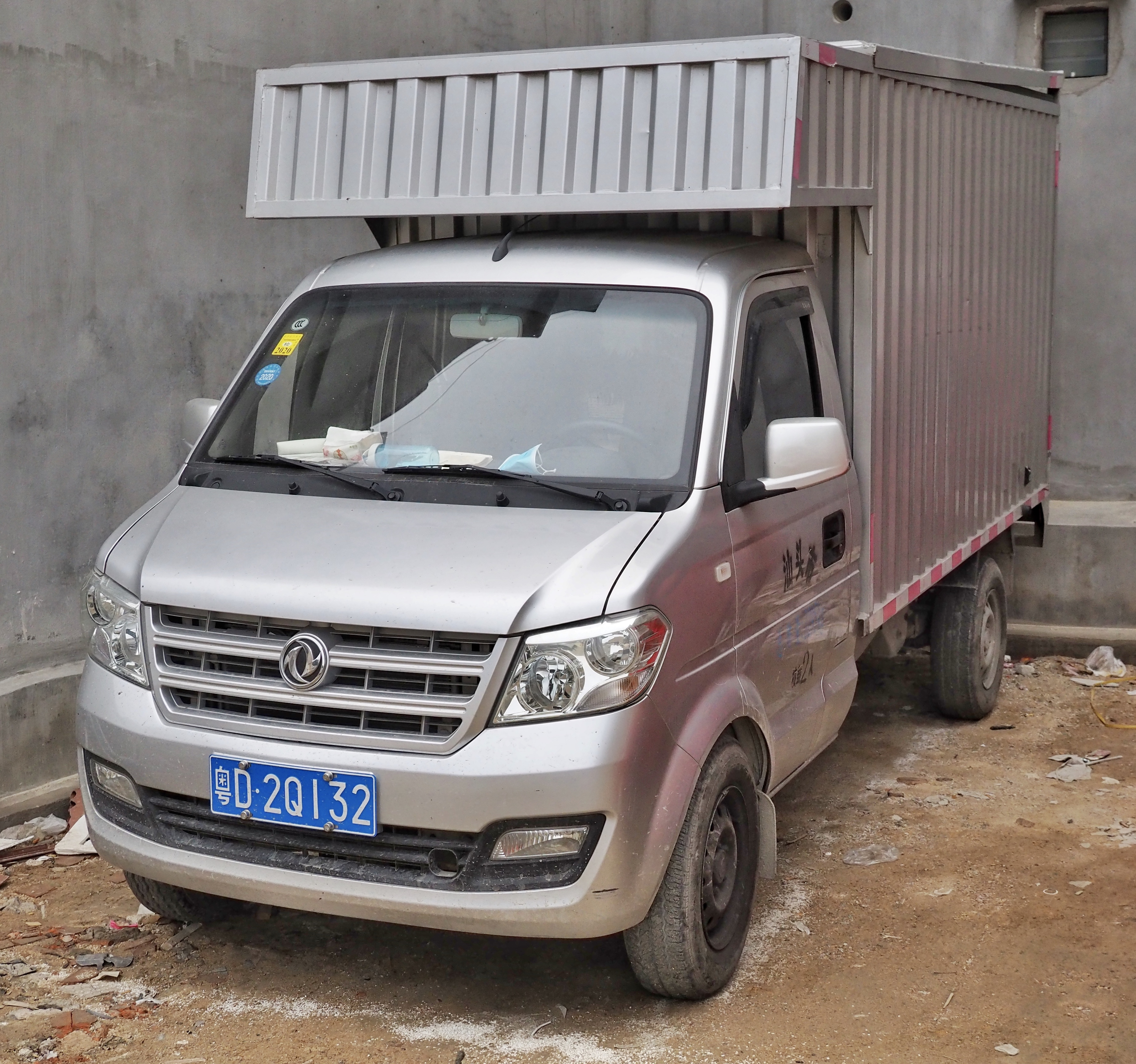
Sokon C31 chassis truck

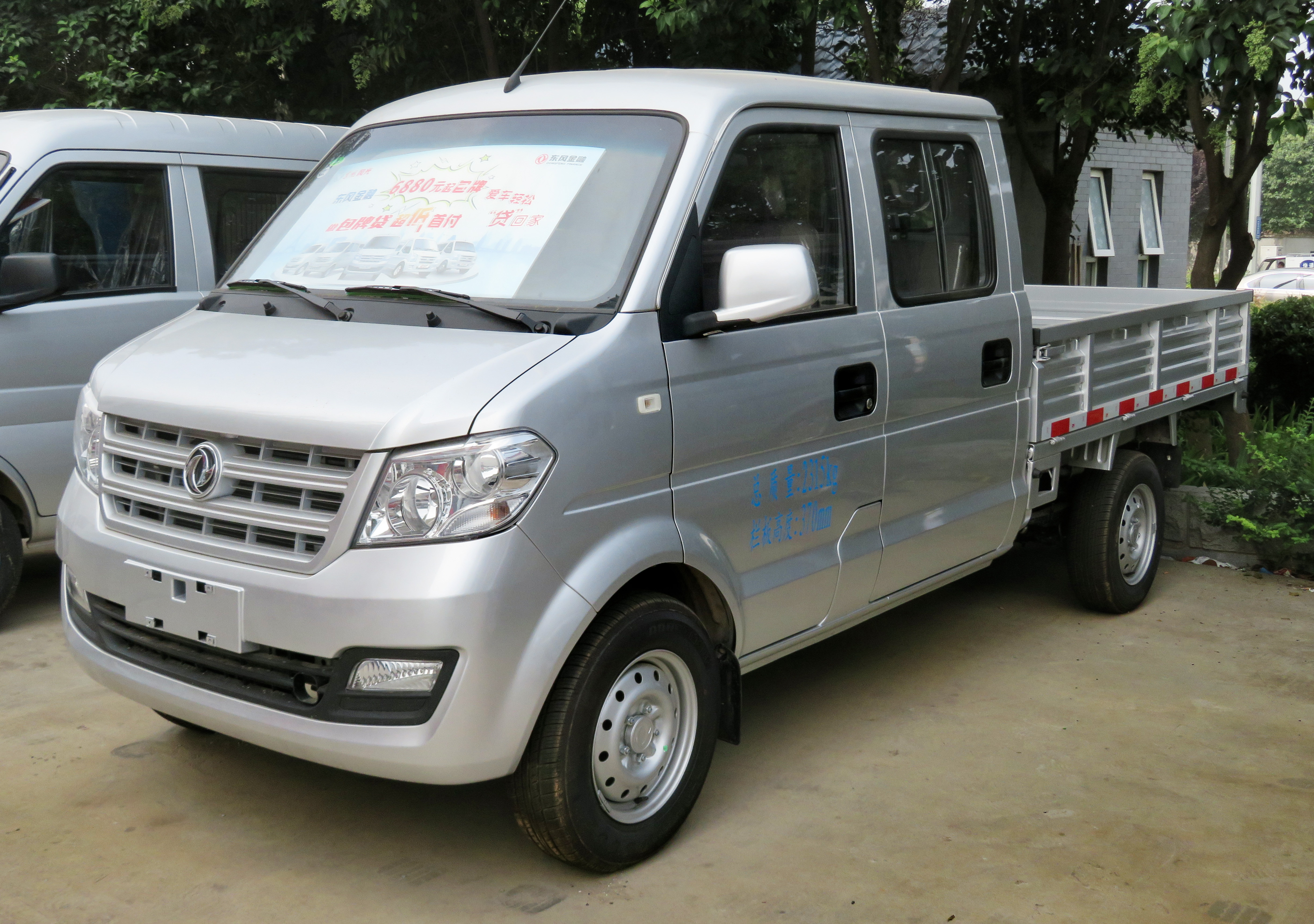
Sokon C32

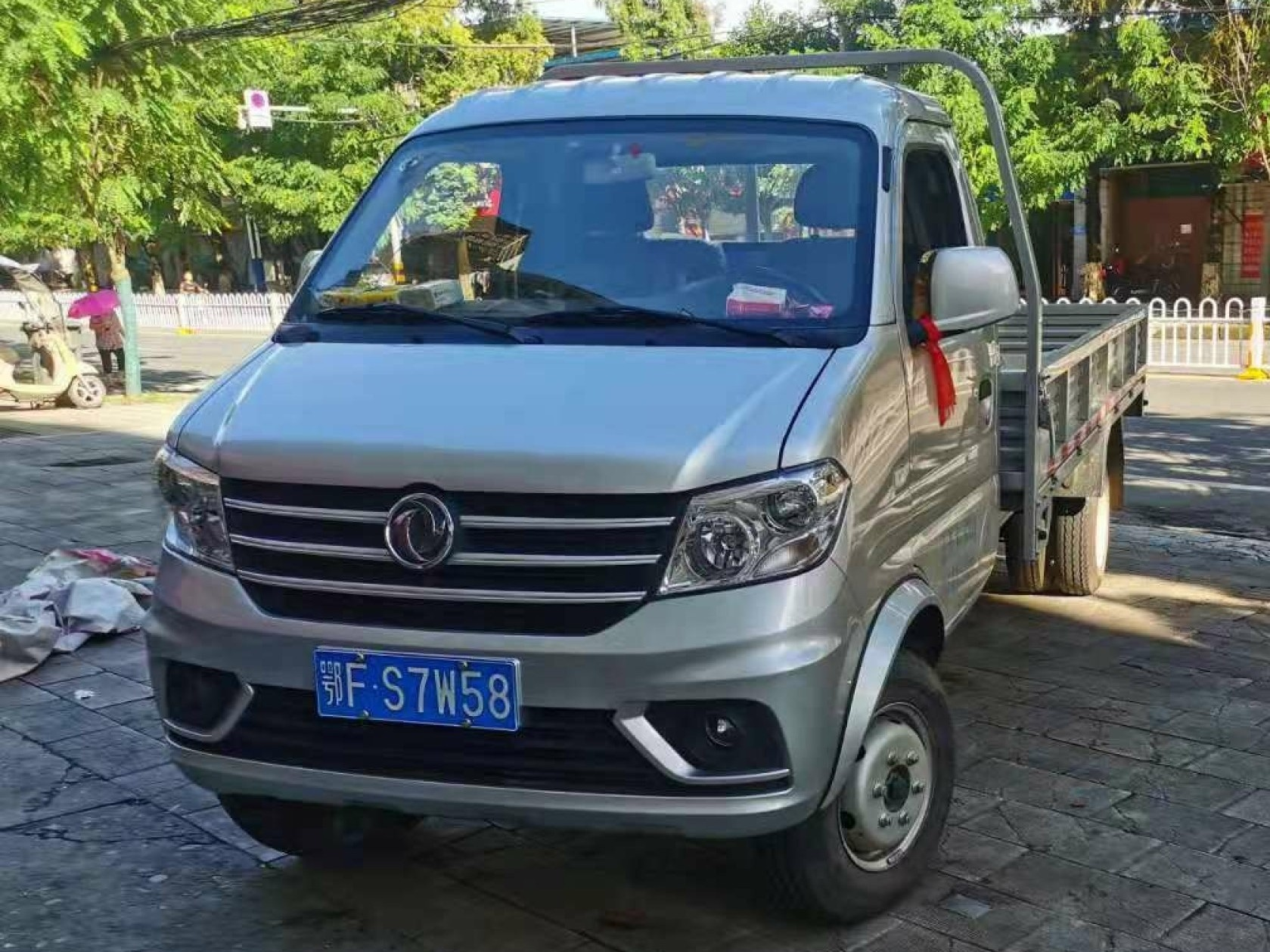
Sokon D51

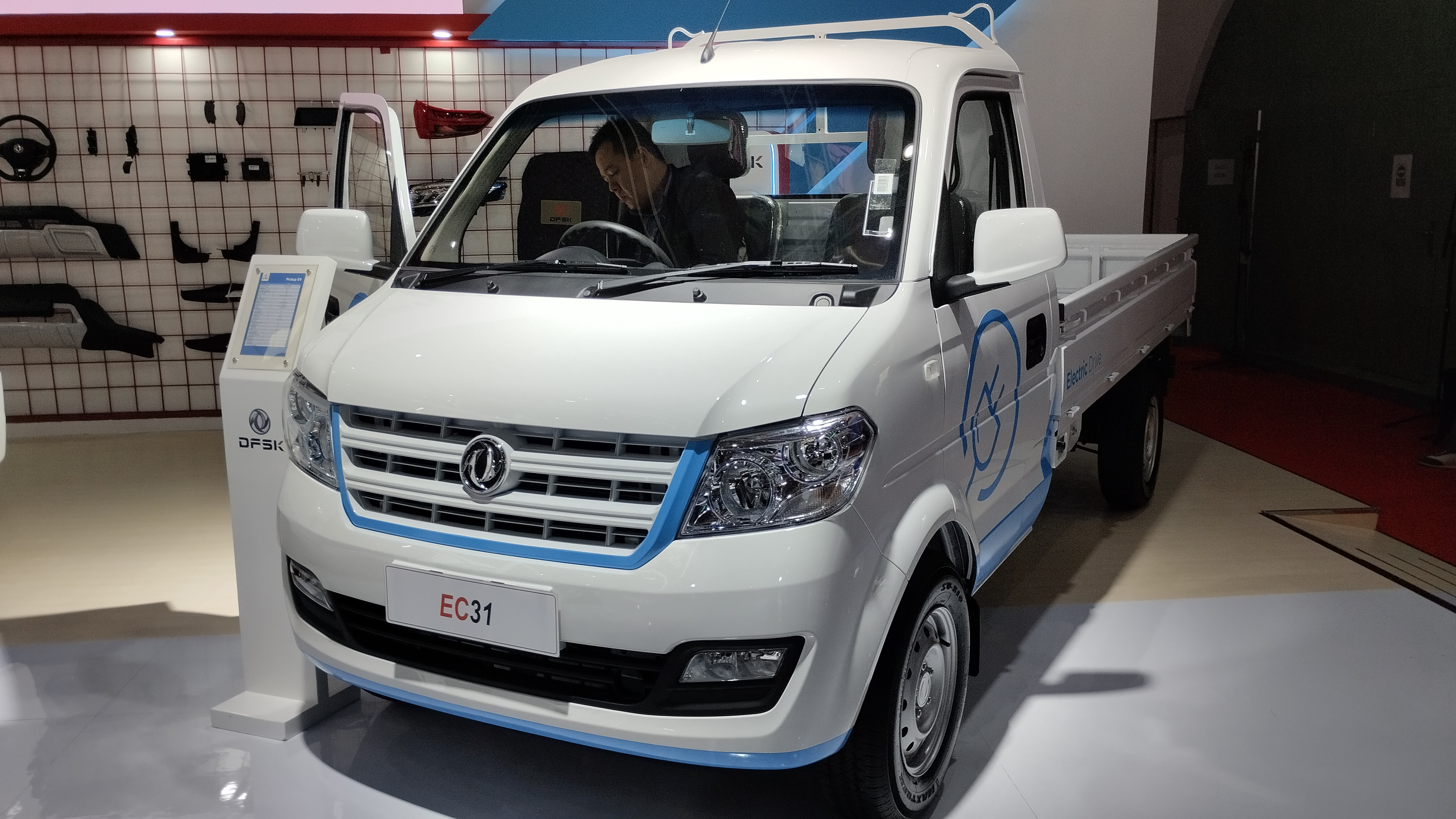
DFSK EC31 (Electric version of DFSK C31)

Slightly upmarket and larger C71 and C72 pickup variants were introduced in 2022 with restyled cab designs. The D-series heavy-duty variants are named D71 and D72.

The C71 is the single-cab pickup truck, which seats up to two passengers. The C72 is the double-cab pickup truck with four doors, seating up to five passengers.

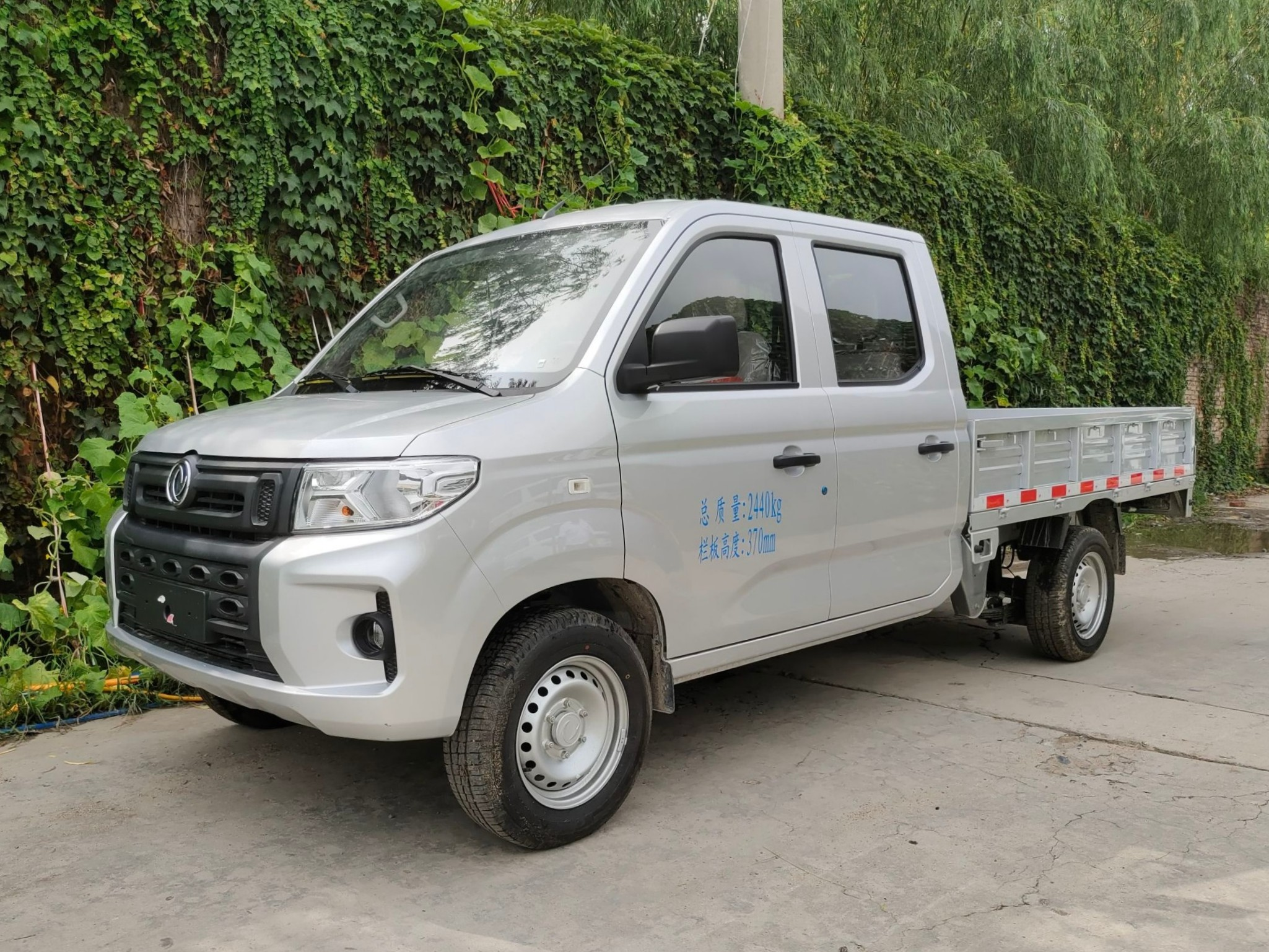
Sokon C72 double-cab pickup truck

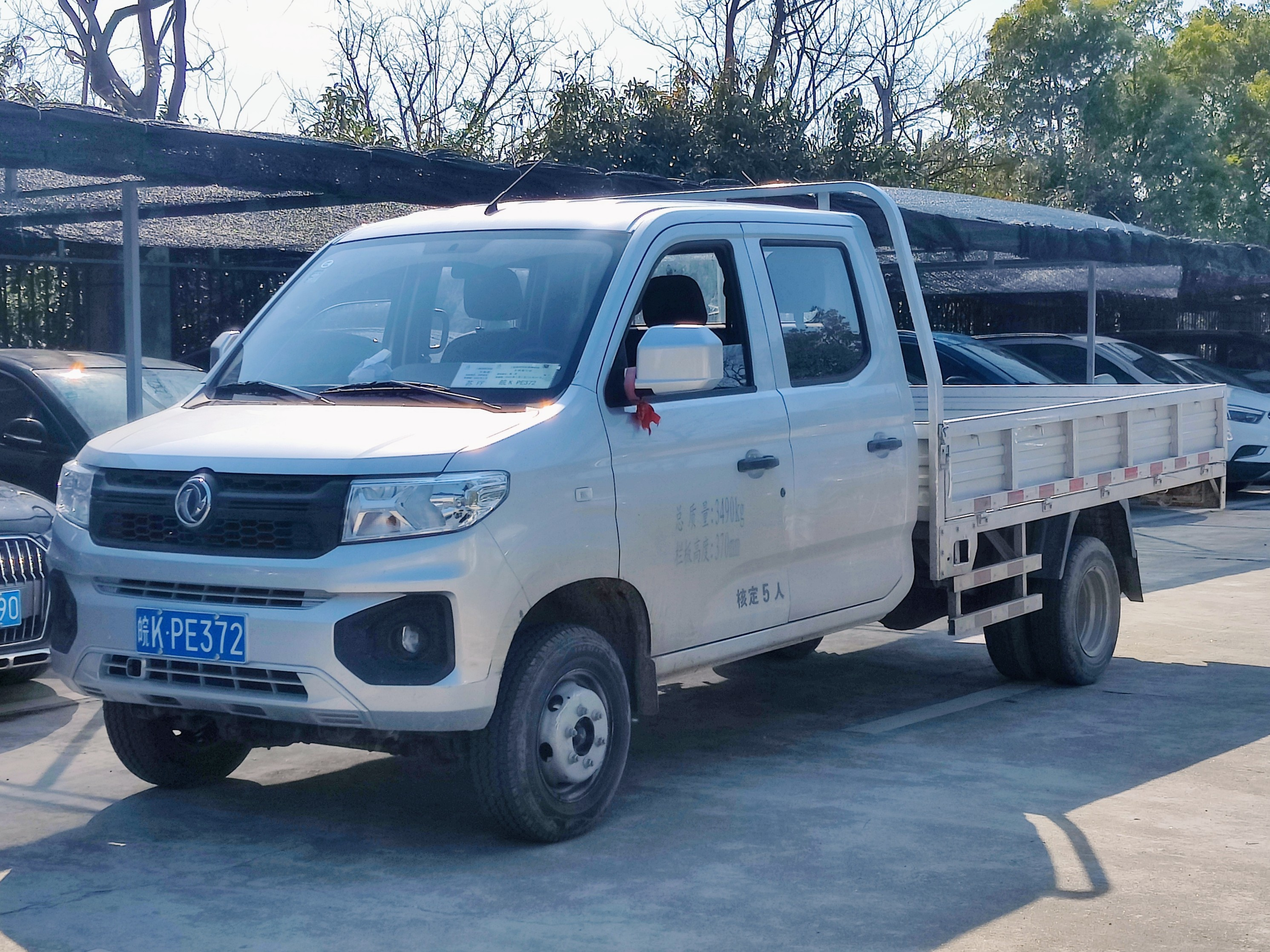
Sokon D72 Plus double-cab dually pickup truck

=== Ruichi electric vans ===
The electric versions of the C31, C35, and C36, known respectively as the EC31, EC35, and EC36, were unveiled in 2018 and sometimes sold under the Ruichi (瑞驰）brand. The EC35 is equipped with a 41.4 kWh battery delivering a range of 233 km (146 miles) according to NEDC testing. The battery pack of the Ruichi EC35 electric van weighs 400 kg (882 lbs) and has a system voltage of 320 V. The EC31, EC35, and EC36 use a 42 kWh battery pack powering a single electric motor driving the rear wheels via a single-speed transmission, which produces 60 kilowatts (80 hp) and 200 newton-metres (150 lb⋅ft) of torque.

A review of the EC35 found that it was priced lower than comparable vehicles, but not up to the standard of modern vans, not particularly fast though suitable for city driving, and liable to struggle with hills, even when not loaded. The interior was considered a little poor for the price.

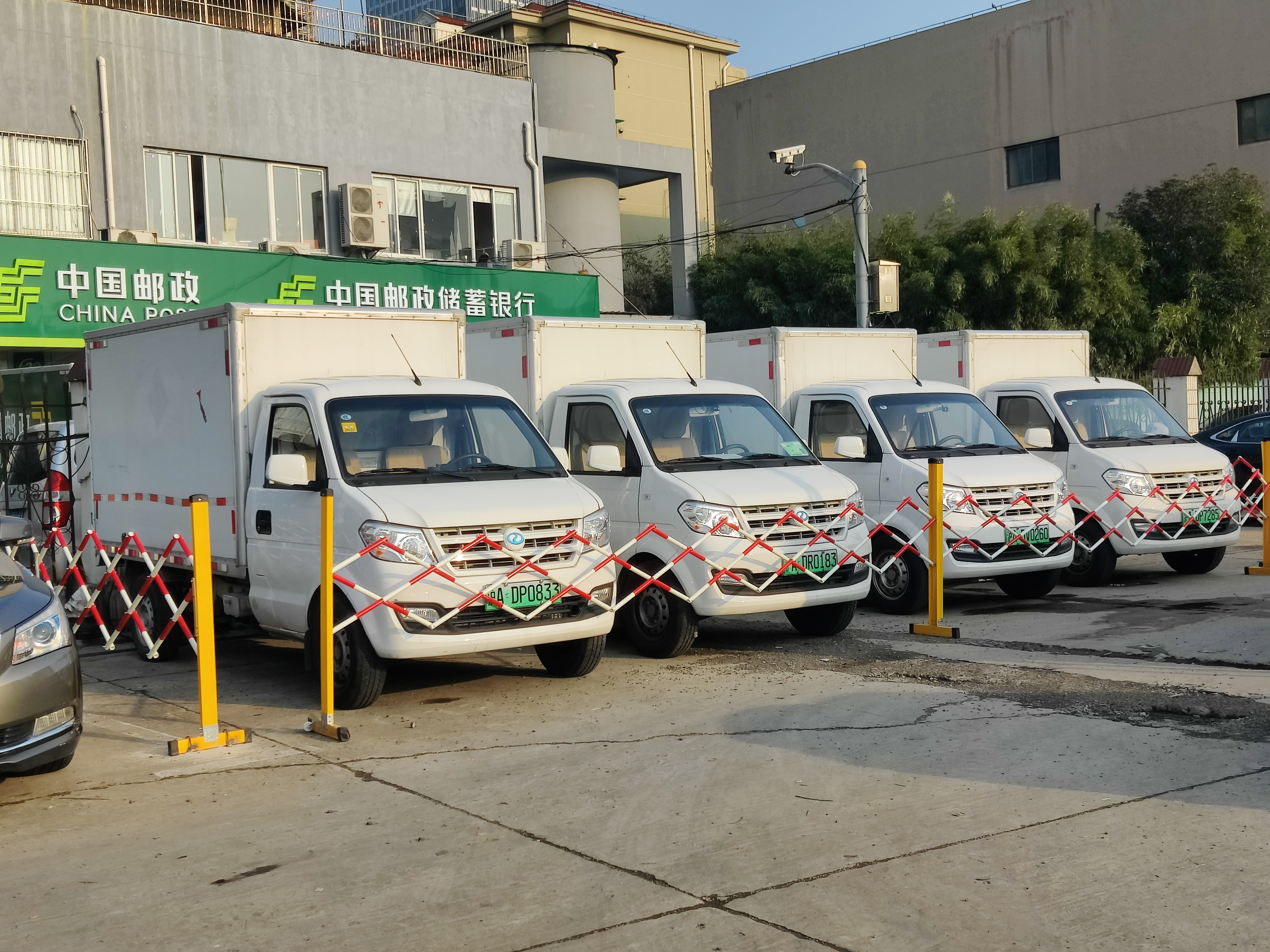
Ruichi EC31 fleet

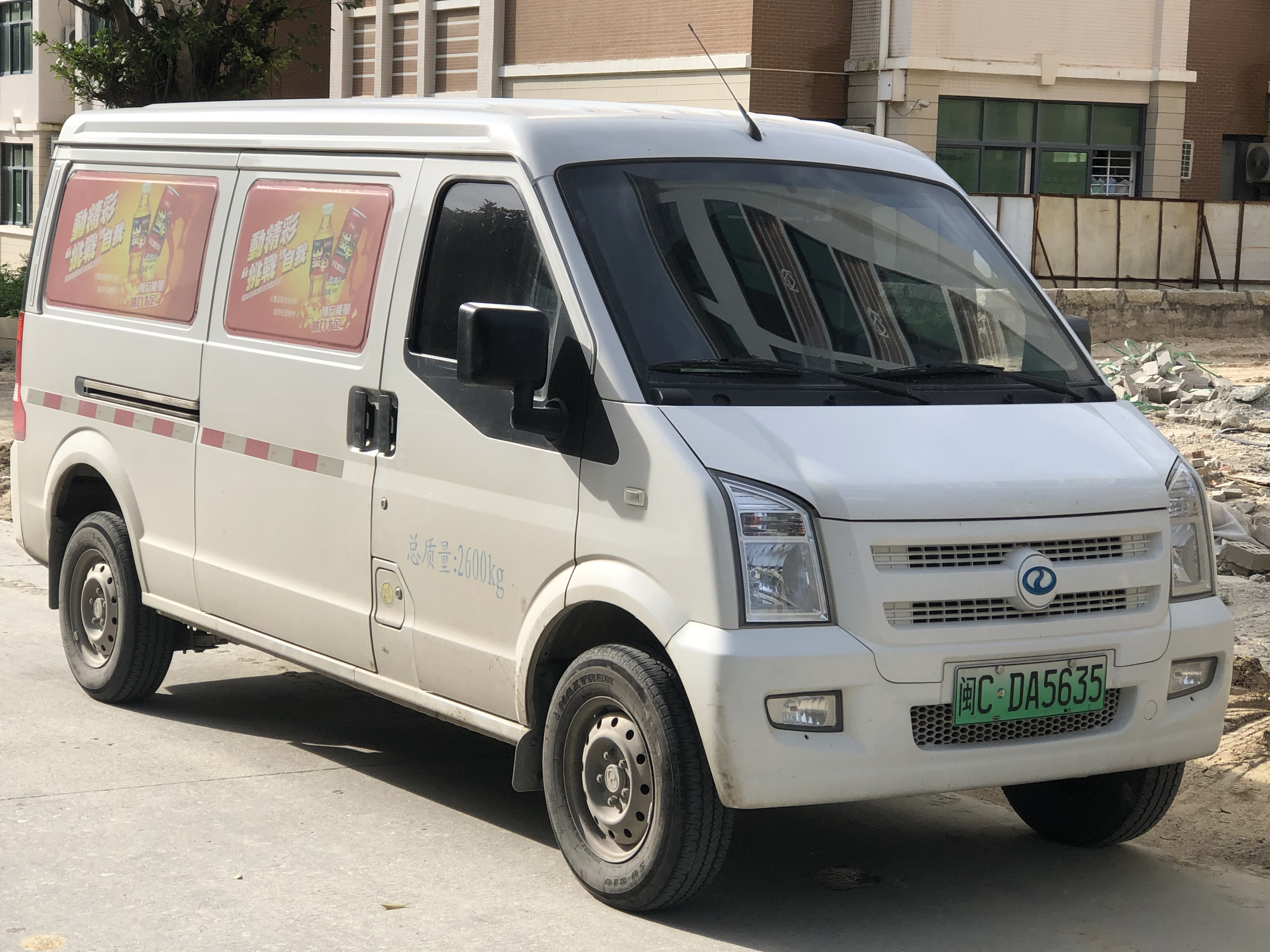
Ruichi EC35

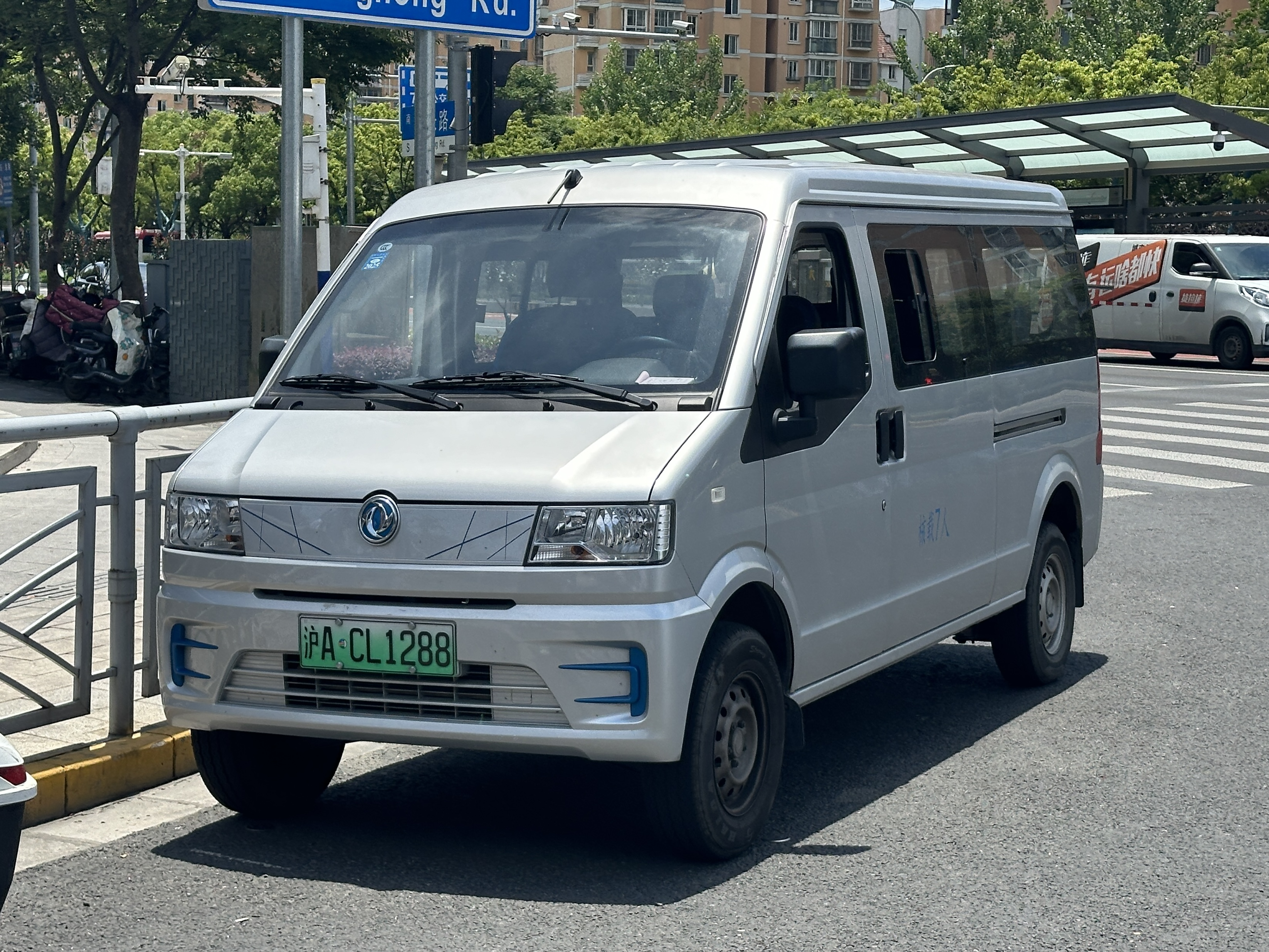
DFSK EC36II/ Ruichi ES50

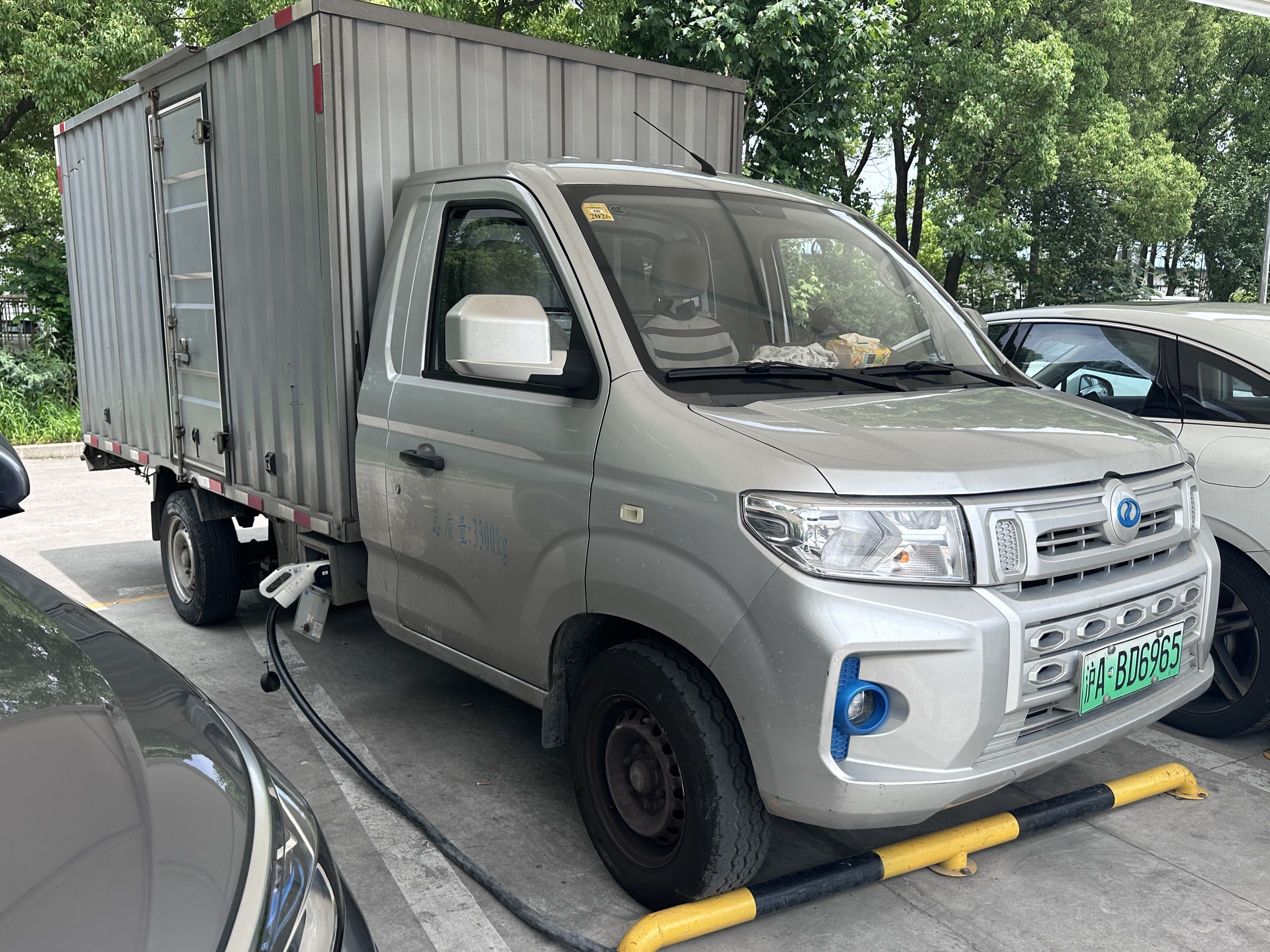
Ruichi EC71L

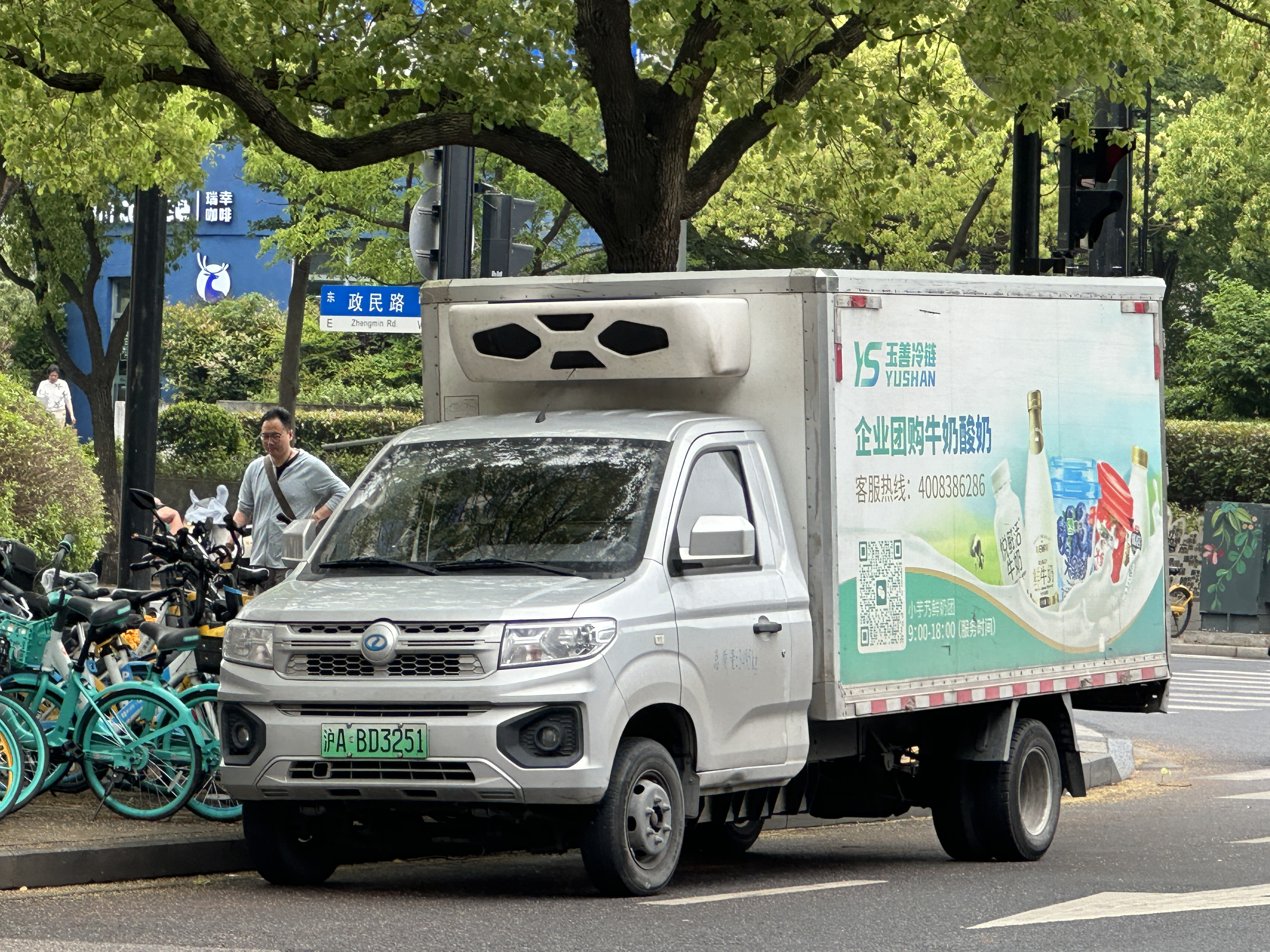
Ruichi ED71

== International markets ==
=== United Kingdom ===
The C31, C32, C35 and C37 became available in the United Kingdom in 2017. The brand was originally launched in the UK in 2012, but sales under the previous distributor ended before 2016.

=== Indonesia ===
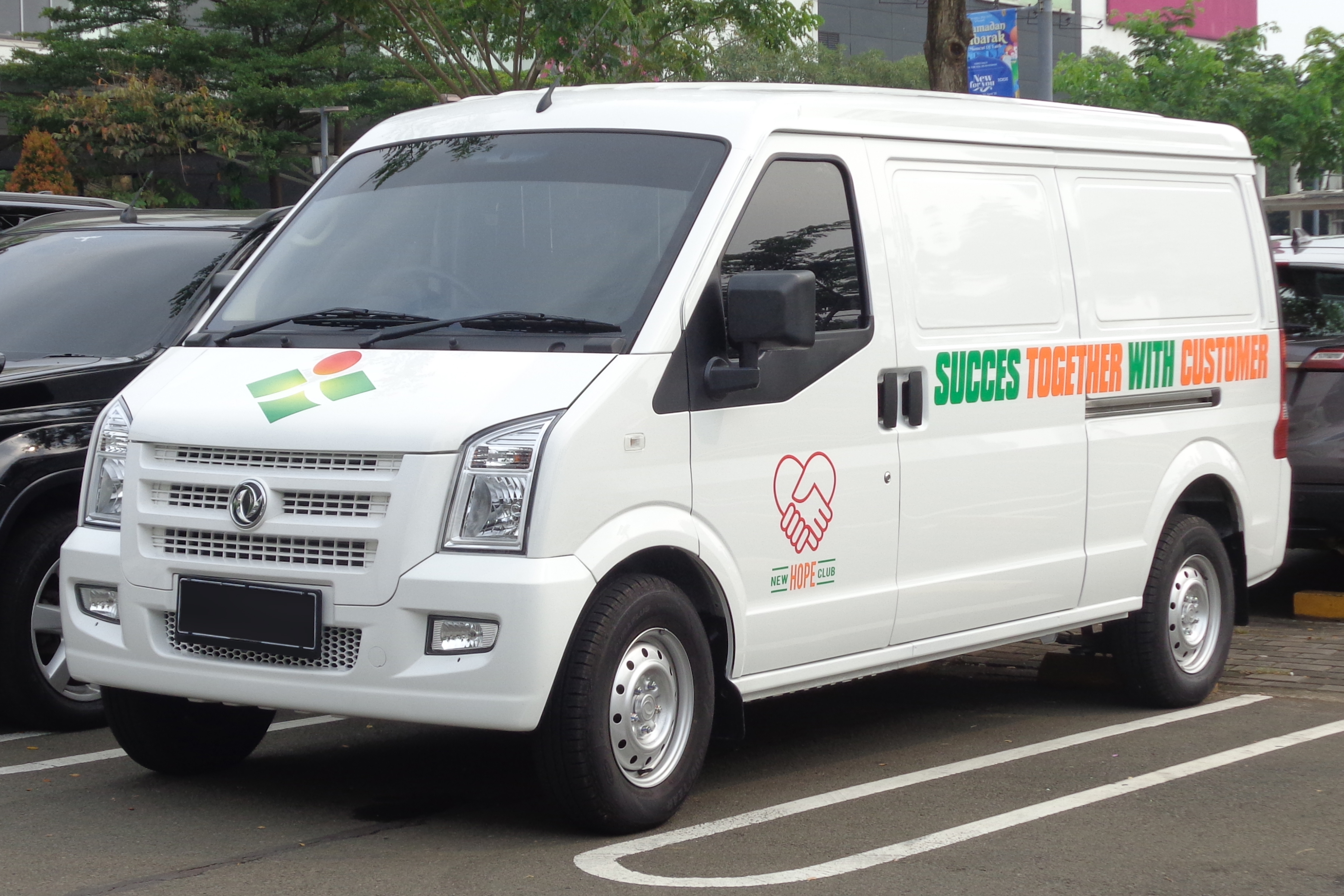
2021 DFSK Gelora 1.5 Blind Van (Indonesia)

In Indonesia, the C-Series vans were sold as the DFSK Gelora. It was unveiled at the 2020 Gaikindo Indonesia International Commercial Vehicle Expo on March 5, 2020, and launched in November 2020 for the panel van, and January 2021 for the passenger van. The panel van is based on the C35, while the passenger van is based on the C36 and C37 respectively. The passenger version is only available in a 11-seater configuration. Both models were powered by a conventional 1.5-litre petrol engine, and locally built at DFSK's Cikande plant in Banten.

An electric version of the Gelora, the Gelora E, was also unveiled at the same show as the ICE-powered Gelora, and launched at the 28th Indonesia International Motor Show on April 15, 2021. Similar to the conventional model, it is available in a passenger van (based on the EC36) and panel van (based on the EC35) configurations, both models were powered by a single electric motor. The Gelora E was initially imported from China between 2021 and 2023, and later assembled in Indonesia since February 2023.

The Gelora E was one of the operational vehicles used for the 2022 G20 Bali Summit in Bali.

=== Romania ===
The DFSK EC35 Cargovan is available in Romania from the "New Car Trading S.R.L." importer, located in Harghita County.

=== Thailand ===
The SOKON EC35 Cargovan and SOKON EC31 Pickup are available in Thailand from the Planet EV.

== Golden Dragon Longyun GLE570 ==
The Golden Dragon Longyun (龙运) GLE570 is a rebadged electric variant of the DFSK C-Series vans featuring a restyled front end sold by Golden Dragon in 2023. It is available with a selection of 35.904kW and 41.86kW batteries.

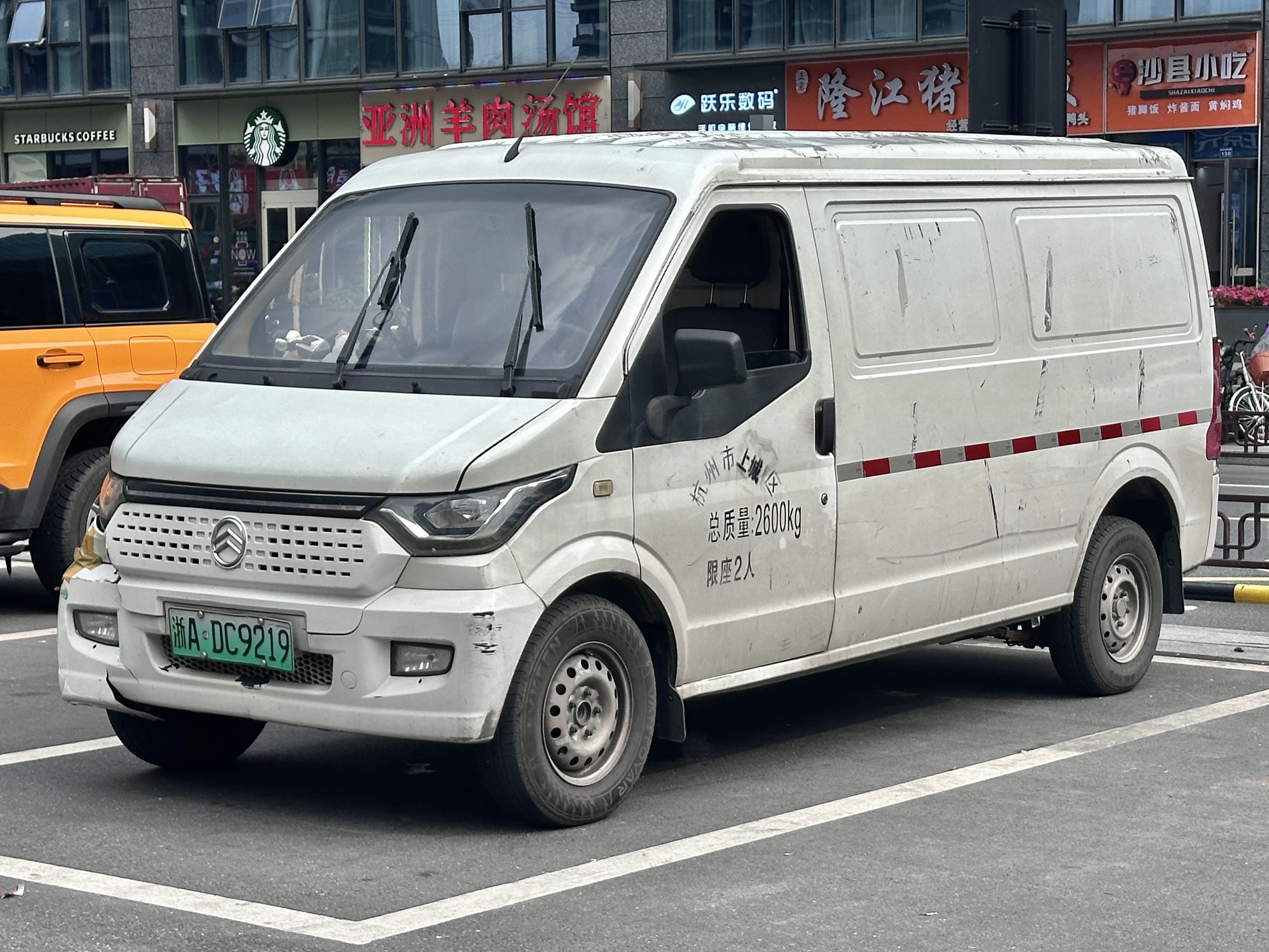
Golden Dragon GLE570

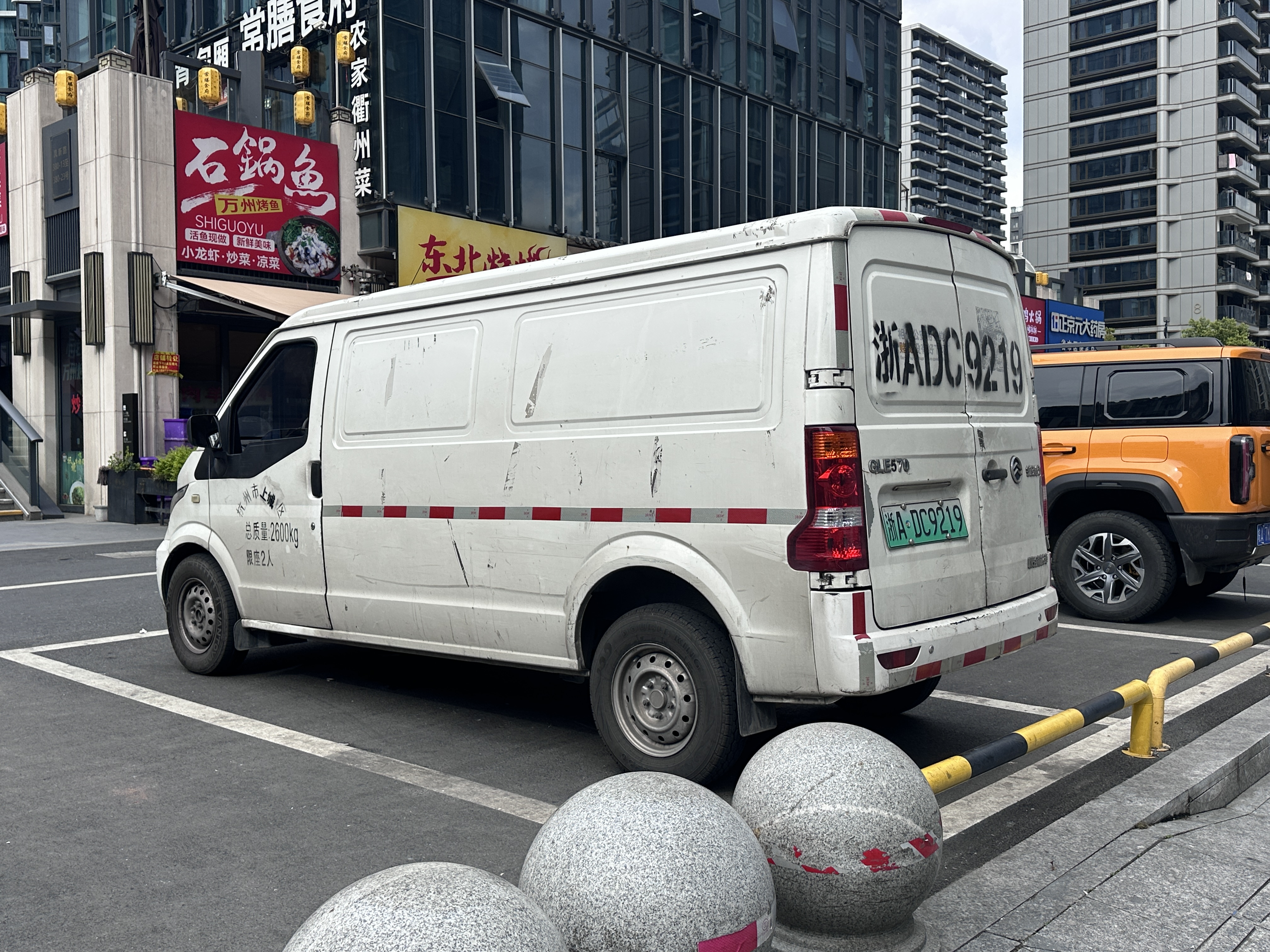
Rear
