= Caspar C 32 =

C 32
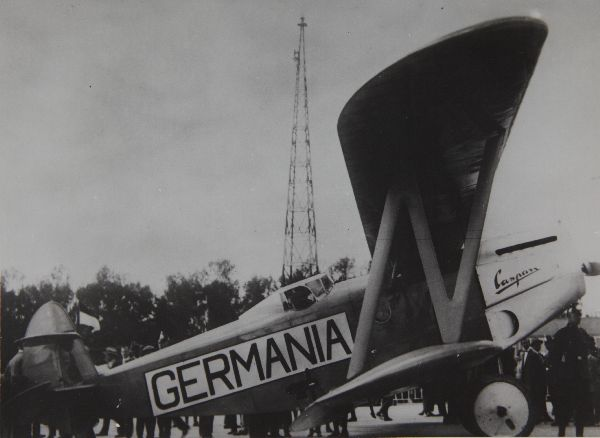
- Germania

General information
- Type: Agricultural aircraft
- Manufacturer: Caspar-Werke
- Designer: Reinhold Mewes
- Number built: 4

History
- First flight: 1928

The Caspar C 32 was an aircraft developed in Germany for aerial spraying in the late 1920s. It was a single-bay biplane with staggered, equal-span wings that accommodated the pilot and a single passenger or observer in tandem open cockpits. A small, additional horizontal stabiliser was fitted near the top of the tall single tail fin above the main horizontal stabiliser.

== Design and development ==
The first example was used by the Biologische Reichsanstalt für Land- und Forstwirtschaft in Berlin until the early 1930s, before being acquired by DVS in 1933. DVS also purchased two examples directly from Caspar.

== Operational history ==
The fourth and last C 32 built was bought by the Graf Solms-Laubach and named Germania. Otto Könnecke was to have made a transatlantic crossing with it, but ongoing bad weather led to the continuous postponing of the event. Eventually, the plan was changed to making an eastward flight to the United States, via India and Japan. Könnecke departed Cologne on 27 September 1927, but by early 1928 was forced to turn back having only reached India.

== Specifications (C 32) ==
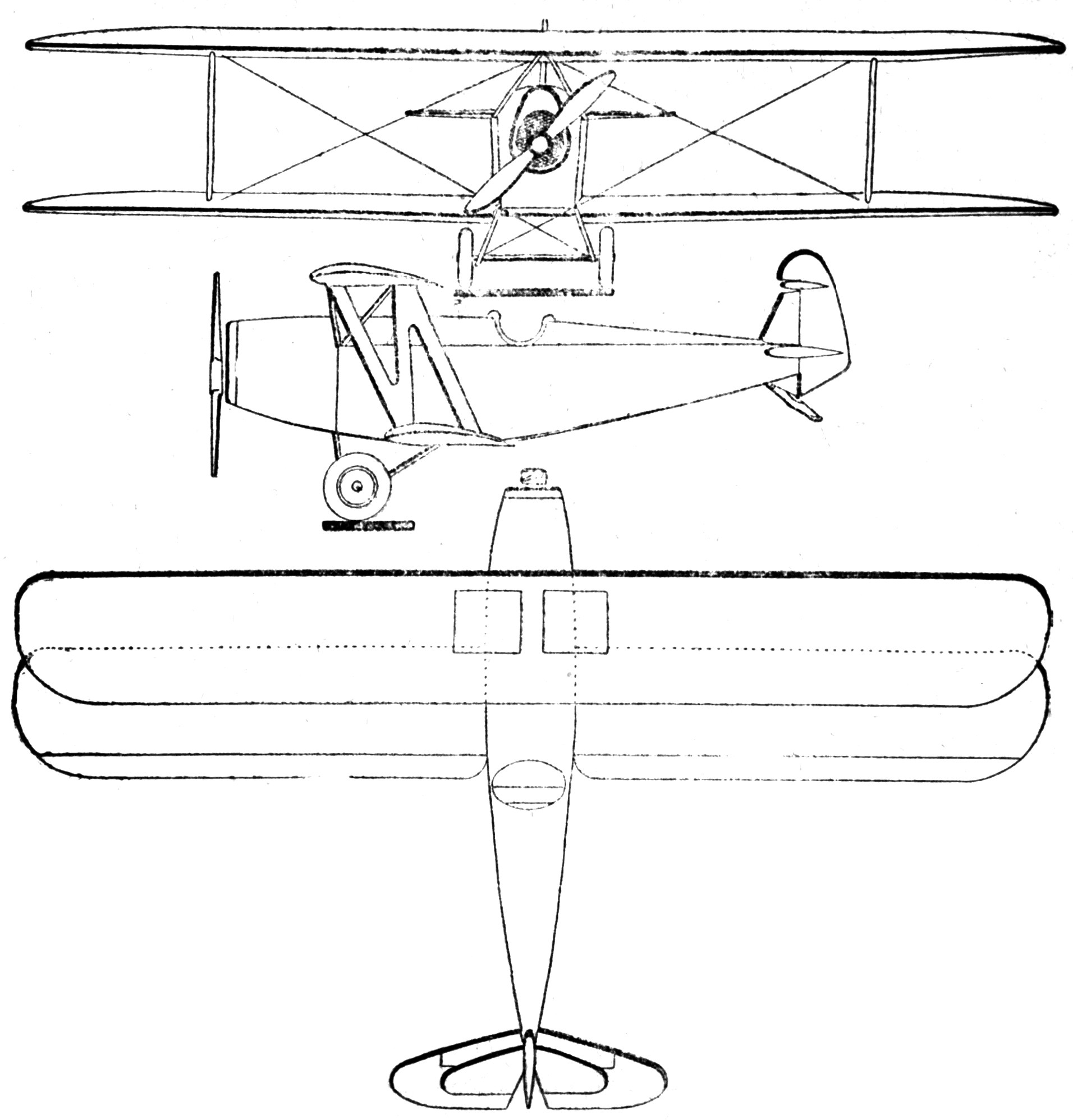
Caspar C 32 3-view drawing from Les Ailes August 19,1927

Data from Jane's all the World's Aircraft 1928

General characteristics

- Crew: 1
- Capacity: 897 kg (1,978 lb) disposable load
- Length: 9 m (29 ft 6 in)
- Wingspan: 15 m (49 ft 3 in)
- Height: 3.9 m (12 ft 10 in)
- Wing area: 53 m^{2} (570 sq ft)
- Empty weight: 1,403 kg (3,093 lb)
- Gross weight: 2,300 kg (5,071 lb)
- Powerplant: 1 × Junkers L5 6-cylinder water-cooled in-line piston engine, 230 kW (310 hp) for take-off; 210 kW (280 hp) continuous
- Propellers: 2-bladed fixed pitch propeller

Performance

- Maximum speed: 180 km/h (110 mph, 97 kn)
- Landing speed: 80 km/h (50 mph; 43 kn)
- Service ceiling: 3,700 m (12,100 ft)
- Rate of climb: 1.9 m/s (370 ft/min)
- Time to altitude: 1,000 m (3,300 ft) in 8.6 minutes
- Wing loading: 43.4 kg/m^{2} (8.9 lb/sq ft)
- Power/mass: 0.0875 kW/kg (0.0532 hp/lb)
